= Door lock =

Door lock may refer to:

== Automotive ==
- an automobile's door lock, which may include a remote
- Power door locks

== Film ==
- Door Lock (film), a 2018 South Korean film directed by Lee Kwon

== Household and commercial uses ==
- a deadbolt lock
- a door chain
- a locking door handle
- an electromagnetic lock, which holds a door shut when electricity is supplied to it
- a keycard lock, commonly used on hotel doors
- a mortise lock, a lock installed in a hollowed-out pocket within a door
- a rim lock, a lock fixed to the exterior of the door

== See also ==
- Door security
- Lock and key
