= Berlin key =

Type of door key

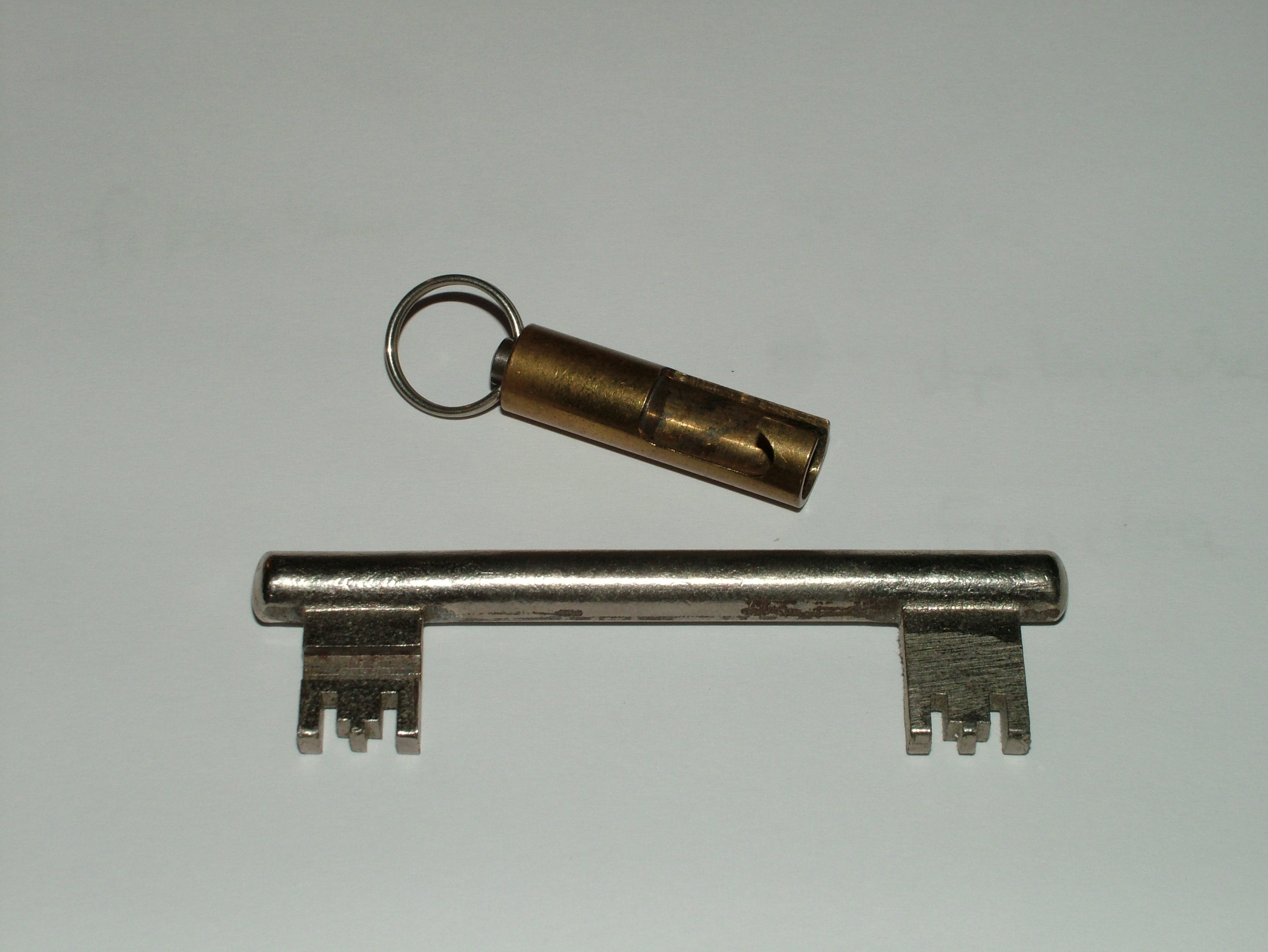
Berlin key

The Berlin key (German: Schließzwangschlüssel), also known as forced-locking key, is a key for a type of door lock. It was designed to force people to close and lock their doors, usually a main entrance door or gate leading into a common yard or tenement block. The key was a solution to the problem of access via communal doors of such blocks (Mietskaserne) as early as the 19th century.

The system was invented by the Berlin locksmith Johannes Schweiger and mass produced by Albert Kerfin & Co, starting in 1912. It has become less common with the advent of modern locking technologies, but as of 2005, it was estimated that 8000–10000 were still in use in Berlin.

== Mechanism ==
A Berlin key has two key blades, one at each end of the key, rather than the usual single blade. The lock has two modes of operation that can be selected using a master key. This is usually done by the building caretaker. At night, the door can be unlocked, and only releases the key after it has been locked again. During the day, the door cannot be locked using the normal key.

The night mode works as follows:

1. Unlock the door from the outside
2. Push the key through the lock, so that the key protrudes from the inside of the door
3. Open the door and enter
4. Close the door and lock the door with the key
5. Take the key from the lock

== Representations ==
The key is subject of the essay The Berlin Key by science and technology studies professor Bruno Latour. According to Latour, this technical object is a decisive agent that can mediate the relationship between the tenants, users, and visitors of a building. He also proposed that the key performs a "program of action" or a "script", which is "Please bolt the door behind you during the night and never during the day". This indicates two meanings for the term hardware in terms of the key as a mechanism — a door lock and information processor.

Another interpretation noted that the key reveals two social dichotomies as it draws the line between guarded and unguarded resources as well as between inhabitants and strangers. The Berlin key was also used to reference the Berlin Wall when it opened in 1989.
