= Magnetic keyed lock =

Type of mechanical lock

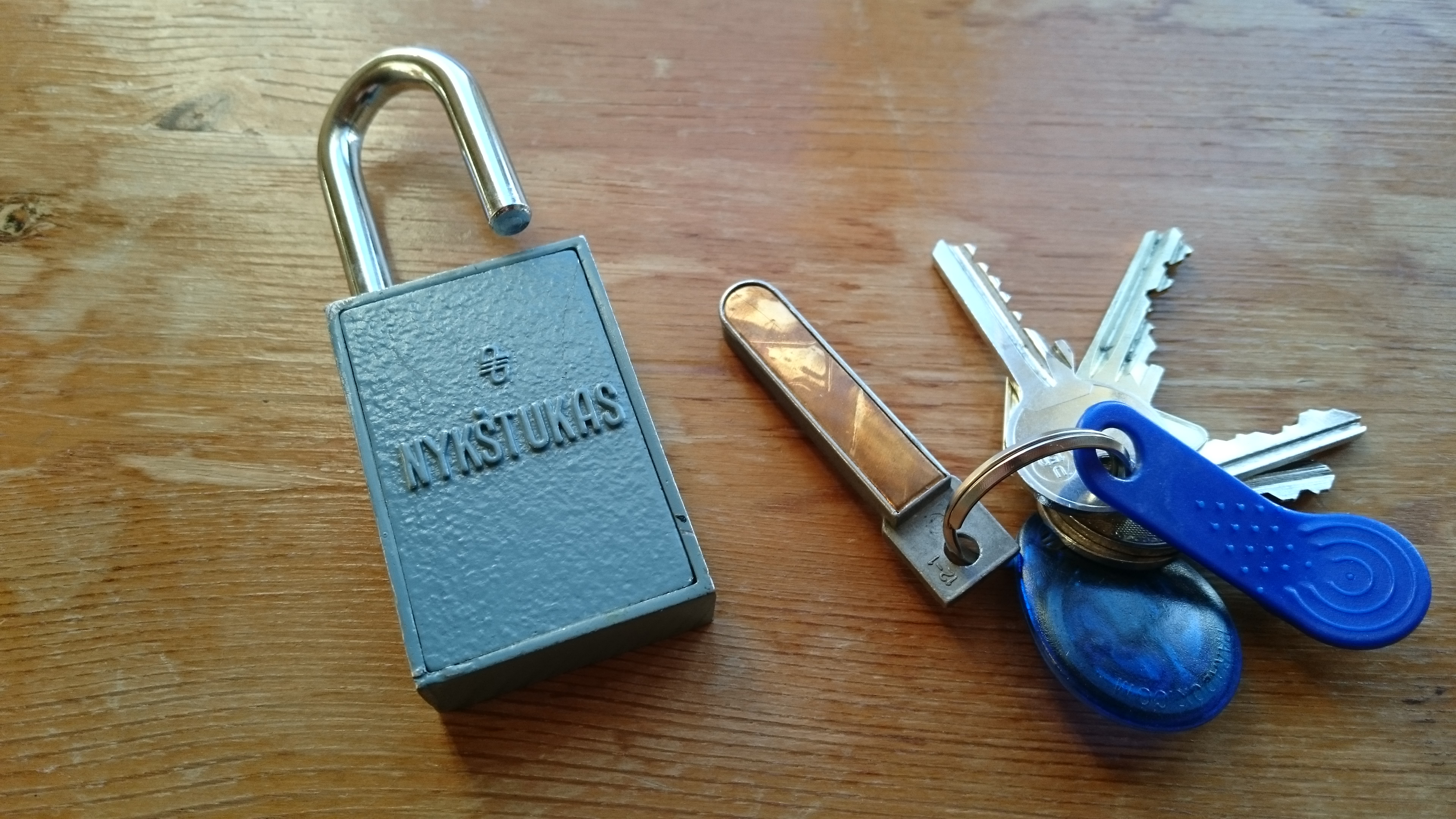
A magnetic keyed padlock

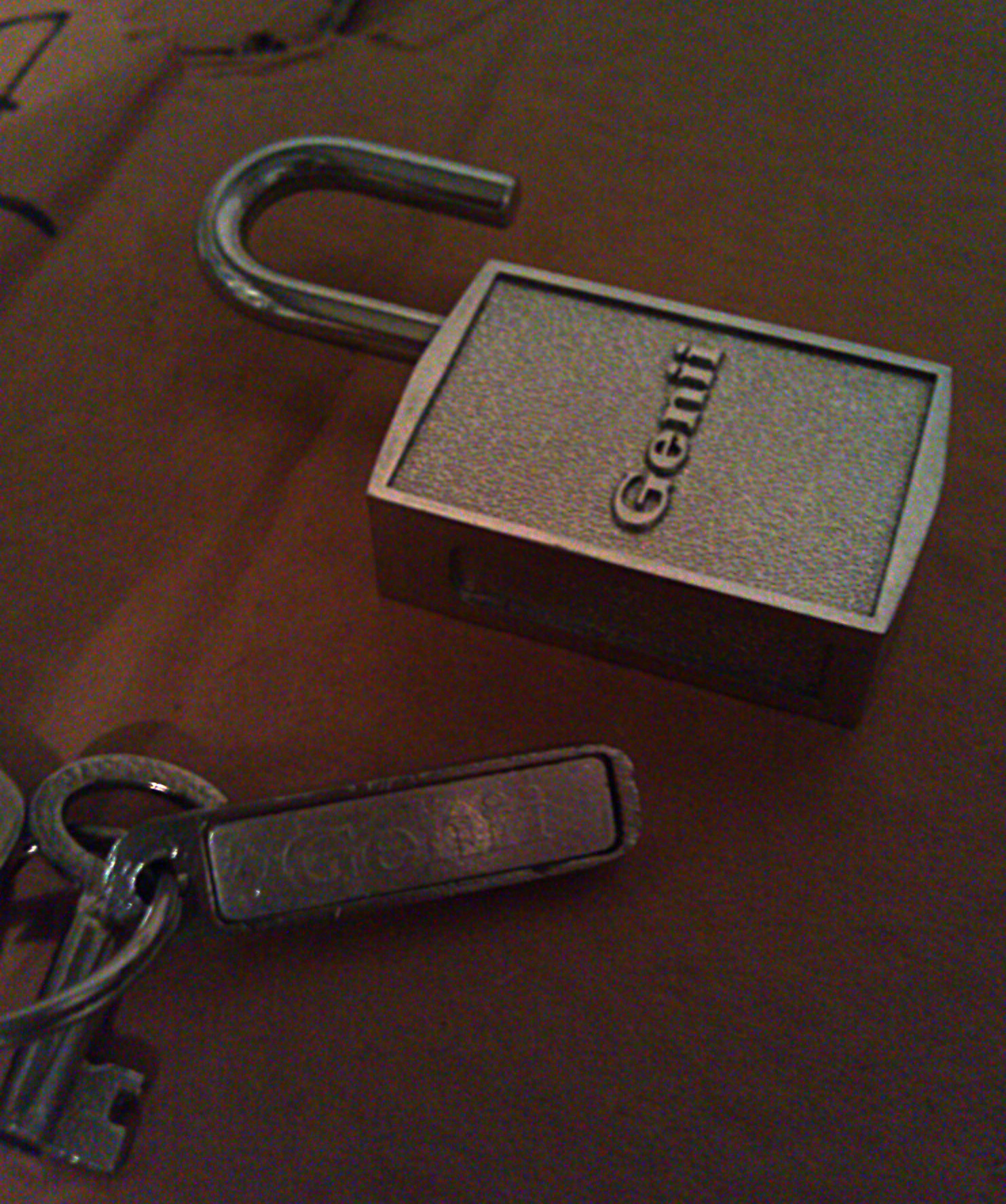
A magnetic keyed padlock

A magnetic keyed lock or magnetic-coded lock is a locking mechanism whereby the key utilizes magnets as part of the locking and unlocking mechanism. Magnetic-coded locks encompass knob locks, cylinder locks, lever locks, and deadbolt locks as well as applications in other security devices.

== Design ==
A magnetic key uses from one to many small magnets oriented so that the North / South Poles would equate to a combination to push or pull the lock's internal tumblers thus releasing the lock. This is a totally passive system requiring no electricity or electronics to activate or deactivate the mechanism. Using several magnets at differing polarity / orientations and different strengths can allow thousands of different combinations per key.

Magnetic-coded technology utilizes multiple pairs of magnetic pins with opposing poles that are embedded inside keys and plugs. When a correctly matched key is inserted into the lock, not only are all the mechanical pins pushed into the correct positions, the magnetic pins are also driven to the appropriate level by the magnetic force inside the key.

The magnetic pins are made with permanent magnets which means the magnets stay magnetized. The intensity of the magnet will not decay over time or be affected by other magnetic fields.

== Security ==
In order to open a magnetic-coded lock, three criteria must be met: correct teething of the key, magnetic pin locations and poles of the magnetic pins. If any of these three criteria are not satisfied, the lock stays inoperable and cannot be turned.

Traditional lock picking is impossible due to the tumblers being magnetically operated instead of via a physical up and down action. Magnetic keys also cannot be reproduced by locksmiths by sight or other "human sensed" information.

== Equation ==
$$N = C \cdot 4^m$$

where

$N$ is the number of magnetic-coded lock key combinations,
$C$ is the number of conventional pin-tumbler lock combinations,
$m$ is the number of pairs of embedded magnets (multiple pairs can be embedded).

== Advantages ==
- Anti-picking: The embedded magnetic pins are not exposed to the key way, therefore, no lifting force can be applied to move the magnetic pins. Most standard forms of lock picking are therefore preventable. This does not mean the lock cannot be picked by something as simple as quickly moving a strong magnet around it while applying force to the mechanism.
- Anti-bumping: Lock bumping transmits kinetic energy from the key to the drive pins, to split the bottom and top pins. The embedded magnetic technology has no physical contact points between key and magnetic pins, therefore no kinetic energy is transmitted.
- Key control (advantages): Due to the magnetic cylinder elements embedded in the keys, there is a high degree of key control. Unlawful key duplications are minimized by limited access to key blanks (locksmiths) and unique magnetic coding in the key that cannot easily be determined by inspecting the target lock.
- Cost effectiveness: Because the manufacturing process is based on the pin and tumbler platform, the cost of manufacturing is significantly reduced when compared to high security locks with comparable security features. These high security locks often utilize new locking mechanisms which increase the cost of manufacturing.

== Disadvantages ==
- Manufacturing complexity: A special tool set and procedures have to be developed to accomplish the task of embedding the magnets inside both the keys and the locks.
- Key control (disadvantages): Having a limited supply of blanks can make legitimate duplication of keys — for example, after one is lost — more difficult and more expensive.

== History ==
The magnetic-coded lock was invented by an engineer in Nanchang, China. There have been several Chinese patents taken out on this technology.

== See also ==
- Physical security
