= Skeleton key =

Key modified to unlock a variety of locks

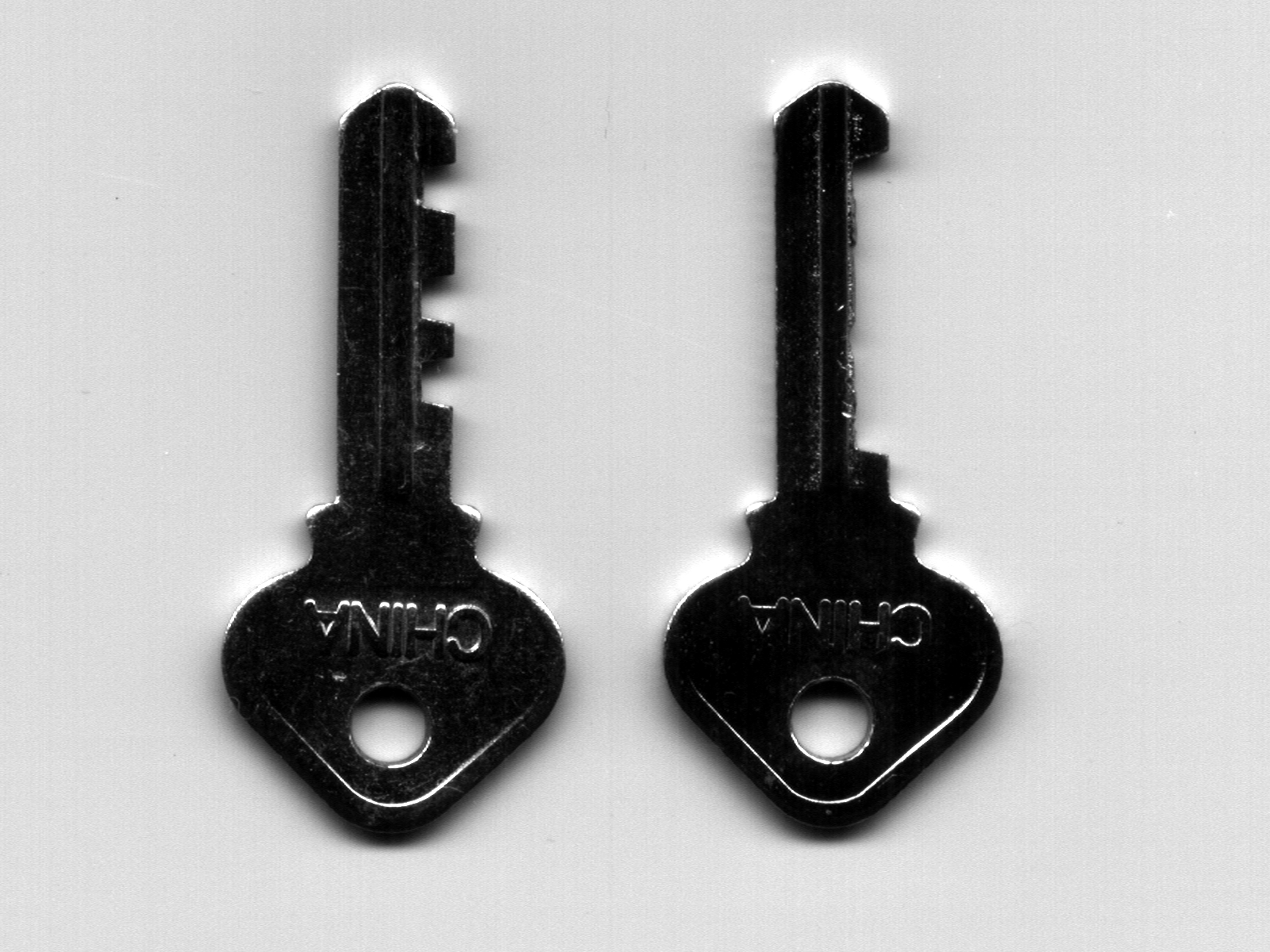
A padlock skeleton key with all of the teeth filed down (right) and a normal key (left) for the same lock. The normal key on the left will open only the lock to which it goes, but the skeleton key on the right will open any lock with this particular keyhole.

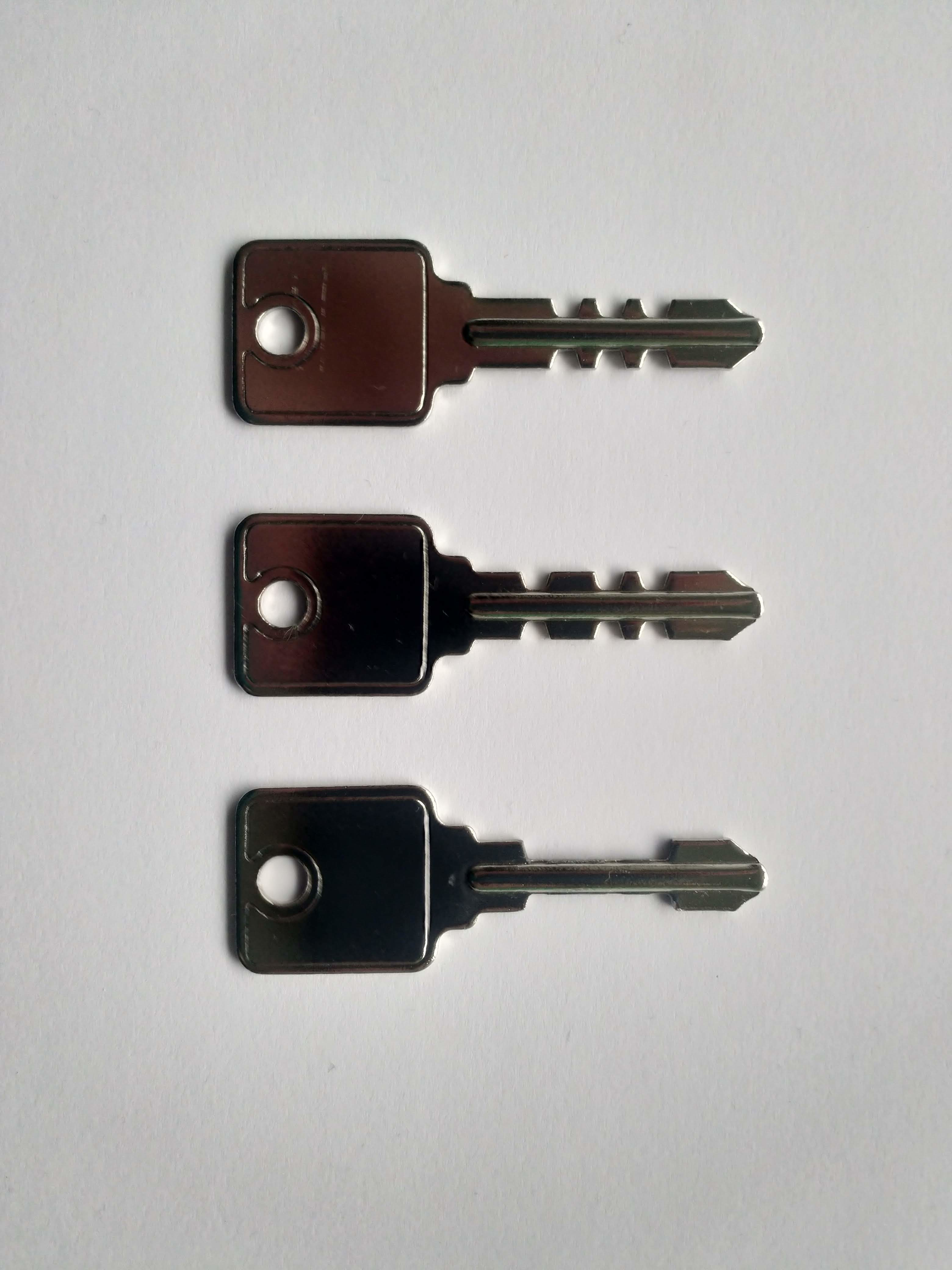
Two warded lock keys and a homemade skeleton key

A skeleton key (also known as a passkey) is a type of master key in which the serrated edge has been removed in such a way that it can open numerous locks, most commonly the warded lock. The term derives from the fact that the key has been reduced to its essential parts.

== Master keys ==
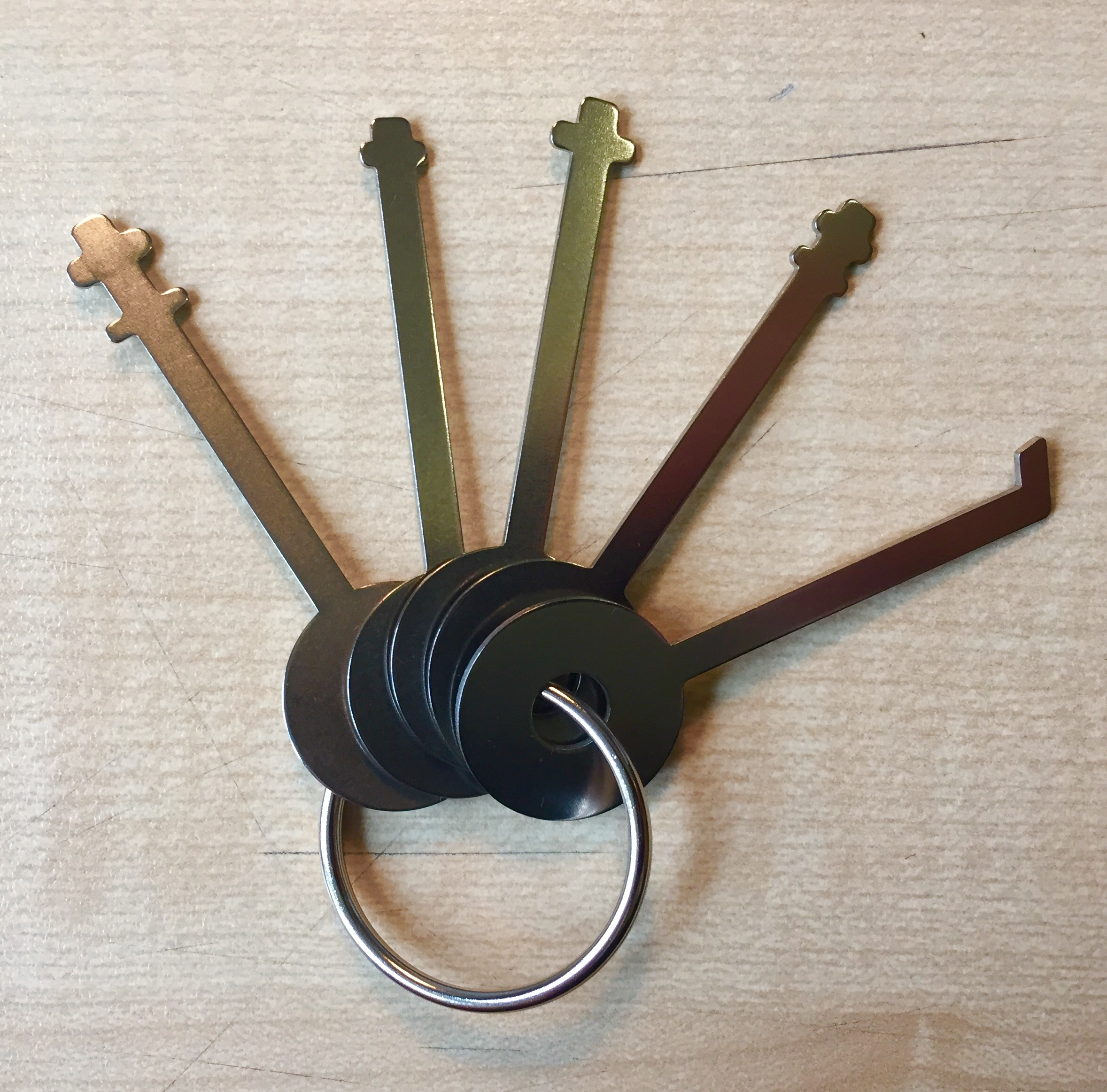
A common set of skeleton keys used to open most types of warded padlocks

A skeleton key is a key that has been filed or cut to create one that can be used to unlock a variety of warded locks each with a different configuration of wards. This can usually be done by removing most of the center of the key, allowing it to pass by the wards without interference, operating the lock. To counteract the illicit creation of such keys, locksmiths can put wards not just in the center but on the outside as well, making the creation of a skeleton key more difficult.

Lever lock skeleton keys are used in a lock with usually three or five levers and a set of wards that come into contact with the bit of the key only on the sides—the top is for pushing the levers to their correct heights while the warded section of the key just has to pass uninterrupted to allow the key to rotate fully. A master key system of lever locks has the same lever heights in all locks. Each door will have different wards and can only be opened by the correctly warded key or the master key. A skeleton key has the warded section of the key removed so that it opens all the doors of a system.

Some applications, such as a building with multiple entrance doors, have numerous locks that are keyed alike; one key will open every door. A keyed-alike system is different from a master key system as none of the locks have a key that can open only that lock.

Skeleton keys have often been associated with attempts to defeat locks for illicit purposes, to release handcuffs for example, and standard keys have been filed down for that purpose. Legitimate skeleton or master keys are used in many modern contexts where lock operation is required and the original key has been lost or is not available. In hotels without electronic locks, skeleton keys are used by housekeeping services to enter the rooms.

== See also ==
- Master keying
- Lock picking
- Lock bumping, a technique for opening pin tumbler locks.
