= Mortise lock =

Type of lock

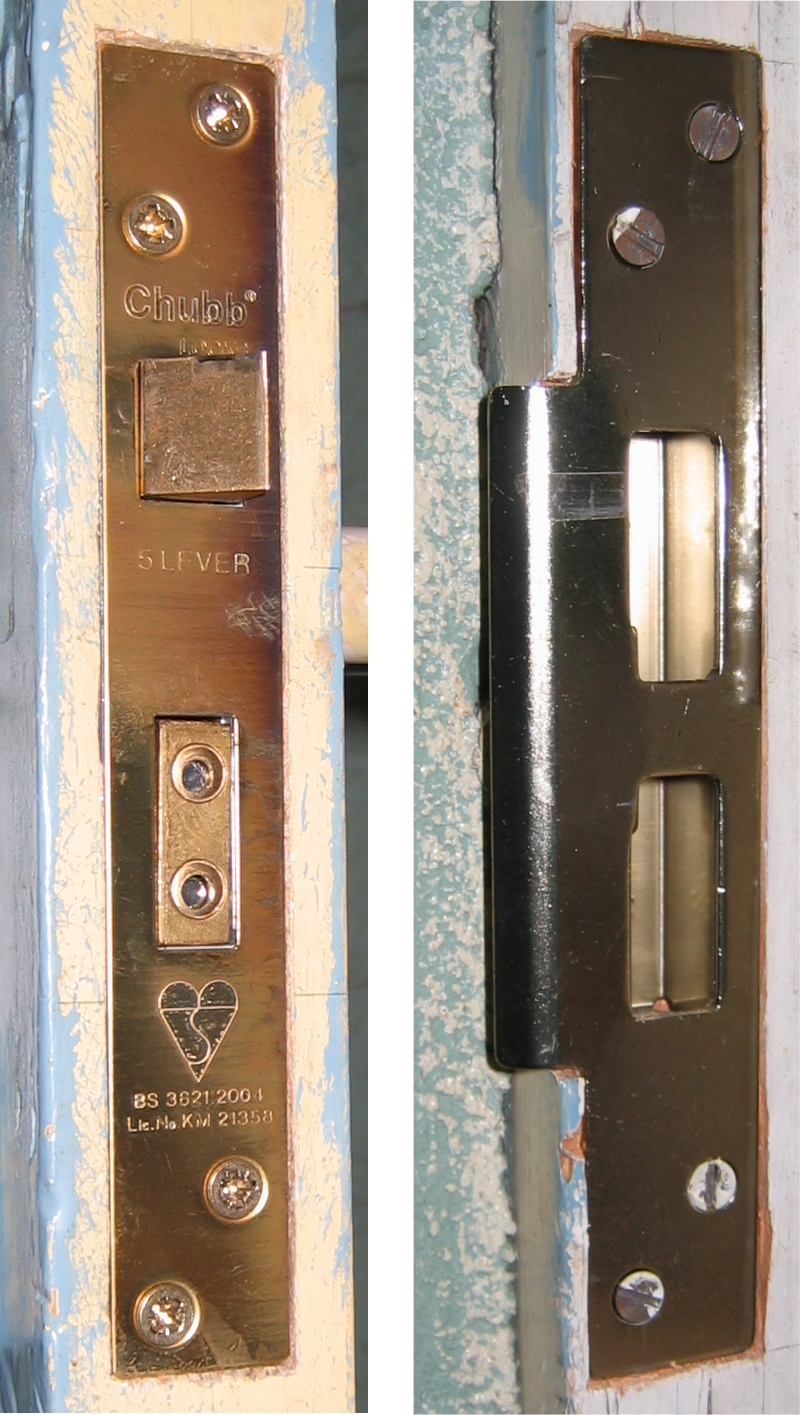
The two main parts of a mortise lock. Left: the lock body, installed in the thickness of a door. This example has two bolts: a sprung latch at the top, and a locking bolt at the bottom. Right: the box keep or strike plate, installed in the doorjamb.

A mortise lock (also spelled mortice lock in British English) is a lock that requires a pocket—the mortise—to be cut into the edge of the door or piece of furniture into which the lock is to be fitted. Mortise lock describes only a method of fitting the lock, and says nothing about the quality or key mechanism.

In some parts of the world, mortise locks are found on older buildings constructed before the advent of bored cylindrical locks, but they have recently become more common in commercial and upmarket residential construction in the United States. The design is widely used in properties of all ages across Europe.

== History ==
Mortise locks have been used as part of door hardware systems in the US since the second quarter of the eighteenth century. In these early forms, the mortise lock mechanism was combined with a pull to open the unlocked door. Eventually, pulls were replaced by knobs.

Until the mid-nineteenth century, mortise locks were only used in the most formal rooms in the most expensive houses. Other rooms used box locks or rim locks; in contrast with embedded mortise locks, the latch itself is in a self-contained unit that is attached to the surface of the door. Rim locks have been used in the United States since the early eighteenth century.

An early example of the use of mortise locks in conjunction with rim locks within one house exists at Thomas Jefferson's Monticello. In 1805, Jefferson wrote to his joiner listing the locks he required for his home. While closets received rim locks, Jefferson ordered 26 mortise locks for use in the principal rooms.

Depictions of available mortise lock hardware, including not only lock mechanisms themselves but also escutcheon plates and door pulls, were widely available in the early nineteenth century in trade catalogues. However, the locks were still expensive and difficult to obtain at this time. Jefferson ordered his locks from Paris. Similarly, mortise locks were used in primary rooms in 1819 at Decatur House in Washington, DC while rim locks were used in closets and other secondary spaces.

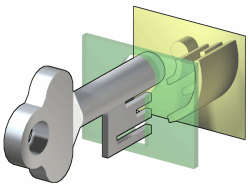
Warded lock mechanisms are now rarely used for mortise locks.

The mortise locks used at Monticello were warded locks. The term "warded lock" refers to the lock mechanism, while the term "mortise lock" refers to the lock method of fixing. Warded locks contain a series of static obstructions, or wards, within the lock box; only a key with cutouts to match the obstructions will be able to turn freely in the lock and open the latch.

Warded locks were used in Europe from the Roman period onwards. Two English locksmiths, Robert Barron and Jeremiah Chubb, played a major role in creating modern lever tumbler locks. Chubb's lock was patented in 1818. Again, the term refers to the lock mechanism, so a lock can be both a mortise lock and a lever tumbler lock. In the modern lever tumbler lock, the key moves a series of levers that allow the bolt to move in the door.

Pin tumbler lock cylinder, commonly used for mortise locks in the US

The next major innovation to mortise lock mechanisms came in 1865. Linus Yale, Jr.'s pin tumbler mortise cylinder lock used a cam on the end of the key cylinder to operate the bolt or latch. This innovation allowed keys to be shorter as they no longer had to reach all the way through a door. Pin tumbler locks are still the most common kind of mortise door lock used today.

== Mechanism ==
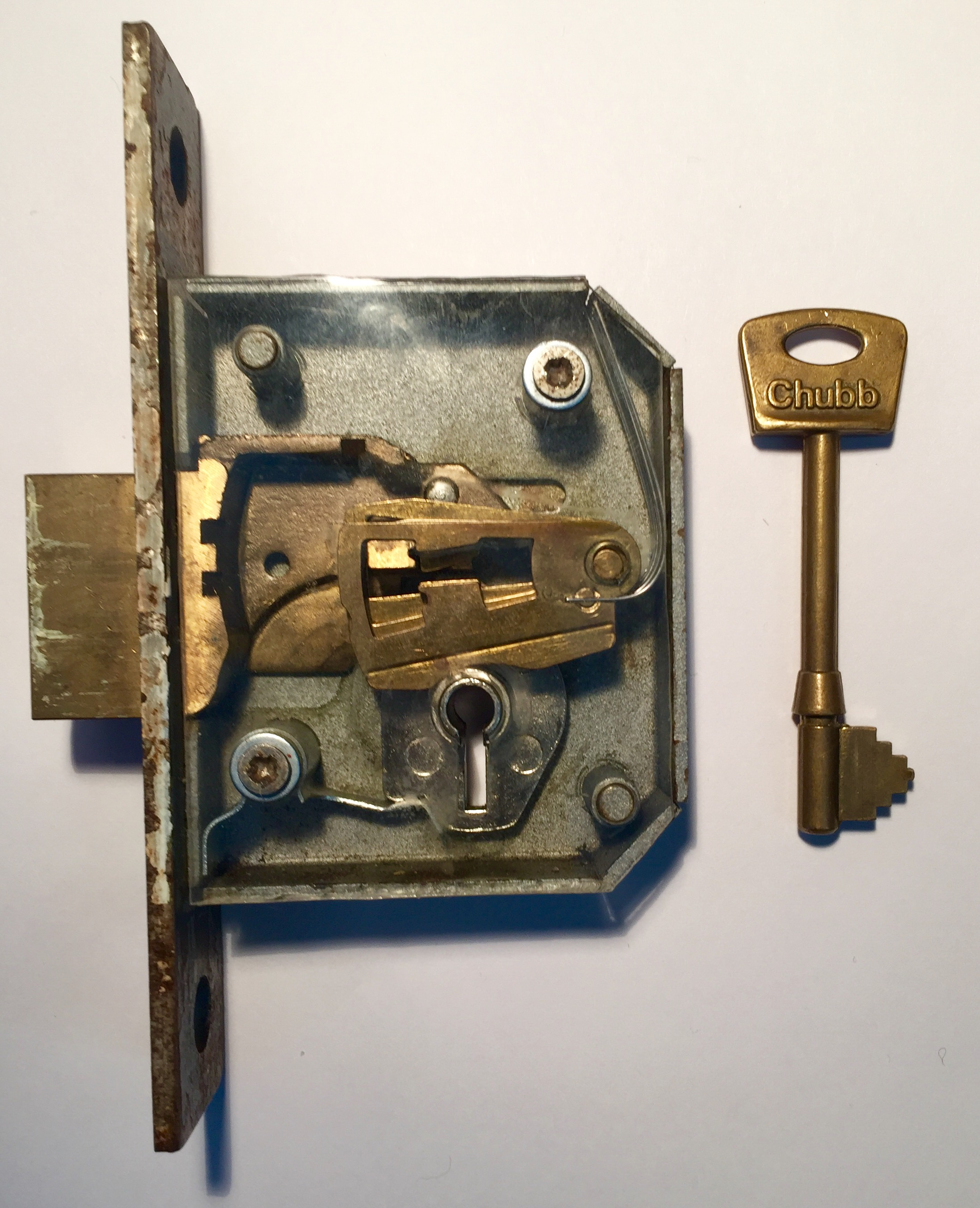
A lever lock

Mortise locks may include a non-locking latch operated by a door handle. An upright two-bolt lock is termed a sash lock. The upright case was invented for the new design of glazed or part-glazed door—the 'sash door'. Sash doors have upright stiles too narrow for the earlier horizontal lock case, in which the case is wider than it is tall. Most modern mortise door locks are now upright rather than horizontal. Upright latches should have lever handles, horizontal latches now usually have knob handles.

A lock without a latch is termed a dead lock. Dead locks are commonly used as a secure backup to a sprung non-deadlocking latch, now often a pin tumbler rim latch. (Note: The type commonly called a "Yale" lock.) Mortise latches, which might or might not be deadlocking, have also been made, but are now uncommon.

Mortise locks have historically, and still commonly do, use lever locks as a mechanism. Some older mortise locks have used warded lock mechanisms. This has led to popular confusion, as the term "mortise lock" was usually used in reference to lever keys in traditional European terminology. In recent years the Euro cylinder lock has become common, using a pin tumbler lock in a mortise housing.

The parts included in the typical US mortise lock installation are the lock body (the part installed inside the mortise cut-out in the door); the lock trim (which may be selected from any number of designs of doorknobs, levers, handle sets and pulls); a strike plate (or box keep), which lines and reinforces the cavity in the door jamb or frame into which the bolt fits; and the keyed cylinder which operates the locking/unlocking function of the lock body.

== Selection and installation ==
The installation of a mortise lock can be undertaken by an average homeowner with a working knowledge of basic woodworking tools and methods. Many installation specialists such as carpenters use a dedicated mortising jig which makes precise cutting of the pocket a simple operation, but the subsequent installation of the external trim can still prove problematic if the installer is inexperienced.

Although the installation of a mortise lock actually weakens the structure of the typical timber door, the embedded lock is typically stronger and more versatile than the newer bored cylindrical lock (or tubular lock) format, both in external trim, and functionality. Reinforcing plates can be bolted to the door surface over the mortise to strengthen the door. Whereas the newer mechanism lacks the physical volume and mechanical stability required for ornate and solid-cast knobs and levers, the mortise lock can accommodate a heavier return spring and a more substantial internal mechanism. Mortise locks are available in a wide range of functional security configurations, and are widely installed in industrial, commercial, and institutional environments, and in Europe, domestic doors.

Furthermore, a typical US mortise lock typically accepts a wide range of other standardized manufacturers' cylinders and accessories, allowing architectural and functional conformity with other lock hardware already on site.

Manufacturers of mortise locks in the United States include Accurate, Arrow, Baldwin, Best, Corbin Russwin, Emtek Products, Inc, Falcon, Penn, Schlage, Sargent, and Yale. Distributors such as Nostalgic Warehouse carry a wide range of decorative trim and accessories to dress up the appearance of a lock installation. Also, many European manufacturers whose products had previously been restricted to "designer" installations have recently gained wider acceptance and use.

Some cabinet locks have also been fitted as mortise locks, though they are uncommon.
