= Night latch =

Type of keyed door lock

A night latch (or night-latch or nightlatch) is a lock that is fitted on the surface of a door; it is operated from the exterior side of the door by a key and from the interior (i.e. "secure") side of the door by a knob.

== Overview ==
Night latches are usually rim locks and are available as deadlocking (automatically locks once shut) and non-deadlocking versions.

Historically, such locks were intended for use at night-time, hence the name. The keyless egress that they offer is a valuable fire safety measure, but may be a security risk if breaking a glass panel (usually in the door) or a nearby small window allows an intruder to reach the knob inside and open the door from the outside.
