= The Berlin Key =

1993 essay by sociologist Bruno Latour

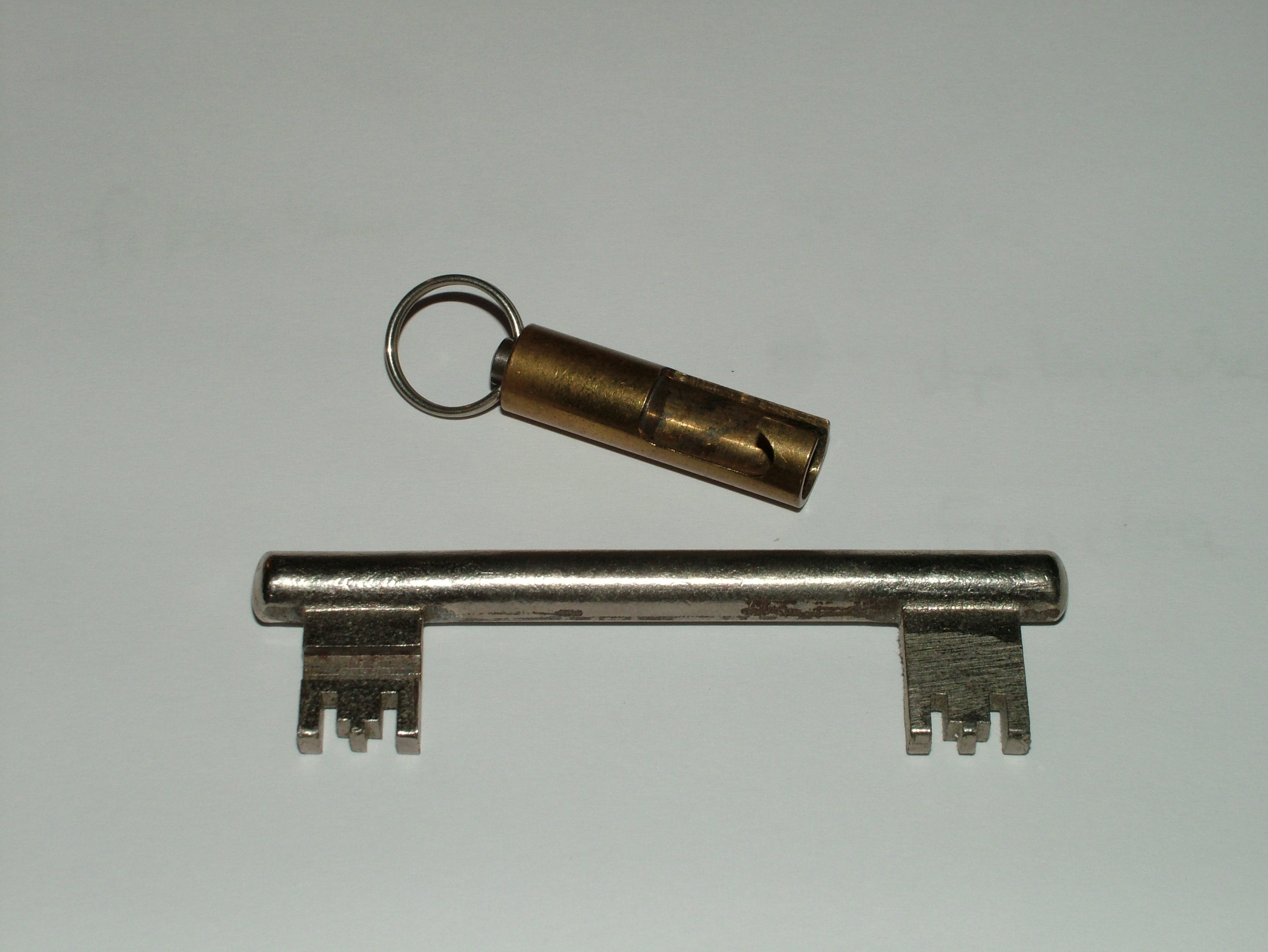
The Berlin key

"The Berlin key or how to do words with things" is an essay by sociologist Bruno Latour that originally appeared as La clef de Berlin et autres leçons d'un amateur de sciences, La Découverte, in 1993. It was later published as the first chapter in P.M. Graves-Brown's Matter, Materiality and Modern Culture.

In the 15-page chapter, written informally in third-person narrative, Latour describes a common object used in Berlin, a "Berlin Key" which is constructed so that after unlocking one's apartment door to leave from inside one can only retrieve the key from outside in a manner which locks the door behind oneself; upon entering, after one unlocks the door with the key, one must retrieve it from the inside, again locking the door behind oneself; this prevents leaving the door open but unlocked. The essay shows how many layers of significance a key can connote. In the P.M. Graves-Brown version, Lydia Davis translated the piece into English. Additional editing was completed and illustrations redrawn by Graves-Brown. The title could have been chosen as a witty word-play off of J.L. Austin's How to Do Things With Words.

Latour argues that while an object's purposefully designed material nature may recommend or permit a highly controlled set of functional purposes, it may also offer a broad range of valuable possibilities.

Latour uses the Berlin key to show that there are social constraints which force people to do whatever it is that the object makes them do; thus, the object (the Berlin key) is a sign, of sorts, telling the inhabitants to "lock their doors at night, but never during the day."

Latour discusses the relationship between the social realm and the technological realm. He asserts that the Sociologist and the Technologist are "enemy brothers", thinking they will come to an end—the sociologist with the social and the technologist with objects.
