= Police lock =

High-security door lock

A police lock is a type of high-security door lock. There are two distinct kinds of police lock.

== Overview ==
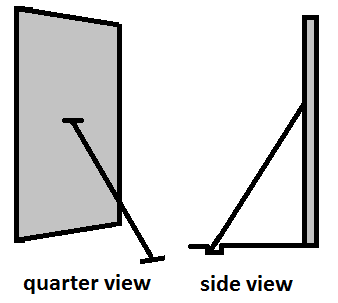
Floor-mounted police lock schematic

The first is floor-mounted. It consists of a steel bar running on at a roughly 45° angle from the center of the door to the floor, on the inside of the area to be secured. At each end of the bar are slots or fixtures (one in the door, one in the floor) into which the steel bar is secured.

This was designed by Emiel Fox (born 1869 or 1870, died 1941). Patents relating to early versions of the lock go back to at least 1907. Fox set up the Fox Police Lock Company in New York City to manufacture the locks under the brand name Police Lock; other companies have made similar locks under the same designation, so the term has become genericized to a degree. The name comes from the police procedure for securing a damaged door, which uses a similarly angled piece of sturdy wood nailed in place.

This type of police lock provides considerable security since it is even harder to break with physical force than a deadbolt – to defeat this kind of lock, the door must be at least partially destroyed or removed from its frame.

Crossbar police lock schematic

Another type of lock also called a police lock and also formerly made by the Fox Police Lock Company is the crossbar police lock. It features two steel bars across the width of the door and beyond, held by two brackets set in the doorframe. When the door is unlocked, the bars are moved inwards to the point of being withdrawn from the brackets.

Police locks are particularly associated with New York City in the 20th century, and are sometimes seen in movies set in that place and time. Floor-mounted types were designed for use with wooden doors and have been superseded with the advent of metal doors and doorframes. A copy of the original crossbar type of police lock is still made and imported from China.
