= Rim lock =

Type of lock

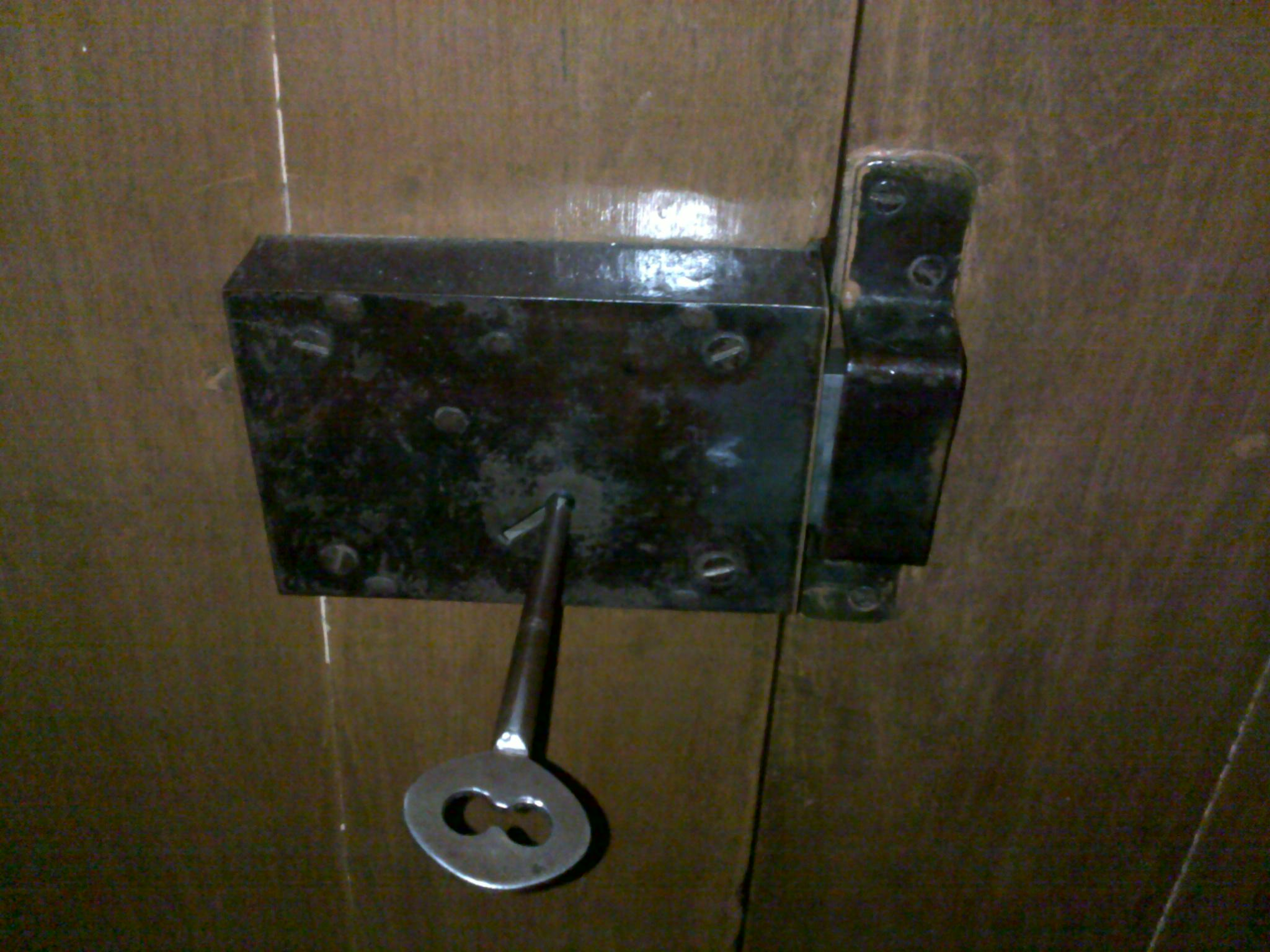
An antique rim lock installed on a door

A rim lock is a locking device that attaches to the surface of a door.

== In Europe ==
It is the oldest type of lock used in the United Kingdom and Ireland. It is of a basic design using (usually) a single lever and a sliding bolt. Wards can be used for additional security. They are not used where high security is required. Most older locks were large, some as big as 40 by 25 centimetres (15.7 by 9.8 in).

Most rimlocks used today on exterior doors in the British Isles are night latches.

== In America ==
In the United States, rim locks and rim latches are often used on wooden screen doors. A rim lock may also be seen on an antique pantry, pie safe, and other cabinets. Some rim lock and latch sets have a shallower backset than does a modern bored cylindrical lock or mortise lock, allowing their use on doors with narrow rails.

== See also ==
- Banbury lock
