= Lever tumbler lock =

Type of lock

Animation of a lever tumbler lock mechanism

A lever tumbler lock is a type of lock whose mechanism uses a set of levers to prevent the bolt from moving in the lock. It does not mean a locking lever handle incorporating a cylinder locking device.

In the simplest form of lever lock, lifting the tumbler above a certain height will allow the bolt to slide past.

Lever locks developed throughout the nineteenth century, but those used in some parts of the world were of modest security, with large keys. When Yale's pin tumbler lock was developed in the late nineteenth century, that became a more popular lock. It has a small key, many differs, and an easily interchangeable cylinder locking device, and in much of the developed world has become the most popular key mechanism for doors and padlocks.

In some parts of Europe, and elsewhere, secure lever locks continue in use for doors, and safes.

== History ==
In 1778 Robert Barron of Britain invented [British patent GB1200] the principle of all modern mechanical security locks: the double-acting movable detainer. As examples, his patent described two realisations (of several possible) of what would now be called a lever lock. These required the lever to be lifted to a certain height by having a slot cut in the lever, so lifting the lever too far was as bad as not lifting the lever far enough. This type of lock is still used today, on doors in Europe, Africa, South America and some other parts of the world.

The word 'tumbler' originally meant 'something which turns; it later also gained the connotation of 'falling', and was the term used for the dead-locking member invented by the Romans for use with a turning key in a warded lock. It was still the term used by Barron. However, by the mid-nineteenth century, 'lever tumbler' had commonly been shortened to 'lever'. The British Standard BS3621 originally entitled Thief resistant locks for hinged doors and now Lock assemblies operated by key from both the inside and outside of the door uses the term 'movable detainer' for any type of movable blocking member in a lock.

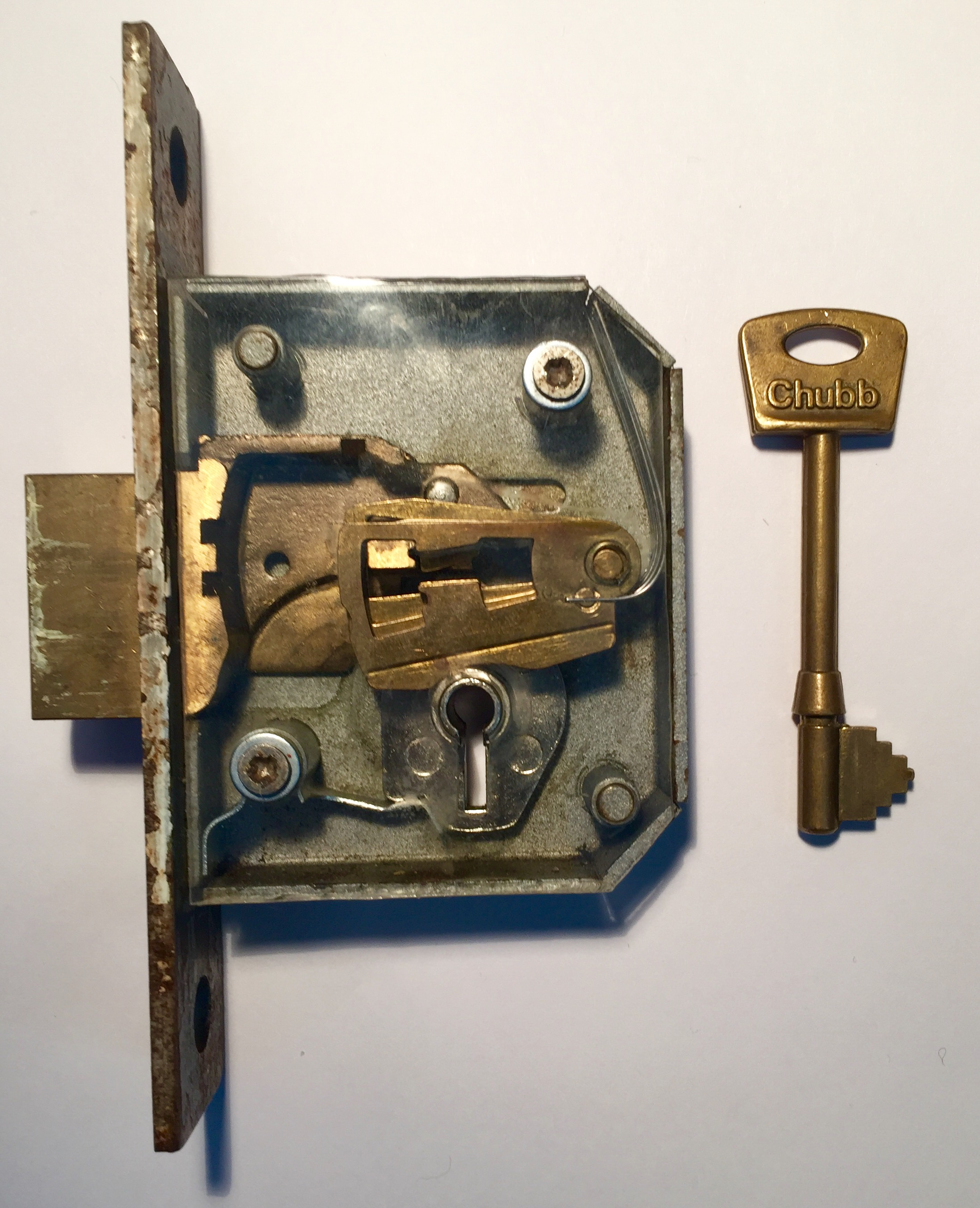
A five-lever lock which is designed to be mortised into a door. The cover plate (or cap) has been removed to see the inner workings.

== Design ==
The lock is made up of a plurality of flat levers (usually made of non-ferrous metal and impelled to the rest position by a spring). Any number of levers may be used, though some two-sided designs require an odd number. A minimum number of levers may be specified to provide an anticipated level of security for door locks.

Each lever needs to be moved (typically, lifted) to a specific position (height) by the key in order for the locking bolt to move. Typically, the belly of the lever is cut away to various depths to provide different combinations, or the gate is cut in a different height in the fence, to provide differs. A common form of lever has two pockets separated by a bar or fence, having a gap or gate, through which the bolt stump moves during unlocking or locking. Some levers eliminate the boundary of the outer pocket, becoming end-gated levers.

Lever locks generally use a bitted key. Some locks used on safes use a double-bitted key (a key with cuts on both sides, increasing security), as do some door locks of a type often used in Southern and Eastern Europe and elsewhere.

Levers are generally arranged to pivot, but in some realisations the levers slide. Notably in France, there are locks related to lever locks, which use a push key. The Bauche Monopole lock, for example, is based on Aubin's Vibrating guard lock.

There has not always been universal agreement on which variants of the basic design merit the terms "lever lock" or "detainer lock" or both. Some authors use the term "detainer lock" to refer specifically to variants where the gates are "open" (i.e. at the edge of the lever), rather than "closed" (i.e. entirely surrounded by the lever). The Chubb lock company chose to use the term "detainer" in its patent for the lock design deriving ultimately from Strutt's 1818 lock, in which a probe (originally, one end of a bell-crank) briefly interrogates the edges of end-gated levers.

=== Three-lever locks ===
A three-lever lock is a common type of lever door lock now generally used for low security privacy applications such as internal doors in Britain as their tolerances are lower. There are fewer key differs available, so they might unlock doors they should not. In the past, two- and four-lever door locks were also common.

=== Five-lever locks ===
A five-lever lock is often required for home insurance in Britain for wooden exterior doors and recommended by the police for home security. There are various grades but the current British Standard (BS 3621:2017+A1:2024) is usually required for insurance purposes. Such locks have features, in addition to five levers, to resist a variety of attacks. Locksmith Valerie Olifent states that, "The doors of many historic churches still carry an old wooden lock although often you find that a modern 5-lever mortice lock has been installed alongside it to meet insurance requirements." BS3621:2007 requires a bolt throw of 20 mm rather than the 14 mm of the earlier British Standard.

Most BS3621 lever locks incorporate anti-pick devices built in to reduce the chance of lock picking, along with physical robustness such as hardened bolts and anti-drill plates to reduce risk of physical attack.

With less standardisation of lock sizes, lever locks can be more expensive to fit than modern tubular cylinder locks.

=== Other lever locks ===
There are many realisations of lever locks, but only a few have achieved lasting success in the market place. In France, for example, four-lever door locks are used, but as in many countries, are losing popularity to pin tumbler cylinder locks. In Italy, double-bit lever locks using sliding levers are used.

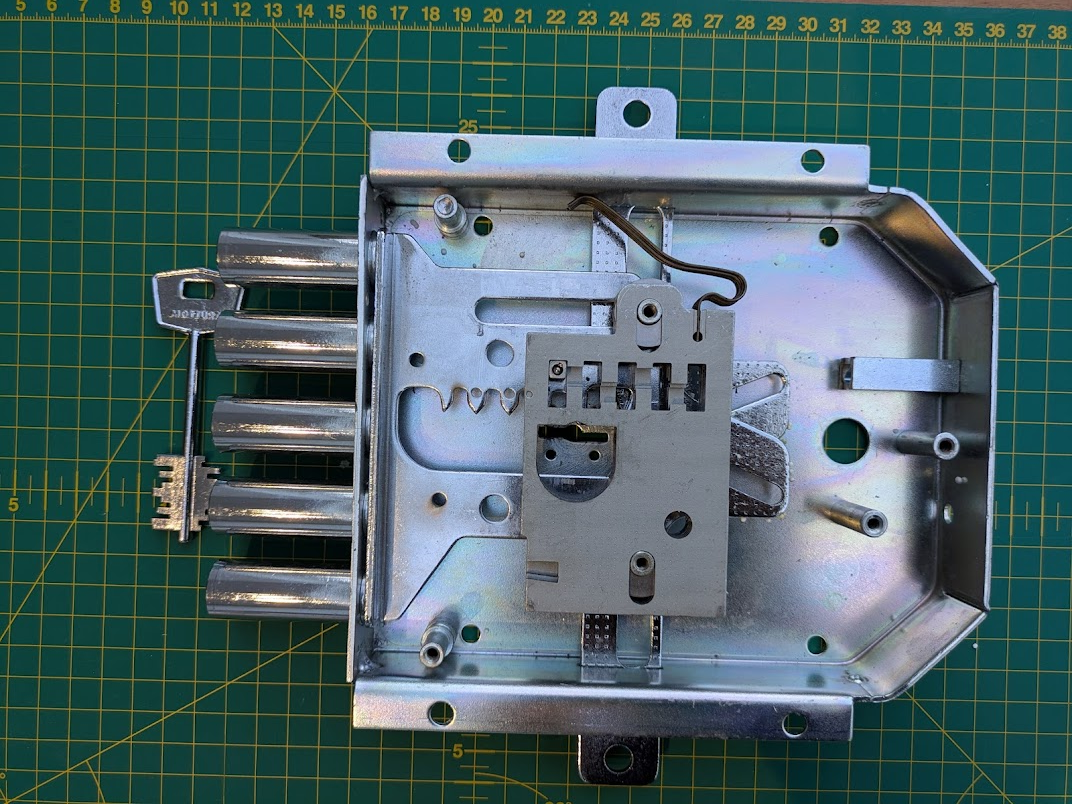
Italian-style double-bit double-throw 6-lever multipoint lock

In these locks, for each complete turn of the key the bolt is moved two half-throws. The locks are often double-throw, requiring two complete key turns making four half-throws of the bolt. Locks are made in rim and mortise fitting, also with multipoint bolts, and have from four to twelve levers. There are commonly three to five saw-resistant bolts, and sometimes a latchbolt, each about the size of a US tubular deadbolt. Double-throw locks have a bolt throw around 40mm/1½". Such locks are used in parts of South America, India, Eastern Europe, and elsewhere. They are also used in armoured doors.

Lever locks are commonly used on safes in Britain and Europe for speed and convenience of use. They typically have from seven levers upwards. There are also change-key locks, which provide a quick and easy combination change. In some locks, this is achieved by buying a different key and using it to lock the lock, which can only be unlocked by the key combination which last locked it.

Some lever cylinder locking devices have been invented, but few have achieved much success in the market place. Notable successes include the Kromer Protector, Ingersoll Impregnable cylinder, and the AVA cylinder.

==== Parsons Balance Lock ====
Another form of ‘lever’ lock was Thomas Parsons’ Balance Lock [GB8350] of 1832. This originally had a plurality of levers pivoted around their midpoint (earlier levers were pivoted at one endpoint) below the bolt tail, each lever having a hook (of differing lengths) at both ends. Spring pressure pressed the hooks at one end into a notch in the bolt tail, (locking the bolt against movement). The key steps pushed on the other ends of the levers. The key bit pressed those ends towards the bolt, which had notches for these hooks also. (There are two notches each end of the bolt tail, for the shot and withdrawn positions of the bolt.) The correct key balanced every lever with neither end hooking into the bolt. Because the balance levers take little strain, they can be thin, so that using 7 was common, and up to 20 in some safe locks. This linear lock enjoyed considerable success in the 19th C. A cylinder locking device version made by CAWI [Carl Wittkopp GmbH, now part of Gunnebo Safe Storage] appeared in 1951, using essentially the same idea, differently realised.

=== Masterkeying ===
The great majority of all locks in use are not masterkeyed. Several methods of mastering lever locks have been invented, but are little used today. Lever locks are not the most suitable lock for mastering. Since the 1920s, the ease, cheapness, and flexibility of mastering pin tumbler locks has largely displaced masterkeying of lever locks, especially in institutional buildings. Wafer tumbler locks, also easy to masterkey if needed, have largely displaced lever cabinet locks.

=== Vulnerabilities ===
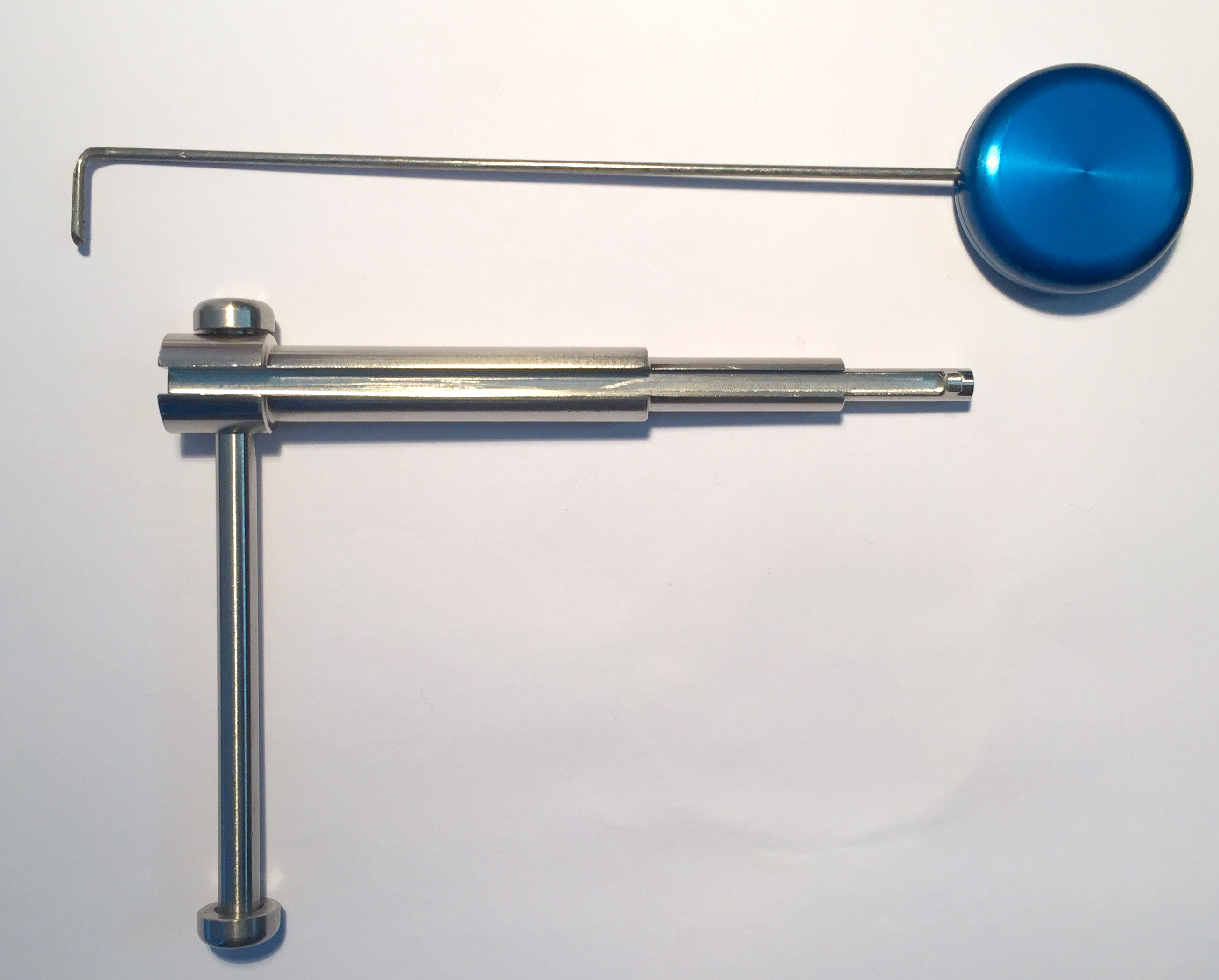
A type of lock pick used to pick some lever tumbler locks

Lever tumbler locks (in common with other locks) are vulnerable to a variety of attacks, depending on their design. However, they are generally larger and more robust than the more commonly used pin tumbler cylinder lock, so more resistant to attack.

Tentative picking is increasingly difficult as the number of levers increases, together with close gating. Many security locks also incorporate features which hamper manipulation, and additionally, (just as in pin tumbler locks), warding is also sometimes used to this end.

Tools to pick and decode lever locks are not as widely available as their pin-tumbler counterparts, largely because the tools required are more laborious to make, and expensive, and are more likely to be specialized to a specific model of lock, unlike pin tumbler and wafer tumbler picks.

However, devices do exist and can be effective. In general, well-made lever locks incorporating several pick-resisting features are likely to be physically stronger and more resistant to manipulation than comparable pin tumbler cylinder locks. They are likely to be larger, and typically have slightly larger keys. Lever locks in widespread use tend to have fewer differs than comparable pin tumbler cylinder locks, although trial of keys is hindered by the greater weight of keys needed and the slower rate at which they can be tested. Keys for different models of lever locks have a considerable variety of sizes, further impeding trial of keys.

Alfred Hobbs invented a picking device called a 2-in-1 pick for picking lever locks. This is inserted into the keyhole of the lock, and a force is applied to the locking bolt. The pick is then used to lift each lever inside the lock to the correct height so that the locking bolt can pass.

Higher security lever locks (such as the British five-lever lock conforming to BS3261 and many lever safe locks) usually have false notches cut into the levers. These catch the bolt stump and prevent it from moving if picking is attempted (similar to the security pins in a pin tumbler lock). The addition of the conjoined barrel and curtain (now simply called 'curtain') which blocks further access to the keyhole as soon as the curtain is turned, by the key or pick, hampers the use of Hobbs' design of 2-in-1 pick. Other designs of pick have been made to defeat the curtain.

The Chubb detector lock is a variation of the lever lock which was designed to detect and signal to the keyholder a picking attempt or use of an incorrect key. It also hampers picking attempts. Other pick-resisting features may be present.

Lever locks can be defeated by drilling, but the drilling point is not visible externally, unlike the pin tumbler cylinder lock. Many security locks incorporate drill-resisting protection.

Lever locks are not susceptible to either bumping or snapping attacks.

== See also ==
- Warded lock
- Mortise lock
- Lock picking
