= Robert Barron (locksmith) =

British locksmith

- Born: United Kingdom
- Occupation: Locksmith
- Known for: Invention of the tumbler lock

Robert Barron was an English locksmith notable for his invention of the double–acting tumbler lock in 1778, also recognized as the level tumbler lock. This invention was patented the same year. At the time of the patent, he lived in the city of London.
