= Key blank =

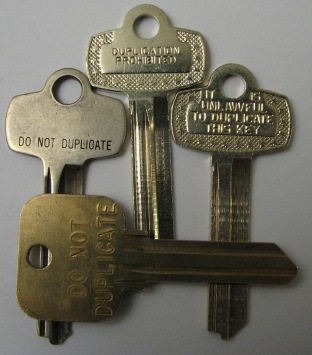
Keyblanks pre-stamped with various imprints to discourage key duplication.

A key blank (sometimes spelled keyblank) is a key that has not been cut to a specific bitting. The blank has a specific cross-sectional profile to match the keyway in a corresponding lock cylinder. Key blanks can be stamped with a manufacturer name, end-user logo or with a phrase, the most commonly seen being 'Do not duplicate'. Blanks are typically stocked by locksmiths for duplicating keys. The profile of the key bow, or the large, flat end, is often characteristic of an individual manufacturer.

In many territories, keys stamped with "Do not duplicate" or "It is unlawful to duplicate this key" are protected from unauthorised duplication by patent or registered design and the dealers (often locksmiths) being conditionally licensed to distribute the keys by the owner of the design (the manufacturer). Once a patented or registered design has expired, it is no longer legally protected from unauthorised duplication, however the license agreement may continue to restrict the distributor, and some trade organisations have ethical standards that prevent members from duplicating such keys. In other territories, they are perfectly legal to duplicate. Some key blank manufacturers strictly restrict the sale of their own blanks. Some blanks are made only in small volumes and are not widely available.

The State of California prohibits locksmiths from copying keys marked "Do Not Duplicate" or "Unlawful to Duplicate", provided the key originator's company name and telephone number are included on the key.

Associated Locksmiths of America (ALOA), an internationally recognized as the North American association for locksmiths, considers such stamps to be ineffective at providing security.

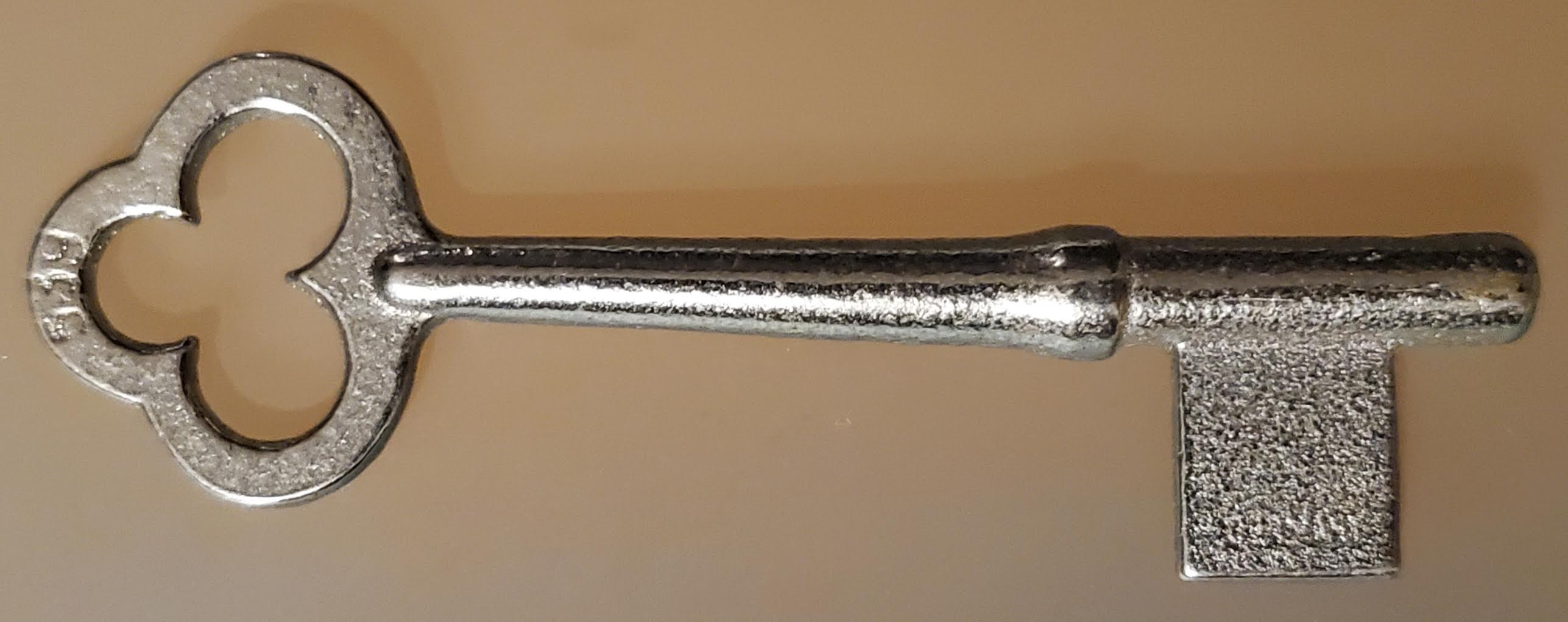
Blank of Taylor 539 bit key

== See also ==
- Key relevance
- Lock and key
- Lock picking
