= Snap gun =

Lock picking tool

A traditional snap gun with several parts

A snap gun, also known as lock pick gun, pick gun, or electric lock pick, is a tool that can be used to open a mechanical pin tumbler lock (a common type of cylinder lock) without using the key. A thin steel blade, similar in shape to a lock pick, is inserted into the lock and the snap gun briefly fires the blade against all of the lock pins simultaneously, momentarily freeing the cylinder and enabling it to be turned using a tension wrench. The snap gun is an alternative to a conventional lockpick, which requires other techniques such as raking to free the pins.

== History ==
Louis S. Hanflig patented the first snap gun in the United States in 1934. Subsequent designs were patented by Segal Samuel in 1943 and William J. Miskill in 1951.

The earliest snap guns were developed to assist police officers in opening locks without the additional training required for traditional lockpicking techniques. Although lock picking is often associated with crime, snap guns are not commonly used by criminals. Some legal jurisdictions may classify snap guns as burglary tools or otherwise limit their possession. A person may then be required to be a police officer or locksmith by trade, or to have some other legal sanction, to be in possession of a snap gun.

== Usage ==
A pin tumbler lock normally contains a set of bottom pins and a set of driver pins. The bottom pins move within pin channels inside the cylinder assembly and are cut at different lengths corresponding to the lock keying. The driver pins are installed in the lock housing and spring pressure forces them to penetrate the lock cylinder and prevent it from turning. If the wrong key is inserted, it will variously push the bottom pins either too high or not high enough, and the lock cylinder cannot turn. When the bottom pins are correctly aligned by the key, the top pins are exactly aligned with the barrel of the cylinder, and it may freely turn.

A traditional lock pick uses trial-and-error methods to find the correct alignment of the locking pins. The snap gun uses a primary law of physics, the transfer of energy, to momentarily burst all of the driver pins out of the lock cylinder without sending the bottom pins up into it. The snap gun strikes all of the bottom pins at once with a strong impact, and then withdraws again. The bottom pins transfer their kinetic energy to the top pins and come to a complete stop without penetrating the lock housing. The driver pins are thrown out of the cylinder body entirely up into the lock housing. Until the springs force the driver pins back into the cylinder, the lock cylinder is momentarily unobstructed. The physical effect of the impact is similar to the game of billiards, where the cue stick first strikes the cue ball, transferring kinetic energy into the cue ball. The cue ball then strikes a target ball. Since the two balls are very elastic, and since the target ball is free to move, the cue ball (representing a bottom pin) comes to a complete stop at the point of impact and the target ball (representing a driver pin) continues moving with most of the kinetic energy that was formerly in the cue ball.

The same physical principles are involved in lock bumping, but the snap gun automates the transfer-of-energy process. A correctly applied snap gun can open a lock very quickly compared to traditional lock picking, but the sharp impact is more likely to damage the lock mechanism than raking, which mimics normal key movements.
