= BiLock =

Lock and key system

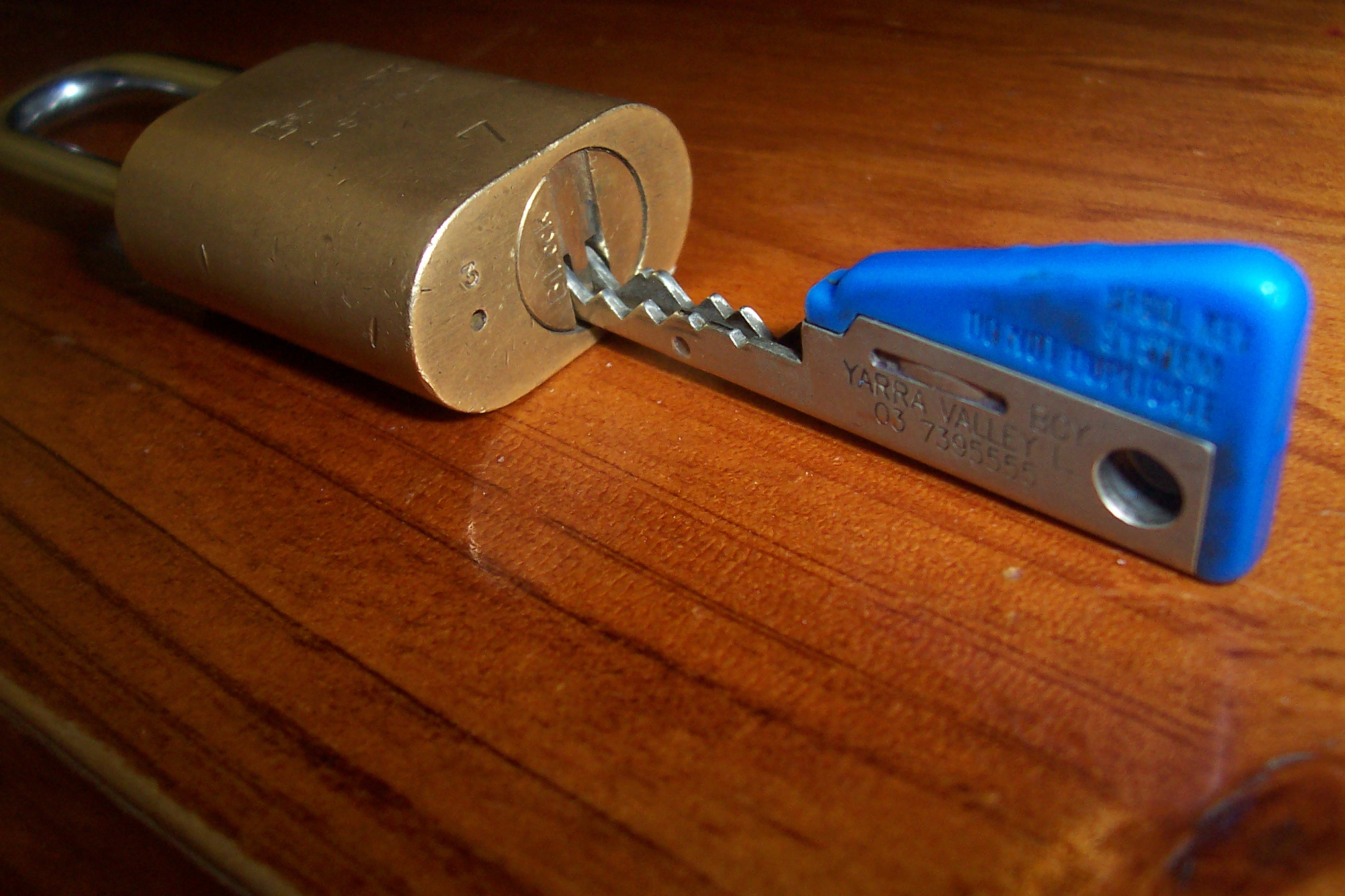
A BiLock padlock

Bilock is a high-security keying system designed and manufactured by Australian Lock Company. It is advertised to be bump-proof, pick-resistant, and drill-resistant. The Bilock cylinder uses a patented locking system with two sidebars, 12 pins, and 12 springs. In the New Generation Bilock, a trigger pin has been added to increase security and extend the registered design of the product. The key design is a U-shape profile with six cuts on each side of the key, along with a central roller to activate the trigger pin in the front and center of the cylinder.

In order for the lock to operate, the key must be fully inserted, allowing the dual sidebars to enter the pins, provided the pins were raised to the correct height, thereby freeing the cylinder core for rotation. The cylinder does not use the traditional top- and bottom-pin combination, relying instead only on the holes in the side of the pins and pressure applied by the 12 springs above. Many pins have a dummy hole which will trap the sidebar pin if any turning pressure is applied to the lock with the pin in the incorrect position, preventing the lock from opening. Due to the lack of top pins, lock bumping is theoretically impossible; because bumping requires a moment in time when the two pins separate, and when this occurs and turning pressure is applied, the cylinder will rotate, thereby causing the lock to open. This bumping technique uses the principles of Newton's cradle.

== See also ==
- Medeco
- Assa Abloy
- Disc tumbler lock
