= Key relevance =

Concept in locksmithing

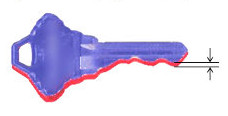
The difference in size between the original key (blue) and its copy (red) is 0.023mm, an accuracy of 0.61%. This is an acceptable level of tolerance.

In master locksmithing, key relevance is the measurable difference between an original key and a copy made of that key, either from a wax impression or directly from the original, and how similar the two keys are in size and shape. It can also refer to the measurable difference between a key and the size required to fit and operate the keyway of its paired lock.

No two copies of keys are exactly the same, even if they were both made from key blanks that are struck from the same mould or cut from the same duplicating/milling machine with no changes to the bitting settings in between. Even under these favorable circumstances, there will be minute differences between the two key shapes, though their key relevance is extremely high.

In all machining work, there are measurable amounts of difference between the design specification of an object, and its actual manufactured size. In locksmithing, the allowable tolerance is decided by the range of minute differences between a key's size and shape in comparison to the size and shape required to turn the tumblers within the lock. Key relevance is the measure of similarity between the key and the optimal size needed to fit the lock, or it is the similarity between a duplicate key and the original it is seeking to replicate.

Key relevance cannot be deduced from a key code, since the key code merely refers to a central authoritative source for designed shapes and sizes of keys.

Typical modern keys require a key relevance of approximately 0.03 to 0.07 millimetres (0.0012 to 0.0028 in) (accuracy within 0.75% to 1.75%) in order to operate.

== Other applications ==
"Key relevance" may also be applied to types of electronic locks when used to refer to similarities in magnetic signatures or radio codes, though truly digital-coded radio signals do not have key relevance ratings because they must have precise unlocking codes, with no degree of difference whatsoever in order to operate.

The term has also occasionally been co-opted by broader mechanical engineering to refer to the similarity of fit between two interlocking machined parts, although "tolerance" or "backlash" has gained far wider adoption and acceptance in usage.

== See also ==
- Margin of error
- Process capability
- Specification
- Engineering tolerance
- Tolerance stacks
