= Locksport =

Recreation of defeating locking systems

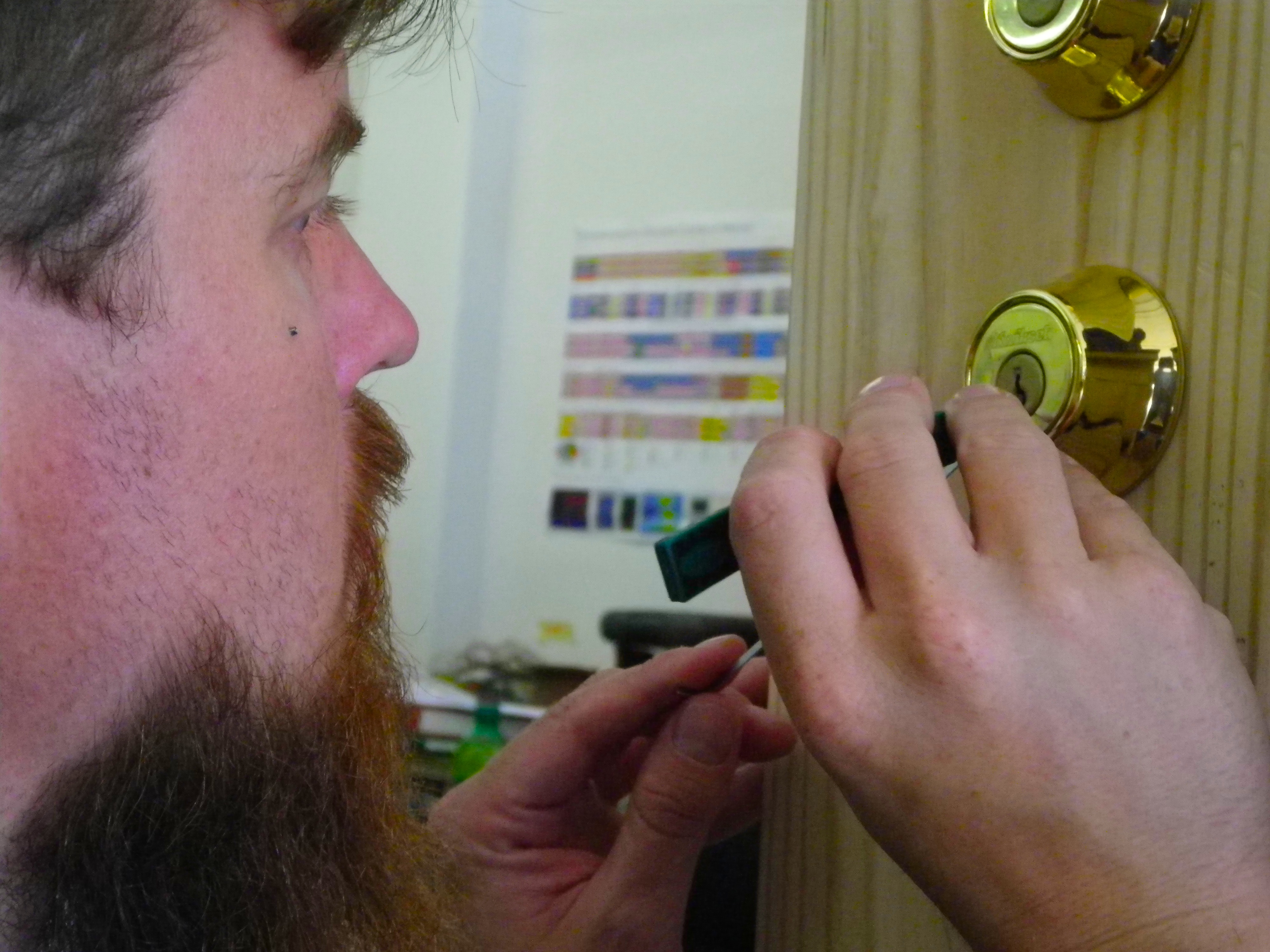
Lock-picking at a Noisebridge locksport event

Locksport is the sport or recreation of defeating locking systems. Its enthusiasts learn a variety of skills including lock picking, lock bumping, and a variety of other skills traditionally known only to locksmiths and other security professionals. Locksport followers enjoy the challenge and excitement of learning to defeat all forms of locks, and often gather together in sport groups to share knowledge, exchange ideas, and participate in a variety of recreational activities and contests.

== History ==
Lock picking has existed for as long as locks have, and recreational lock picking has as well. King Louis XVI of France (1754–1793) was a keen designer, picker, and manipulator of locks.

Notes from the MIT Roof and Tunnel Hacking community were made widely available in 1991 as The MIT Guide to Lock Picking.

However, as an organized hobby, lock picking is a relatively recent phenomenon. The earliest known organized group of lock picking enthusiasts is the German club SSDeV (Sportsfreunde der Sperrtechnik – Deutschland e.V., which translates as Sports Enthusiasts of Lockpicking – Germany, reg. assoc.). SSDeV was founded by Steffen Wernéry in 1997. As the group grew in Germany, another group was founded in The Netherlands in 1999. This group, originally called NVHS, and currently called TOOOL (The Open Organisation Of Lockpickers), has also helped to pioneer the collaborative hobby of lock picking.

The term locksport was adopted by lock picking enthusiasts as a way of differentiating what they do from locksmiths, as well as from those who might choose to pick locks for nefarious purposes. As of early 2005, the term had been suggested, but not widely adopted. The creation of the sport group Locksport International in July 2005, founded by Josh Nekrep, Kim Bohnet, and Devon McDormand of LockPicking101.com, helped to solidify the term within the community, and today the term is widely adopted in North America by those who practice the craft for fun and sport. Locksport International is now under the direction of Doug Farre.

== Philosophy ==
At the core of locksport is the philosophical belief in responsible full disclosure. Locksport enthusiasts target security through obscurity that is common within the locksmith industry, as well as among lock manufacturers. Those who choose to participate in locksport often seek to discover security vulnerabilities and notify lock manufacturers as well as, in some instances, the public, in an effort to promote improvements in the field of physical security and to aid consumers in making better, more informed decisions about their own security. This philosophy is contradictory to that held by many locksmith organizations, and locksport enthusiasts have come under attack for releasing information about lesser-known vulnerabilities. Nonetheless, locksport enthusiasts persist in discovering weaknesses in all forms of physical security.

== Activities ==
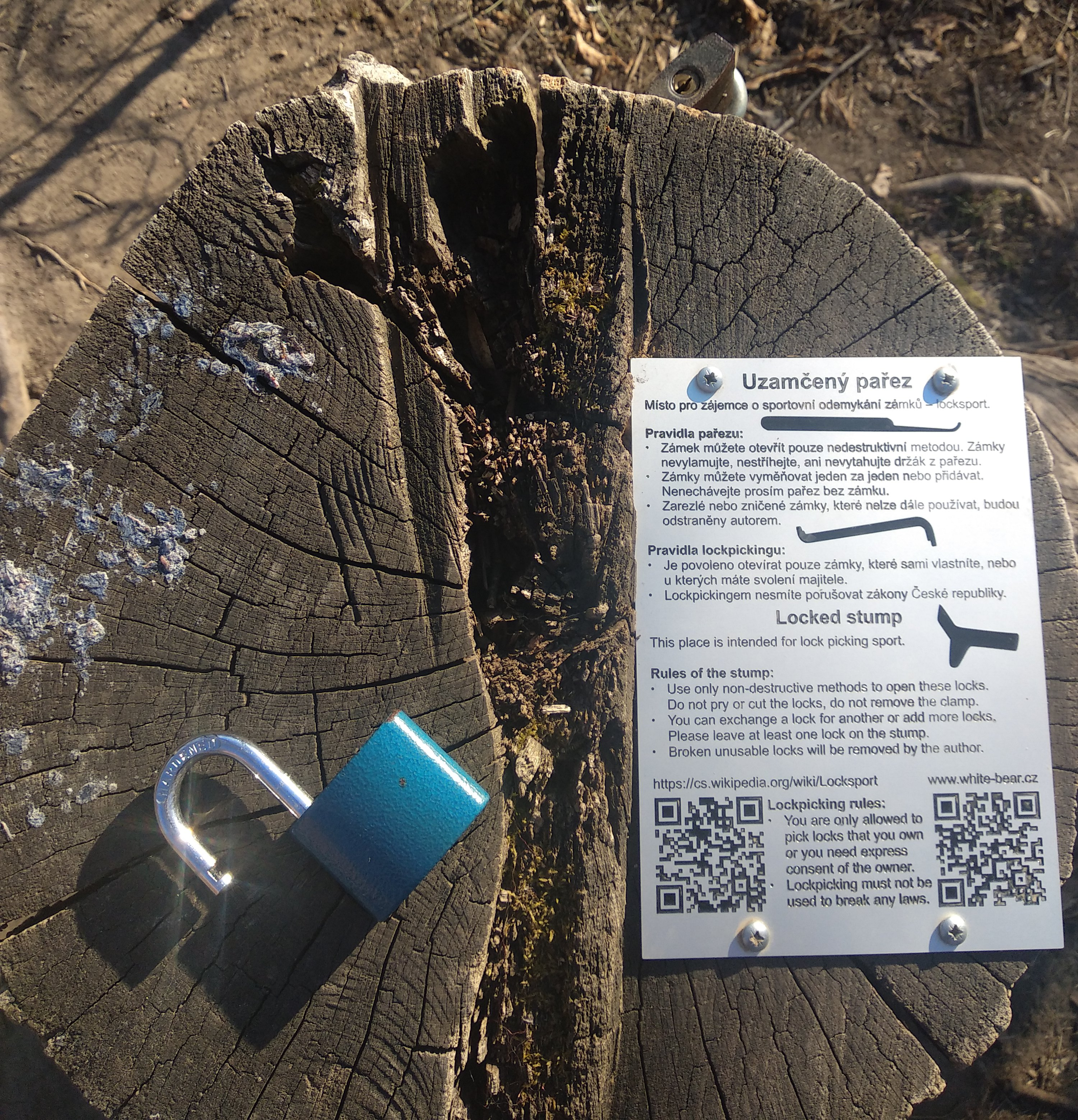
A public "locked stump" in Brno, Czechia, where lock pickers are invited to remove an existing padlock and place another of their own

At locksport meetings, members regularly participate in a variety of activities such as lock challenges, lock relay races, standardized tests, and many other such activities dreamed up by the members themselves. Many enthusiasts support each other through online groups and forums such as Facebook, where a number of locksport groups are available to join for those looking to get into the sport.

One such activity is known as the Padlock Challenge, where members each start with a predefined number of padlocks linked together. As participants pick a lock, they attach the lock to the chain of padlocks of another participant. The goal is to be the first to rid oneself of all one's locks. Another common activity is some form of speed challenge, where members are given a limited time to pick a lock, or compete for the best time on one or more locks.

The Open Organisation Of Lockpickers (TOOOL) Netherlands chapter engages in two types of competitions. Stefaan Offerman conceived the 'continuous competition', which runs throughout the year and offers participants the chance to thoroughly familiarize themselves with 20 to 30 different competition locks. Competitors can attempt to pick a specific lock as many times as they wish, with only their fastest time being recorded. The results from previous competitions can be found on the TOOOL Netherlands website.

Since 2002, Toool has also been organizing the 'Dutch Open' lockpicking championships. This event attracts lockpickers from various countries, including Germany, France, the Netherlands, and the United States. Unlike the continuous competition, the Dutch Open provides a new lock for each round. Since 2008, the Dutch Open has been held during LockCon.

== Contests ==
There are several organized lock picking contests that are held each year. Both SSDeV and TOOOL.NL hold a major contest each year, attended by hobbyists and travellers from around the globe. In North America, contests are held at the Defcon Convention in Las Vegas each year, and the HOPE Convention every second year. Rules and format of contests vary from event to event.

"Locksport fans compete in several formats, including head-to-head contests that determine the fastest lock picker. In the so-called Locksport Wizard, each contestant is given a burlap sack containing an identical set of locks and is required to blindly pick them using only tools they have put in the sack."

In other challenges, participants have to pick their way out of handcuffs before attempting to defeat a set of locks. There also are competitions to disassemble locks and reassemble them properly.

== Conventions ==
There are currently several conventions exclusive to locksport. This includes conventions such as LockCon (formerly The Dutch Open), LockFest EU and OzSecCon Australia. These conferences include talks on locks and physical security technologies, as well as competitions between participants in different types of opening techniques. Enthusiasts have also found acceptance among a variety of hacker conventions. DEFCON and HOPE are the most notable. At each of these conventions a dedicated area called "The Lock Picking Village" is set up where contests and presentations are held. Here, attendees can learn to pick locks and watch others practice and compete.

== Ethics ==
Because lock picking is sometimes viewed as a nefarious craft, locksport enthusiasts uphold a very rigorous standard of ethics.

Locksporters abide by the following rules in order to make it clear to the people outside of the community that its activities are within ethical boundaries:

- They may not open a lock that is in use.
- They may open only locks that belong to them. For other locks, they need express consent of the owner.
- A lock which has been effectively abandoned by its owner and placed in a public place without securing anything (i.e., not "in use", such as a lock placed on a "lovewall") may ethically be picked by any locksporter, provided the lock is returned to its original locked position and state. Permanently removing (or relocating) the lock may be done only when lawfully and specifically sanctioned by an appropriate authority (usually the lawful landowner upon which the lock is placed, which may be a department of governance).
- The security needs of others must be preserved.
- All activities take place within boundaries of respectability, integrity and professionalism.

In an effort to keep lock-picking skill away from those who would abuse it, members of locksport groups have zero tolerance for illegal or immoral lock picking, bypass, or other forms of entry. Though the incidence of lock picking for crime is statistically low, locksport enthusiasts feel they must uphold such strict standards to refute the common misconception that they are participating in illegal activities.
