= Bitting =

Bitting may refer to:

- Bitting (key), the cuts made to a key
- the setup of a horse's bit
- in a nautical context, the fastening of a cable upon a bitt
