= Relocker =

A relocker is one of various mechanisms intended to keep a safe or vault locked in a burglary attempt.

There are two basic classes of relockers:

- Relock trigger (RLT), an internal relocker built into the primary lock
- Relocking device (RLD), an external relocker, which is a separate mechanism installed in the safe
