= The Open Organisation of Lockpickers =

The Open Organisation of Lockpickers or TOOOL is an organization of individuals who partake in the hobby of locksport, as well as educate its members and the public about the security provided by locks.

It has two main chapters based in The Netherlands, where it originated. After opening in the United States of America in 2004, it has established several chapters located in the United States including ones in major cities such as Detroit, Boston, Washington, D.C., and Philadelphia, many of which meet regularly.

== Mission ==
The mission of the Open Organisation of Lockpickers is to advance public knowledge about locks and lockpicking. TOOOL hopes to educate the public by examining locks, safes, and other such hardware and by publicly discussing findings.

TOOOL asserts that "the more that people know about lock technology, the better they are capable of understanding how and where certain weaknesses are present. This makes them well-equipped to participate in sportpicking endeavors and also helps them to simply be better consumers in the marketplace, making decisions based on sound fact and research."

== Legal concerns ==
In the Netherlands, the law allows possession of lockpicking tools as long as there is no intent on using them unlawfully. TOOOL members have to adhere to a code of conduct that includes, among other things, to remain professional in their activities and not to use the skills learned for anti-social activities.

The US organization has a table on their website which explains the lock picking laws in each state: https://www.toool.us/lockpicking-laws

== Lock bumping ==
In 2005, the technique of lock bumping was brought to public attention when members of TOOOL first drafted a white paper describing the technique, then went on a Dutch national television show, Nova, to describe the technique to the general public. TOOOL has since cooperated with consumer groups in testing the resistance of various locks to the technique.

== Events ==
TOOOL is responsible for hosting or co-hosting many of the lockpicking areas of popular hacker conferences around the world including DEF CON and HOPE. The Netherlands branch of TOOOL also hosts its own conference and competition—LockCon and the Dutch Open. The Dutch Open began in 2008 and is held during LockCon.

TOOOL attracted media attention when it hosted a "Love Picking" event to preserve locks on the Brooklyn Bridge.

== Similar organisations ==
- OpenLocks.at (Austria)
- Locksport International (Canada)
- Lockpicking i zabezpieczenia (Poland)
- Schlösser picken als Schweizer Sport (Switzerland)
- Guide de Crochetage des serrures a Goupilles (France)
- Sportsfreunde der Sperrtechnik - Deutschland e.V. (Germany)

== See also ==
- Lock picking
- Lock bumping
- Lock (security device)
