= Disc tumbler lock =

Finnish lock mechanism using rotating disc tumblers with angled cuts

The underside of a disc tumbler lock

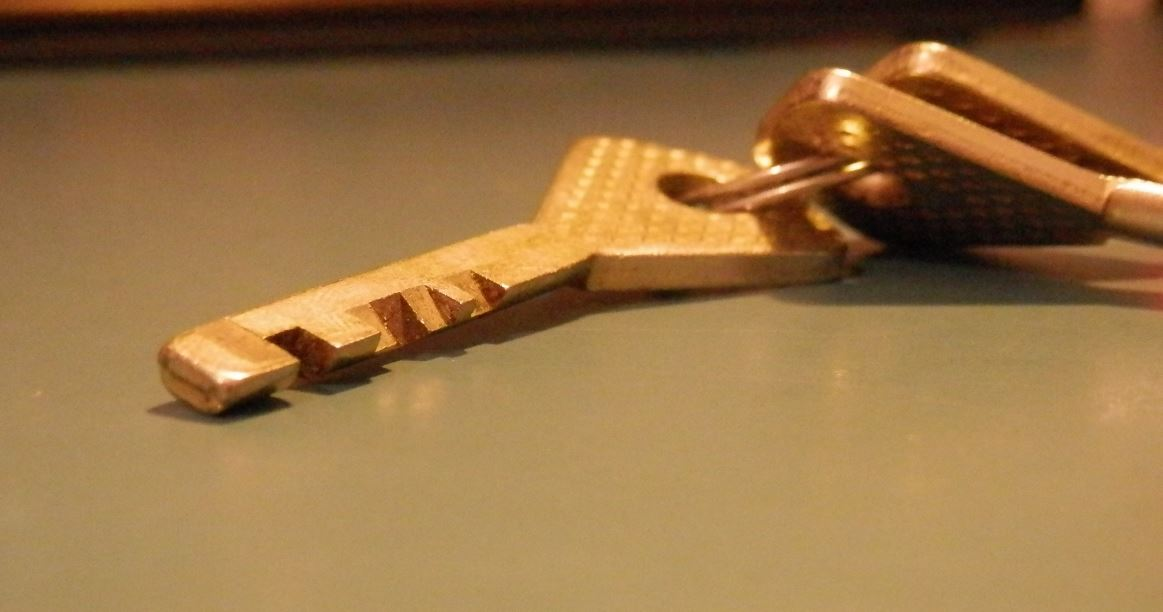
A key for a disc tumbler lock

A disc tumbler or disc detainer lock is a lock composed of slotted rotating detainer discs. The lock was invented by Finnish founder of Abloy, Emil Henriksson (1886–1959) in 1907 and first manufactured under the Abloy brand in 1918. (Note: Emil Vilhelm Henriksson was born in Helsinki, Finland on 24 February 1886. He became a mechanic specializing in office equipment. In 1907, he was repairing a mechanical cash register when he realized that its rotating cylindrical disks could be used as the basis of a lock. After two years, he had developed the first disc tumbler lock. In 1918 he applied for a patent, which was granted on 15 February 1919. Also in 1918, he formed the Ab Låsfabriken-Lukkotehdas Oy company (Ab Låsfabriken = Ltd. Lock Co. (in Swedish) and Lukkotehdas Oy = Lock Co. Ltd. (in Finnish)). (The name was subsequently shortened to "Ab Lukko Oy" and finally to "Abloy".) He died in Helsinki on 19 December 1959.)

== Design ==
Disc tumbler locks are composed of slotted rotating detainer discs. A specially cut key rotates these discs like the tumblers of a safe to align the slots, allowing the sidebar to drop into the slots, thus opening the lock. Unlike a wafer tumbler lock or a pin tumbler lock, this mechanism does not use springs. Because they do not contain springs, they are better suited for areas with harsh conditions and are often used at outdoor locations like railroad and public utility installations.

The original Abloy Classic design consists of a notched semi-cylindrical key, and a lock with detainer discs with holes ranging from a semicircle (180°) to a 3/4 circle (270°). The key is inserted and rotated 90°. Notches, machined to an angle, correspond to complementary angles in the holes of the discs. Thus, the misalignment of the slots is "corrected" by a rotation to the correct angle. For example, if the hole is 270°, the key is 180°, and if the hole is 240° (270° minus 30°), the key is 150° (180° with 30° notch) of the circle. In addition, there is a notch in the perimeter of each disc. A sidebar inside an opening in the lock cylinder around the discs and an edge in the casing obstruct the movement of the cylinder beyond the 90°.

When a correct key is inserted and turned, all the discs will rotate so that notches in the perimeters line up. This allows a sidebar to drop from the cylinder into the groove made by the lined-up notches in the discs, so that it does not obstruct the cylinder, allowing the cylinder to rotate and open the lock. If a key with one wrong notch is used, one disc will be rotated to an incorrect angle, thus its notch will not line up with the rest, and the lock cannot be unlocked.

The lock is locked again by rotating it into the other direction, sliding the sidebar back into the cylinder opening and allowing the straight edge of the key to return the discs to the scrambled "zero" position.

The mechanism makes it easy to construct locks that can be opened with multiple different keys: "blank" discs with a circular hole are used, and only notches shared by the keys are employed in the lock mechanism. This is commonly used for locks of common areas such as garages in apartment houses.

== Lock picking ==
Disc tumblers tend to be more difficult to pick than competitively priced pin tumbler locks, and are often sold as "high security" locks for that reason. Picking the lock is not impossible but typically requires dedicated tools. They may also require more time to pick. They are similar in difficulty to pick as curtained 5-lever locks. The disc tumbler lock cannot be bumped. This level of difficulty tends to drive attention to alternative methods of gaining entry. More expensive locks have false gates which are similar to security pins on pin tumbler locks; catching the sidebar making one think they have picked a disc when in fact they have not.

The locking mechanism can be disabled destructively by drilling into the lock to destroy the sidebar. Anti-drilling plates can be installed to prevent this.

Alternatively, for cheaper locks, the discs can be bypassed by inserting a screwdriver or similar device to apply torque, causing the retaining clip to pop off and the core of the lock to spill out. The same effect can be created by turning a torque tool in the lock until the end cap pops off. After this, cheap plastic locks can be turned by hand, pulled out with pliers, or deformed by heating, causing the lock to open, or completely fall apart. More expensive disc tumbler locks use metal parts that can defeat this technique or make it more difficult.
