= Shear line =

Shear line may refer to:

- Shear line (locksmithing)
- Shear line (meteorology)
