= Pin tumbler lock =

Type of Lock mechanism using spring-loaded pins that align at shear line

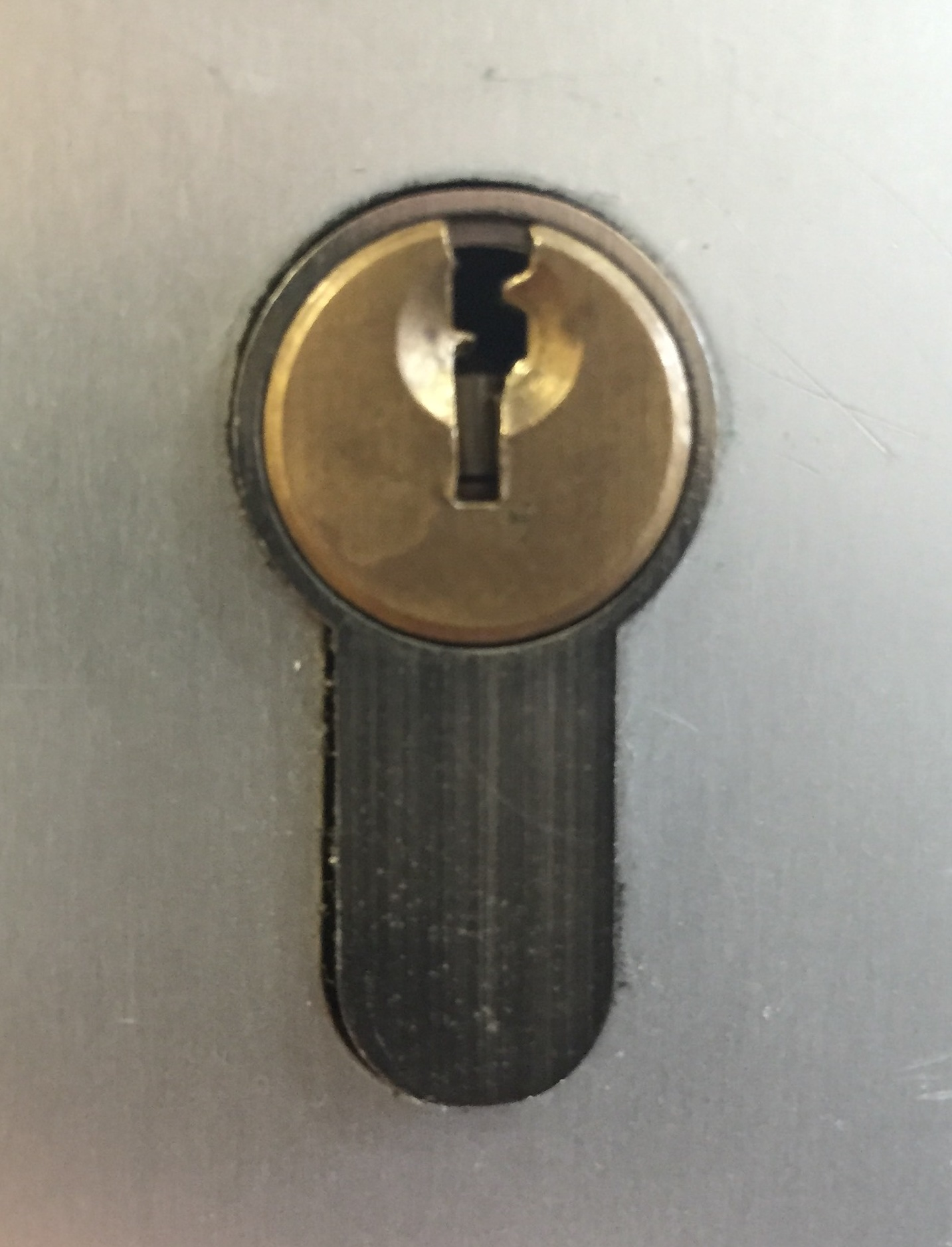
A common type of pin tumbler lock, of the euro cylinder type

The pin tumbler lock, also known as the Yale lock (after Linus Yale Jr) is a lock mechanism that uses a series of spring-loaded pins of varying lengths to prevent the lock from opening without the correct key. When the correct key is inserted the pins align precisely, allowing the plug within the lock cylinder to rotate freely, thereby unlocking the mechanism. If the wrong key is used, the pins remain misaligned, preventing the plug from turning and securing the lock against unauthorized access. It is one of the most widely used and enduring lock mechanisms in the world.

Pin tumblers are most commonly employed in cylinder locks, but may also be found in tubular pin tumbler locks (also known as radial locks or ace locks).

== History ==
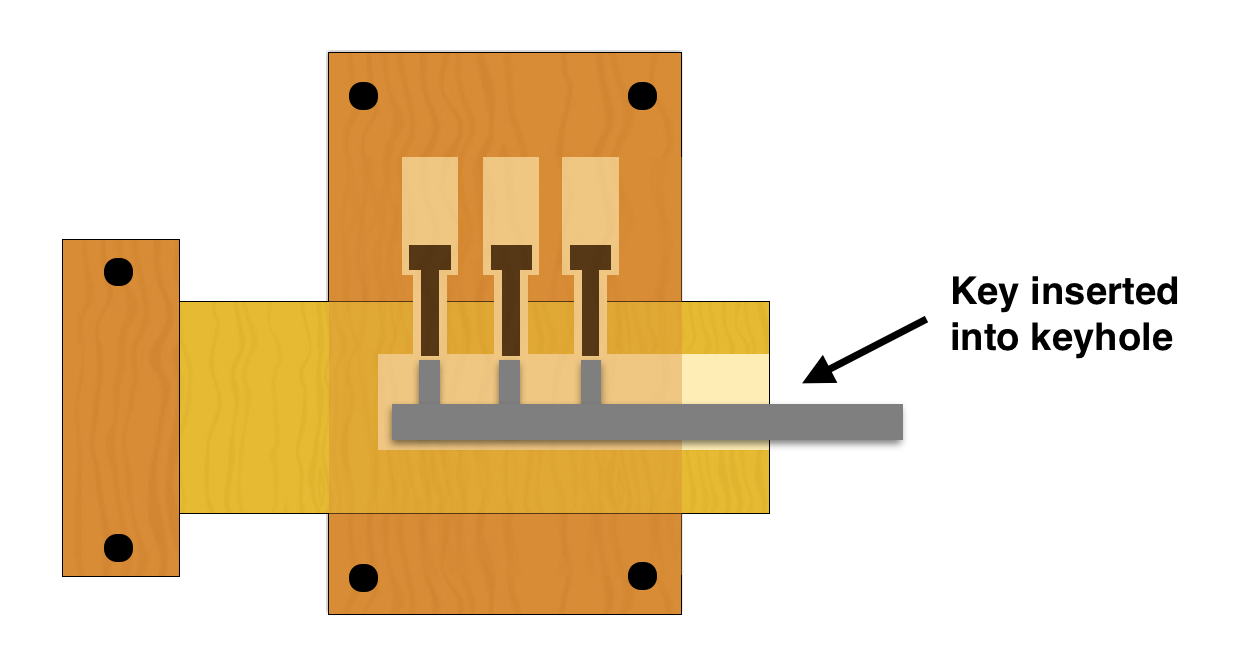
The key is inserted into the lock bolt, and the pins are lifted

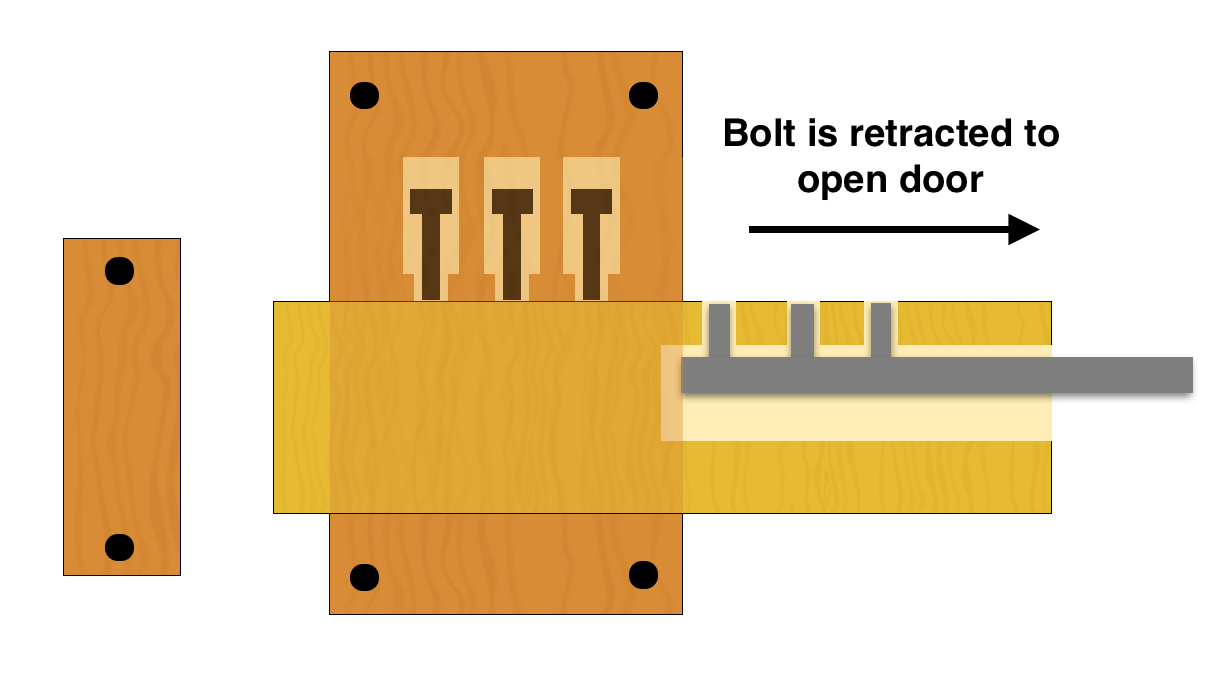
The key is then pulled out of the lock along with the deadbolt

An early example of a tumbler lock was found in the ruins of the Palace of Khorsabad built by king Sargon II (721–705 BC.) in Iraq. Basic principles of the pin tumbler lock may date as far back as 2000 BC in Egypt; the lock consisted of a wooden post affixed to the door and a horizontal bolt that slid into the post. The bolt had vertical openings into which a set of pins fitted. These could be lifted, using a key, to a sufficient height to allow the bolt to move and unlock the door. There is also linguistic and archaeological evidence that pin tumbler locks existed in ancient Mesopotamia, including physical artifacts found at Nimrud, prior to its destruction by ISIS in 2015.

Locks such as the wooden Egyptian lock, however, may be defeated by lifting the pins uniformly beyond the unlatching point. In 1805, the earliest patent for a double-acting pin tumbler lock – one where lifting the pins too much or too little prevented opening – was granted to American physician Abraham O. Stansbury in England. It was based on earlier Egyptian locks and Joseph Bramah's tubular pin tumbler lock. Two years later, Stansbury was granted a patent in the United States for his lock. In 1848, Linus Yale Sr. invented the modern pin-tumbler lock. Later, in 1861, his son Linus Yale Jr. invented and patented a smaller flat key with serrated edges, as well as pins of varying lengths within the lock itself, the same design of the pin-tumbler lock in use today.

== Design ==
Without a key in the lock, the driver pins (blue) are pushed downwards, preventing the plug (yellow) from rotating.

When the correct key is inserted, the gaps between the key pins (red) and driver pins align with the boundary between the plug and the bible.

With the gaps between the pins aligned with the boundary between the plug and the bible (the upper part containing the pins and springs), the plug (yellow) can rotate freely.

The pin tumbler is commonly used in cylinder locks. In this type of lock, an outer casing has a cylindrical hole in which the plug is housed. To open the lock, the plug must rotate.

The plug has a straight-shaped slot known as the keyway at one end to allow the key to enter the plug; the other end may have a cam or lever, which activates a mechanism to retract a locking bolt. The keyway often has protruding ledges that serve to prevent the key pins from falling into the plug, and to make the lock more resistant to picking. A series of holes, typically five or six of them, are drilled vertically into the plug. These holes contain key pins of various lengths, which are rounded to permit the key to slide over them easily.

When an incorrect key is inserted into the lock, the key pins and driver pins do not align with the boundary between the plug and the bible, preventing the plug from rotating.

Some insecure pin tumbler lock models can be opened by pushing all pins above the boundary between the plug and the bible with a comb pick tool. Some more secure models prevent this attack by limiting the space available within the lock.

A top of the keyway tension wrench has been inserted to apply torque to the lock plug. Pins 1 and 3 have been successfully picked. Pin number 4 has been overset by the picker and will prevent the lock from opening unless it is reset by the picker. Pin 2 is in its natural resting position and remains unpicked. The picker is currently manipulating pin 5 with a lock pick.

Above each key pin is one or more spring-loaded driver pins. Simple locks typically have only one driver pin for each key pin, but locks requiring multi-keyed entry, such as a group of locks having a master key, may have extra driver pins known as spacer pins. The outer casing has several vertical shafts, which hold the spring-loaded pins.

When the plug and outer casing are assembled, the pins are pushed down into the plug by the springs. The point where the plug and cylinder meet is called the shear point. With a key properly cut and inserted into the groove on the end of the plug, the pins will rise causing them to align exactly at the shear point. This allows the plug to rotate, thus opening the lock. When the key is not in the lock, the pins straddle the shear point, preventing the plug from rotating.

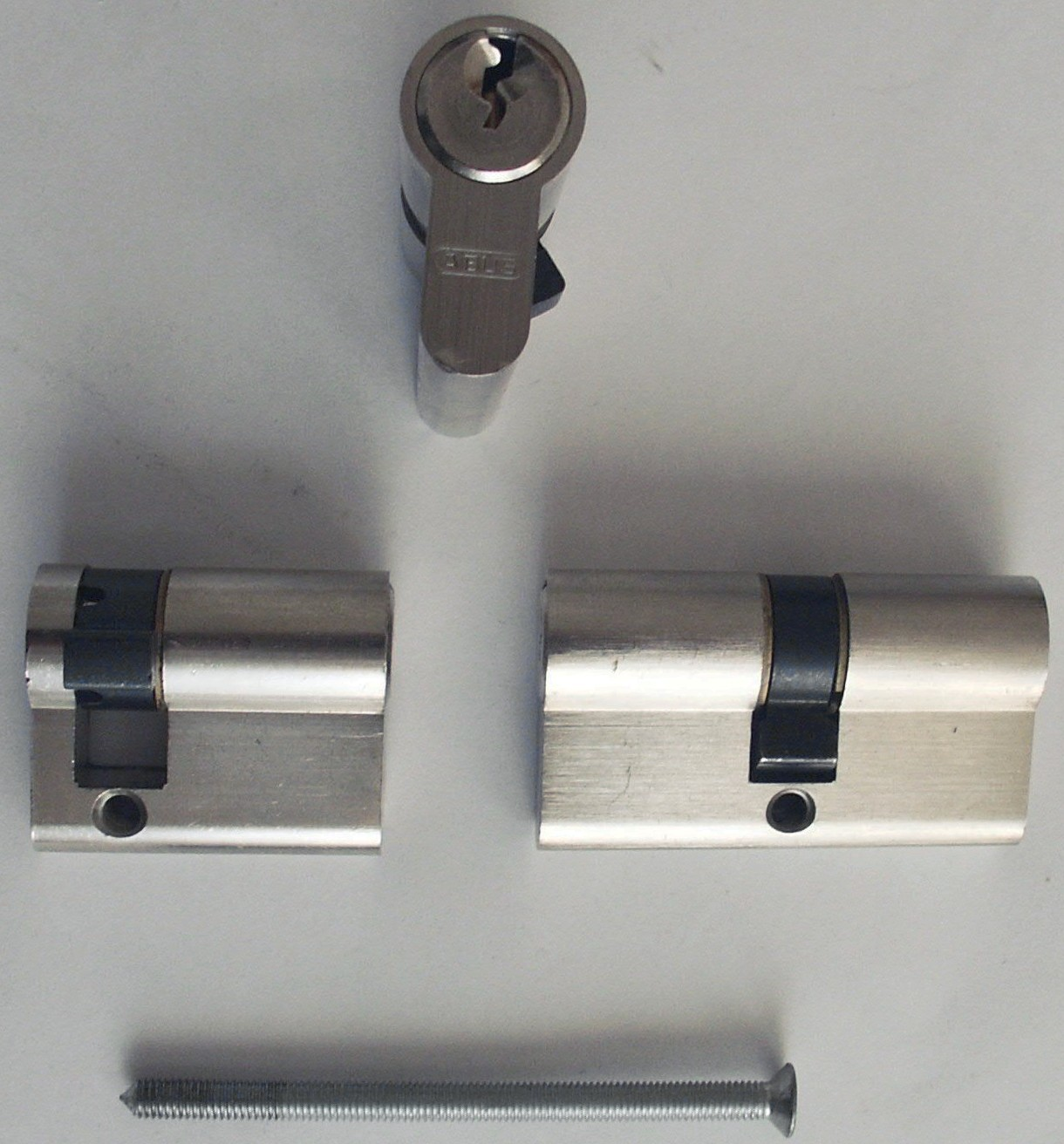
Euro profile locks, an example of a cylinder lock. These are commonly found on uPVC doors and commercial buildings where re-keying doors is common.

Commonly pin tumbler locks are found in a cylinder that can be easily unscrewed by a locksmith to facilitate rekeying. The first main advantage to such a lock, also known as a profile cylinder lock or euro, is that the cylinder can be changed without altering the boltwork hardware. Removing the cylinder typically requires only loosening a set screw, then sliding the cylinder from the boltwork. The second is that it is usually possible to obtain, from various lock manufacturers, cylinders in different formats that can all be used with the same type of key. This allows the user to have keyed-alike, and master-keyed systems that incorporate a wide variety of different types of lock, such as nightlatches, deadbolts and roller door locks.

Typically, commercial padlocks can also be included, although these rarely have removable cylinders. Standardised types of cylinder include:

- Rim-mounted (also known as night latch) cylinders
- Euro cylinders
- Key-in-knobset cylinders
- Ingersoll-format cylinders
- American, and Scandinavian round mortise cylinders
- Scandinavian oval cylinders

There are also standardised cross-sectional profiles for lock cylinders that may vary in length - for example to suit different door thicknesses. These profiles include the europrofile (or DIN standard), the British oval profile and the Swiss profile.

== Other varieties ==
A tubular pin tumbler lock is a pin-tumbler lock with a round keyway.

A dimple lock is a pin tumbler lock where the bitting is located on the side of the key, rather than the top.

== Master keying ==
A master-keyed lock is a variation of the pin tumbler lock that allows the lock to be opened with two (or more) different keys. This type is often used for doorlocks in commercial buildings with multiple tenants, such as office buildings, hotels, student accommodation and storage facilities. Each tenant is given a key that only unlocks their own door, called the change key, but the second key is the master key, which unlocks all the doors, and is usually kept by the building manager, so they can enter any room in the building.

In a master-keyed lock, some or all of the pin chambers in the lock have three pins in them instead of two. Between the driver pin and the key pin is a third pin called the spacer pin, also known as a master wafer. Thus each pin line has two shear points, one where the driver and spacer pins meet, and one where the spacer and key pins meet. So the lock will open with two keys; one aligns the first set of shear points and the other aligns the second set of shear points. The locks are manufactured so one set of shear points is unique to each lock, while the second set is identical in all the locks. A downside of a lock configured in this way is that it may be easier to pick, because a pin stack with more shear points offers more chances for a picking attack to succeed. A more secure type of mechanism has two separate tumblers, each opened by one key.

More complicated master-key lock systems are also made, with two or more levels of master keying, so there can be subordinate master keys that open only certain subsets of the locks, and a top-level master key that opens all the locks.

== Vulnerabilities ==
The basic pin tumbler lock alone is vulnerable to several lock picking methods. The most straightforward include lock bumping and snap guns. To combat this, many higher security cylinders incorporate the use of a variety of specialised pins, collectively known as security pins, that are designed to catch in the lock cylinder if a snap gun or bump key is used. Some types of security pin are spool pins that have a narrow machined waist, so called because they resemble a cotton spool, and serrated pins which are driver and/or key pins that have one or more narrow grooves cut into them, known as serrations. Both these pin modifications can give an inexperienced or opportunist lock picker the illusion of progress by causing the lock core to partially rotate or emit extra clicks. These may make the pin appear to be set when in fact it is still blocking the shear line and preventing the lock from opening. These and other security pin designs can add delay (increasing the chance of being apprehended) and, by adding complexity, may deter an attacker who does not know how to defeat these countermeasures. Generally speaking, an attack by a sufficiently experienced picker may eventually succeed. Some security pins as well as different spring designs can also make a bumping attack less likely to succeed, though this may depend on factors such as the degree of variation in bitting height between adjacent cuts in the operating key.

Lock snapping is a method of forced entry that certain types of cylinder locks are vulnerable to. Lock snapping involves applying a strong torque force to the lock cylinder, usually with a pair of locking pliers, thereby breaking the mechanism and allowing access to the latch. It can take between 50 seconds and 2 minutes to snap the lock and gain entry. Police in the UK have estimated that around 22 million doors throughout the country could be at risk from lock snapping.

Lock snapping is possible when the lock has a weakness where the retaining bolt passes through a thinner part of the lock. A recent development is to build a lock with a front section that snaps off the main body, leaving enough of the mechanism behind to prevent access to the operating latch. Some designs feature more than one sacrificial section which can stop the door from being opened from the attacked side (even with the key) while allowing the door to be opened from the other side.

Criminals utilise a small blow torch to target the area of uPVC or composite material surrounding the euro lock and door handle. The reason for this is to create a hole deep enough to reach deep into the door concentrating on the euro lock area. The goal once having created the hole is to reach with mole grips deep past any sacrificial lines of an inferior euro cylinder lock. The weak point of any euro lock is the centre screw hole which essentially holds the lock in place but also above this centre screw hole is the euro locks cam switch which is the switch that locks and unlocks the door. Once past the initial sacrificial lines of the euro lock, the burglar applies pressure to the screw hole area located in the centre of the cylinder lock, which then breaks easily as per a standard lock snapping method.

Cylinders that meet either Sold Secure SS312 Diamond or TS007 3 Star standard will protect against drilling, picking, bumping, snapping, and plug extraction methods of attack. When fitting uprated cylinder door locks it is advisable to make sure they are paired with an effective security door furniture (handle).

== See also ==
- Key relevance
- Magnetic-coded lock
- Wafer tumbler lock
