= Key code =

Encoding of key cuts

A key code is a series of alphanumeric characters used by locksmiths to create a key. There are two kinds of key codes: blind codes and bitting codes.

== Blind codes ==
These are codes that require a chart or computer program to translate the blind code to a bitting code, which is used to create the actual key. Most key codes are blind codes, and publication of code books or software is restricted to licensed locksmiths in most jurisdictions for security reasons. Some locksmiths also create their own blind coding systems for identifying key systems they installed, or for customer identification and authorization in high security systems. Example: 23N7 (General Motors) or X2100 (Nissan) are examples of blind codes used for automotive ignition keys.

Many computer and manually generated master keying charts also utilize blind codes for identifying individual change keys and masters within the system.

== Bitting code ==
The bitting code is the translated blind code which the locksmith actually uses to cut each blank key. Example: padlock blind code W123 translates to bitting code 25313, to which the locksmith would cut the key with his code machine by setting it to 25313.

The bitting code is used in conjunction with a key's Depth and Spacing Number to completely determine all relevant information regarding the key's geometry. Each number in the bitting code corresponds to a cut on the key blade. For example, a bitting code of 11111 with Depth and Spacing Number 46 specifies a Kwikset key with five shallow cuts. Conversely, a bitting code of 77777 and Depth with Spacing Number 46 specifies a Kwikset key with five deep cuts.

Experienced locksmiths might be able to figure out a bitting code from looking at a picture of a key. This happened to Diebold voting machines in 2007 after they posted a picture of their master key online, people were able to make their own key to match it and open the machines.
