= Wafer tumbler lock =

Type of Lock mechanism using flat wafers that spring upward when correct key inserted

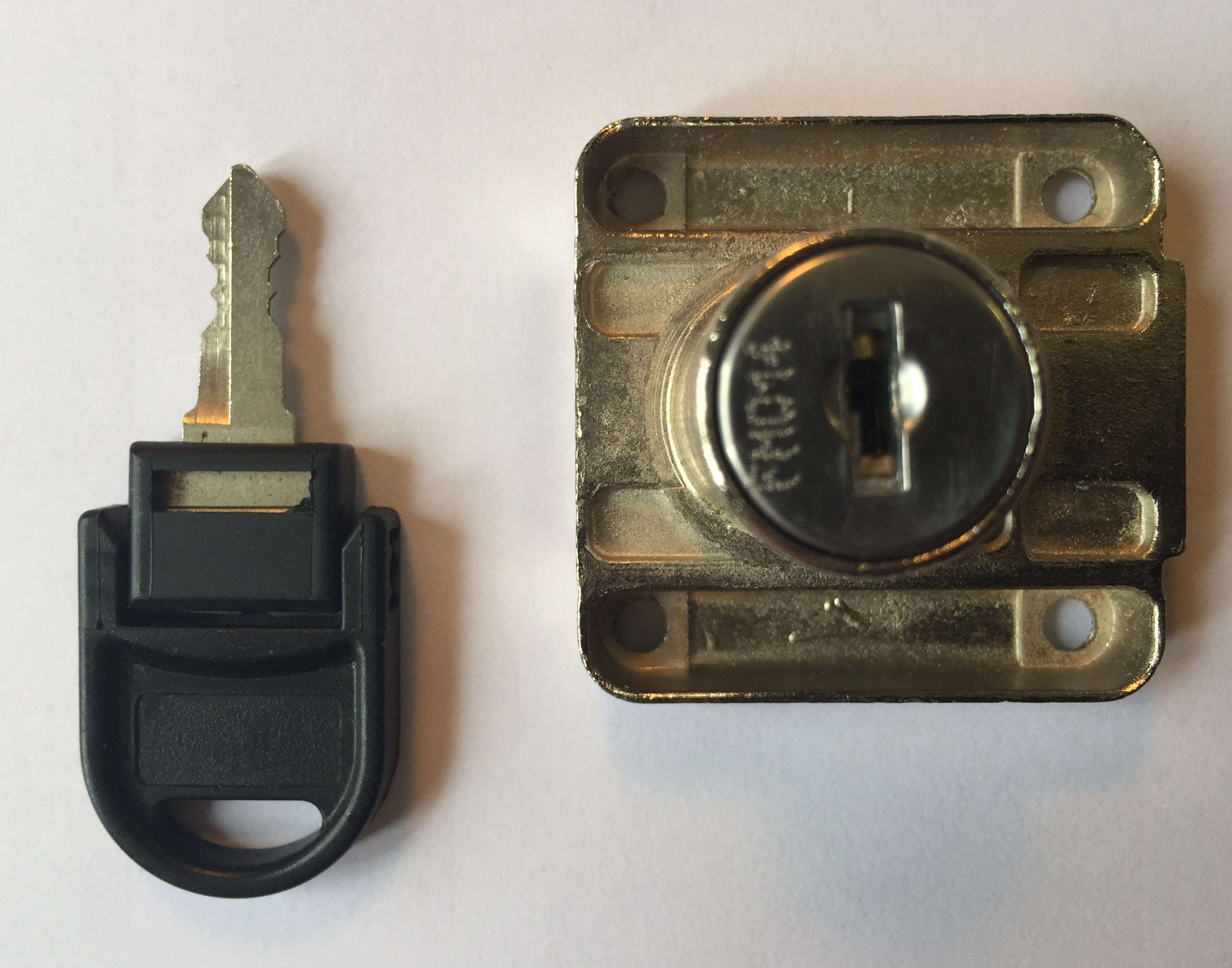
A common type of wafer tumbler lock, usually found on desk drawers, office cabinets, lockers and electrical panels

A wafer tumbler lock is a type of lock that uses a set of flat wafers to prevent the lock from opening unless the correct key is inserted. This type of lock is similar to the pin tumbler lock and works on a similar principle. However, unlike the pin tumbler lock, where each pin consists of two or more pieces, each wafer in the lock is a single piece. The wafer tumbler lock is often incorrectly referred to as a disc tumbler lock, which uses an entirely different mechanism.

== Early development ==
The earliest record of the wafer tumbler lock in the United States is a patent from 1868 by Philo Felter. Manufactured in Cazenovia, New York, it used a flat double-bitted key. Felter's lock was patented only three years after Linus Yale, Jr. received a patent for his revolutionary pin tumbler mortise lock, considered to be the first pin tumbler lock of the modern era. That lock featured a flat steel key, referred to as a "feather key" because of the marked contrast with the heavy bit keys of the day. Just two years later, Hiram S. Shepardson produced a different type of wafer tumbler lock, which used a single-bitted flat steel key, similar to Yale's feather key.

By 1878, Yale Lock had purchased Shepardson's company, The United States Lock Company, as well as Felter's American Lock Manufacturing Company. For the next 35 years, production of wafer tumbler locks languished in the U. S. And while Felter and Shepardson had designed their wafer tumbler locks for a variety of applications such as drawer and desk locks as well as padlocks and door locks, the wafer tumbler locks made during this era were mainly used for doors in mortise locks and night-latches.

Emil Christoph developed a wafer tumbler lock in 1913 which used a double-bitted key. His patent was assigned to King Lock of Chicago, a new lock manufacturer. By 1915 Briggs & Stratton Corporation was using King wafer tumbler locks in their ignition switches. In 1919, Briggs & Stratton applied for a switch patent using a wafer tumbler lock of their own design, which used a double-bitted key. Five years later, Edward N. Jacobi of Briggs & Stratton filed for a patent for a five-wafer, single-bitted wafer tumbler lock. The first recorded use of this lock was for an automobile, the 1924 Hupp Eight.

In the UK, this type of lock was introduced by Josiah Parkes & Sons of Willenhall in 1929, who supplied them initially to the Wilmot Breeden company. Early units were stamped with a patent number on the keys, although it is not clear whether this referred to a U.S. patent or one taken out by JPS themselves. Wilmot Breeden combined leaf-tumbler barrels with parallel innovations in pressure diecasting and chromium-plating and thus became the major manufacture of vehicle body hardware in the UK nearly fifty years, supplying all of the country's vehicle manufacturers apart from Rolls-Royce and Bentley who remained with pin-tumbler designs. Early WB key-types were branded 'MRA', 'NAX', and 'MRN', the latter being used universally until 1945. British competitors copied WB patterns, even duplicating the exact cut of their keys, necessitating changes to 'FA', 'FP', and 'FS', each having some variation in fluting, or key-section. All these barrels used single-sided keys until a 'double-entry' pattern was developed for Ford in 1962, and this quickly became the standard with motor manufacturers until the advent of higher-security barrels in 1968. The first of these was 'NH', with ten tumblers arranged five per side, which was required to meet new motor industry standards for security. Subsequently WB's more advanced 'WR' series also had ten tumblers but with an asymmetrical key. Development ceased with the effective demise of WB in 1982.

== Design ==
In a cylindrical wafer tumbler lock, a series of flat wafers holds a cylindrical plug in place. The wafers are fitted into vertical slots in the plug, and are spring-loaded, causing them to protrude into diametrically opposed wide grooves in the outer casing of the lock. As long as any of the wafers protrude into one of the wide grooves, rotation of the plug is blocked, as would be the case if there was no key, or if an improperly bitted key were inserted.

A rectangular hole is cut into the center of each wafer; the vertical position of the holes in the wafers vary, so a key must have notches corresponding to the height of the hole in each wafer, so that each wafer is pulled in to the point where the wafer edges are flush with the plug, clearing the way for the plug to rotate in order to open the lock. If any wafer is insufficiently raised, or raised too high, the wafer edge will be in one of the grooves, blocking rotation.

Mechanism

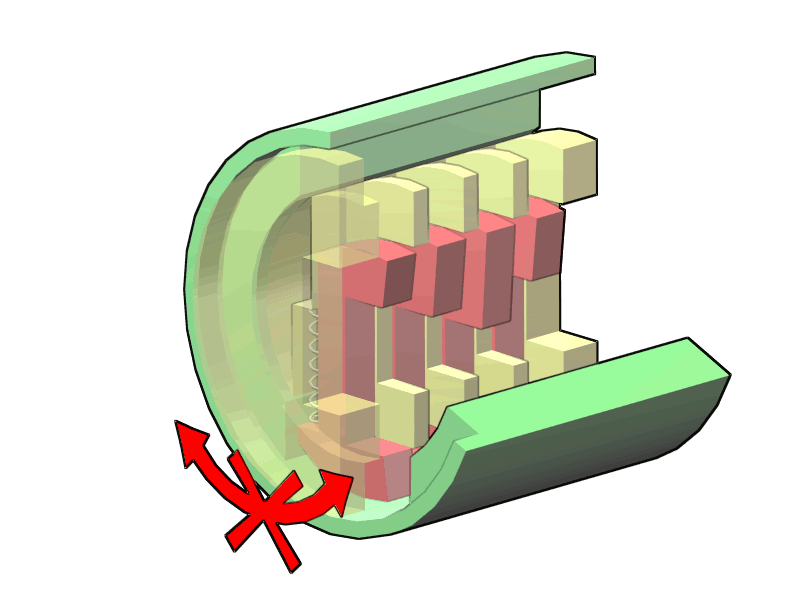
Without a key in the lock, the wafers (red) are pushed down by springs. The wafers nestle into a groove in the lower part of the outer cylinder (green) preventing the plug (yellow) from rotating.

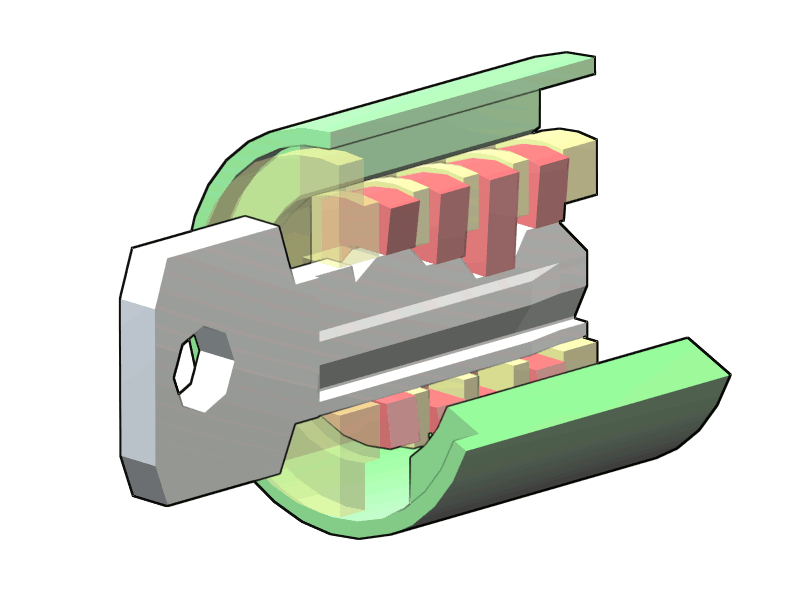
When the correct key is inserted, the wafers (red) are raised up out of the lower groove in the outer cylinder, but not so high that they enter the upper groove in that cylinder.

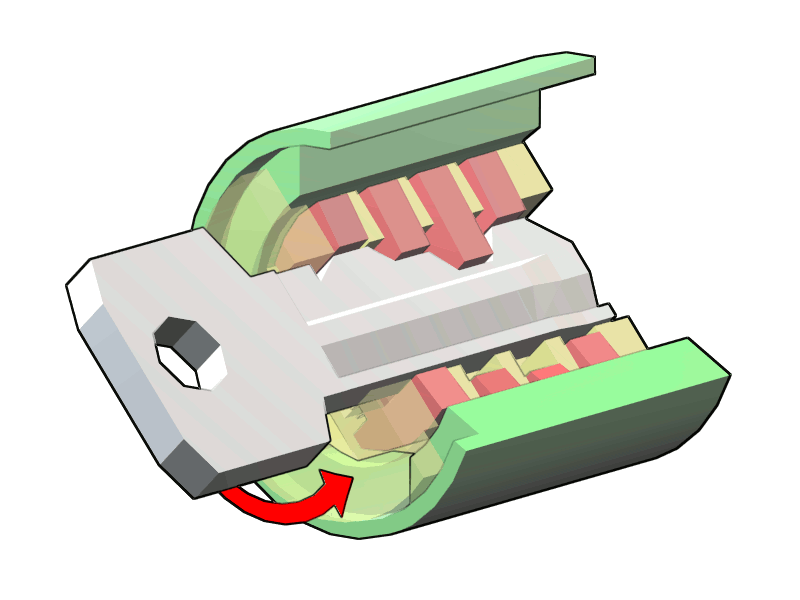
With the wafers unobstructed, the key, wafers, and plug (yellow) can rotate.

== Types and wafer arrangements ==
Wafer tumbler lock configurations vary with manufacturer. The most common is the single-bitted, five-wafer configuration most commonly found on desk drawers, cabinets, key switches, lockers, cash boxes and electrical panels.

Some wafer tumbler locks use a stack of closely spaced wafers designed to fit a specific contour of a double-sided key and work on the principle of a carpenter's contour gauge.

Wafer tumbler locks can use single-bitted or double-bitted keys. Though wafer arrangements within the plug may vary, such as automotive locks, where the wafers are arranged in opposed sets, requiring a double-bitted key, the operating principle remains the same.

=== Crushable wafer tumbler lock ===
At one time, several manufacturers made a "crushable wafer tumbler" for these locks, the idea being to simplify the task of rekeying for locksmiths and reduce the number of different wafers that needed to be manufactured and stocked. To rekey such a lock, the locksmith simply replaced all the wafers with identical "crushable wafers", cut the new key, inserted the key into the plug, inserted the plug into a special "crushing" tool, and squeezed the handle of the tool, crushing the wafers to fit the key. It was quick and easy but had reliability problems: debris from the crushed wafers often remained in the plug causing wear and occasional jamming of wafers or the plug, and sometimes wafers crushed unevenly making them weak and causing them to break later in use. This system was eventually abandoned.

== Vulnerabilities ==
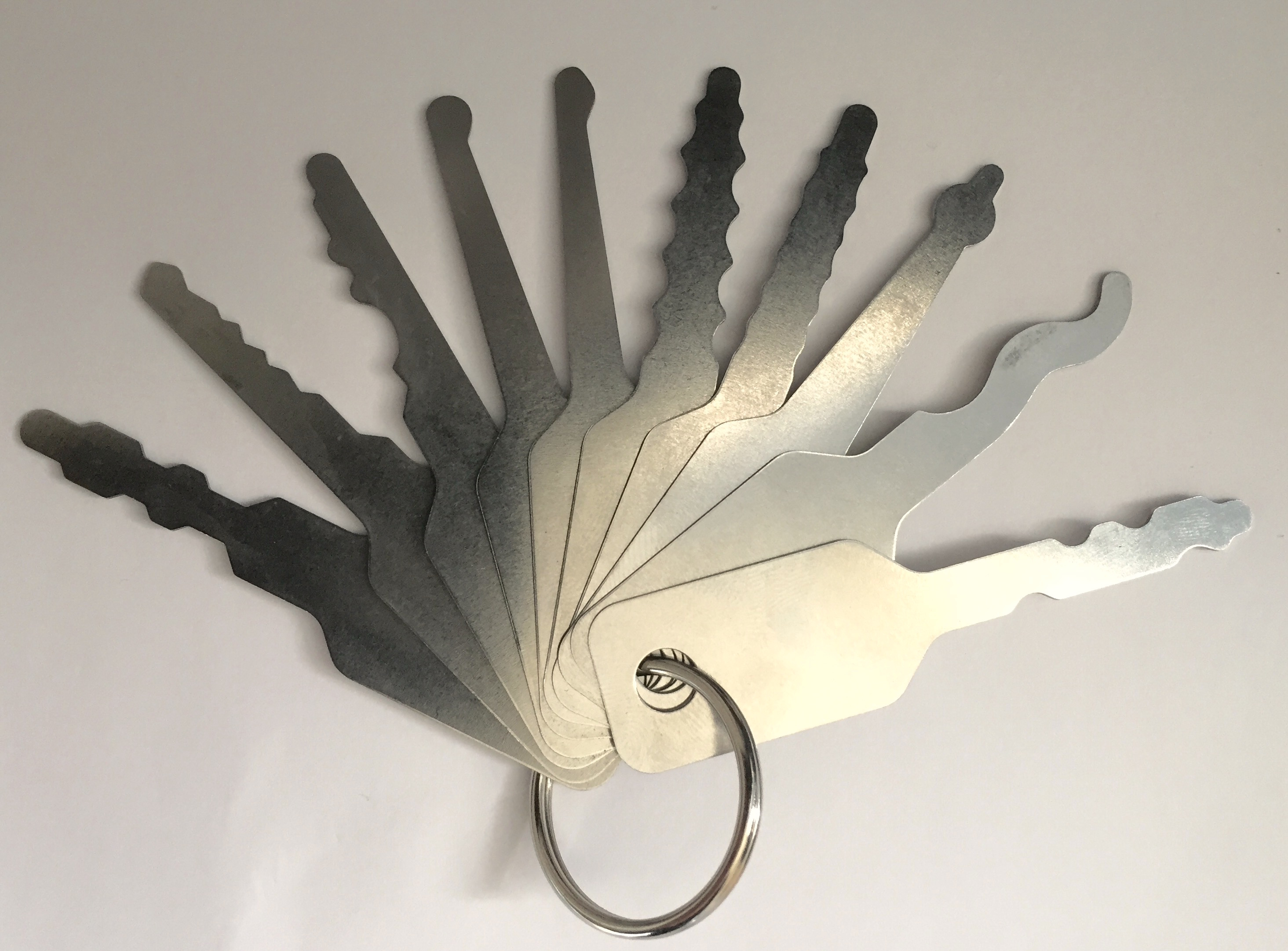
A set of try-out keys, or jigglers, which can be used to open most types of wafer tumbler lock

Most wafer tumbler locks with poor tolerances can be opened with a set of jigglers or try-out keys. These sets of keys are designed with the most common patterns of key available. The key is inserted into the lock like a normal key, and a turning force is applied whilst the key is raked back and forth and/or jiggled up and down until the lock opens.
