= The National Locksmith =

American trade magazine

The National Locksmith (ISSN 0364-3719), first published in 1929, is a magazine dedicated to the locksmithing industry by the National Publishing Co. of Streamwood.
