= Tennessee Department of Commerce and Insurance =

Government agency in Tennessee

Agency overview
- Headquarters: Davy Crockett Tower; 500 James Robertson Parkway; Nashville, Tennessee, United States
- Agency executive: Commissioner
- Website: www.tn.gov/commerce

The Tennessee Department of Commerce and Insurance (TDCI) is a state Cabinet agency of the government of Tennessee. The main job of the agency is to regulate and license various businesses and industries within the state.

== Operations ==
The TDCI is organized into the following divisions:

- Consumer Insurance Services: Responsible for educating consumers about insurance and resolving insurance-related conflicts.
- Insurance: Responsible for enforcing the state's insurance laws.
- Regulatory Boards: Responsible for regulating and licensing many different businesses and professions.
- Securities: Responsible for enforcing laws and regulations related to securities.
- Fire Prevention: Responsible for administering fire prevention and protection programs throughout the state.
- TennCare Oversight: Responsible for regulating and monitoring TennCare, the state's Medicaid program.
