= Glossary of locksmithing terms =

This is a glossary of locksmithing terms.

== Glossary ==
Bible
The bible is the part of a pin tumbler lock that contains the pins and pin stack springs as well as the pin stacks themselves. The driver pins of a pin-tumbler lock are located in the bible.
Bit
The section of a key which enters a lock, which has the key cuts formed in it and which engages the bolt or tumblers of the lock. The bit is called a blade in the case of a cylinder key.
Bitting
The bitting of a key is the physical arrangement of the bit of the key that engage with the locking mechanism. The bitting instructs a locksmith how to cut a certain key, to replace a lost key or make an additional copy.
Blade
The segment of a key which enters the keyway of a lock and has key cuts machined into it. On a bit key the blade is called a bit.
Bolt stump
In lever tumbler locks, a bolt stump is a rectangular part located above the talon, and passes through the slot in the levers as the bolt moves.
Bottom pin
See key pin.
Break
A break in the pins is a separation in one or more sections of the pin used to encode the lock for a specific key or set of keys in a master keying system.
Driver pin
In a pin tumbler lock, the driver pin is in contact with the spring and interferes with the rotation of the plug when no key is inserted. When the pins are above the plug, the driver pin is also known as the top pin.
Dual custody
A dual custody locking system is one where two different keys, generally given to different people, are required to open the lock. These are often used in safe deposit boxes.
Face plate
A metal plate on the lockset itself (on the door, not the jamb) is called a face plate.
False gate
A false gate is a mechanical element on levers in lever tumbler locks or discs in disc tumbler locks to make the lock more difficult to pick.
Glass relocking device
A glass relocking device is a piece of glass, usually tempered, placed where it might be expected to break in a burglary attack. It is attached, usually with wires, to one or more spring-loaded bolts, which are often randomly located. A drill or torch may break the glass, releasing the bolts.
Key cut
A square, rounded or V-shaped depression, filed or machined into a key, to allow the key to turn in its lock. In pin tumbler locks, the series of key cuts on a key causes the pins to line up at the shear line or gate so the lock will open. In warded locks, the key cuts bypass the wards so the key can push or pull the bolt.
Key pin
In a pin tumbler lock, the key pin is in contact with the key. It has varying lengths, corresponding to the key's bitting cuts. When the pins are above the plug, the key pin is also known as the bottom pin.
Lock housing
The lock housing is the part of the lock that does not move when the lock is opened. It is responsible for transferring the action of the key to the bolt.
Master pin
In a pin tumbler lock, a master pin is an optional, usually short, disk-like pin placed between the top and bottom pins. Its purpose is to allow two differently-cut keys to open the lock. Master pins are also called master wafers.
Plug
The plug is the part of a cylinder lock which is designed to turn when a key is inserted.
Plug follower
A plug follower is a device used in the assembly and disassembly of locks; it is a solid cylinder that is used to push the plug out of the lock, while preventing the springs and driver pins from moving.

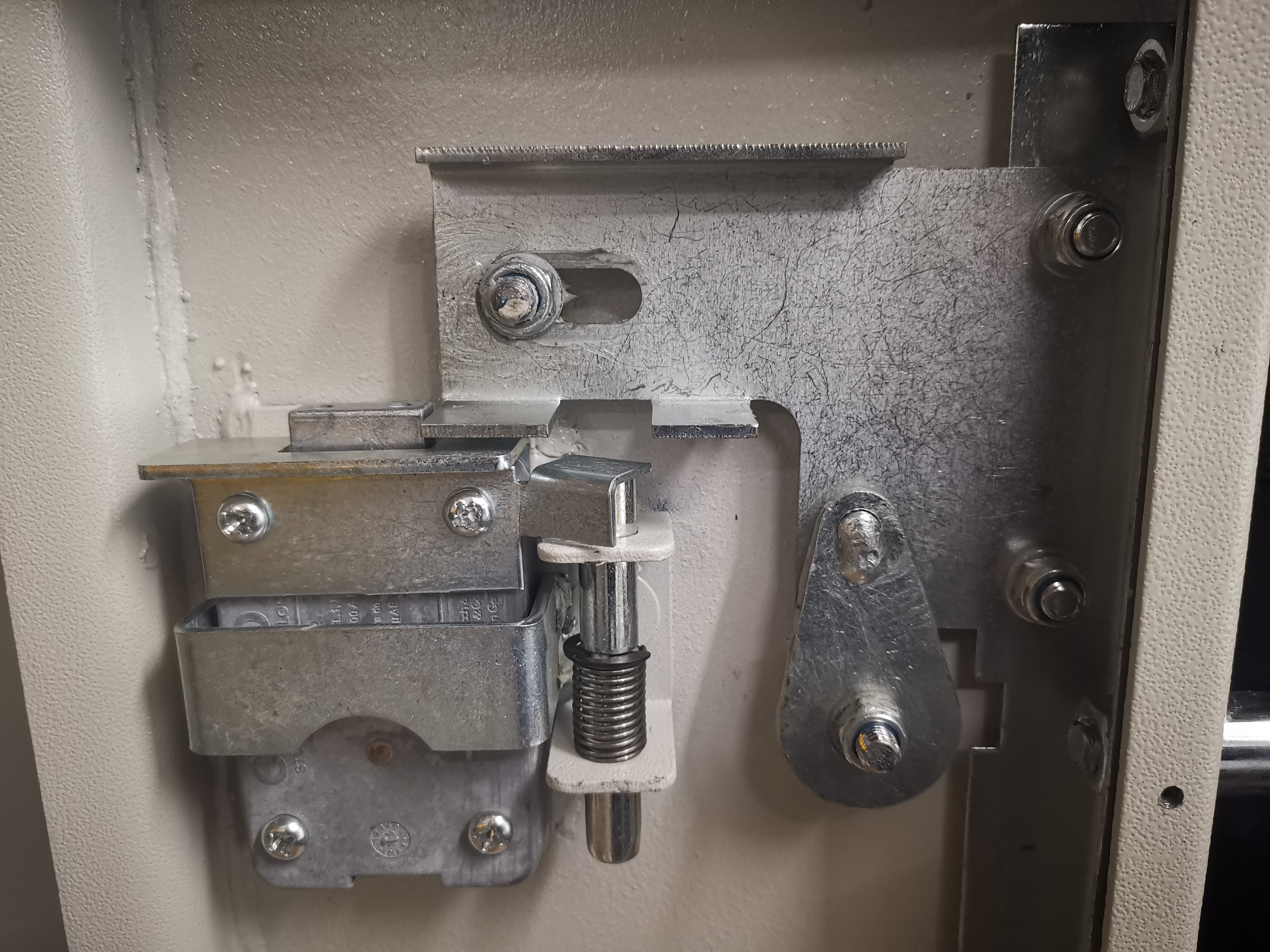
Relocking device in a safe

Relocking device
A relocking device (RLD) (a.k.a. "external relocker") is an auxiliary locking device intended to be activated during an attempted burglary of a safe or vault. Such a device will keep a safe or vault locked even if the primary lock is defeated. This independent mechanism is designed to maintain the locked state of a safe even if the lock itself is destroyed. This auxiliary locking device usually consists of a spring-loaded bolt of some type, held in check by a bracket or cable that is rigged to release the mechanism in a burglary attempt. The device will either block the main boltwork from retracting or block the door from opening. Glass relockers are one of the most common types of relockers used in today's safes. Relockers are typically designed for one-time activation, meaning that once they are triggered the device is locked "permanently" and can only be opened by brute force.
Security pin
A security pin is a pin designed in a non-standard way to make picking the lock more difficult. Examples of security pins include serrated pins, spools, and mushroom pins.
Shear line
In a cylinder lock, the shear line (also known as the split line in Australia), is where the inner cylinder (plug) ends and the outer cylinder begins. When a break in the pin is reached by picking, the pin will "hang" at the shearline due to the space between the inner and outer cylinder. This "imperfection" in the lock mechanism is an unavoidable defect in the manufacturing process that allows for lock picking.
Snib
A snib is a device to engage or disengage a lock without the use of a key. In Scottish English or Irish English, the word is sometimes used as a synonym for lock.
Spool pin
A spool pin is a type of security pin used to prevent picking in a pin tumbler lock. The pin is shaped like a cable reel.
Strike plate
A strike plate is a metal plate affixed to a doorjamb with a hole or holes for the bolt of the door. When the door is closed, the bolt extends into the hole in the strike plate and holds the door closed. The strike plate protects the jamb against friction from the bolt and increases security in the case of a jamb made of a softer material (such as wood) than the strike plate. Some strike plates have their hole size and placement calculated so a spring-bolt extends into the hole, but an adjacent anti-retraction device remains depressed, preventing the bolt from being retracted unless the lock is turned.
Talon
The part of the bolt of a lock upon which the key presses as it is turned.
Thermal relocking device
Designed as a defense against torch attacks, these are simply relocking devices equipped with a fusible link designed to melt and release the relocking device if the temperature inside the door exceeds a certain temperature (usually 65 °C), as would happen in a torch attack.
Top pin
See driver pin.
Warding
The grooves and protrusions of an irregularly shaped keyhole and/or the internal passage of a lock that requires a key be of a certain shape to be inserted.
