= Bitting (key) =

Depth of key cuts on a cylinder key for a pin tumbler lock

A bit key with its main parts labelled

Bitting is the depth of key cuts on a cylinder key for a pin tumbler lock, often expressed as a number. Bitting also refers to the combination of key cuts on a bit key for a warded lock or lever tumbler lock.

The exact geometry of modern keys is usually described by a code system. The bitting instructs a locksmith how to cut a certain key, to replace a lost key or make an additional copy.

The bitting is usually a series of integers (e.g. 372164) that is usually translated from a key code chart or from a bitting code list to settings on specially designed key machines. In many code systems each digit in the bitting corresponds to a certain location on the key blank where a cut or notch is to be made and also indicates the necessary depth of the cut.

Many lock companies use their own proprietary code system. Depending on the maker, the bitting sequence can be from bow-to-tip (the bow being the larger, handle portion of the key), or can be from tip-to-bow. A smaller number is typically a shallower cut on the key, but not always. Assa bitting codes are reversed, where the higher the digit, the shallower the cut. One American manufacturer, Eagle Lock Company, used letters exclusively for bitting codes.

== Angularly bitted ==
This is a type of key where the individual cuts are designed to engage chisel-pointed pins in high-security locking systems manufactured by Medeco and Emhart. These angled cuts are designed to lift each tumbler to a predetermined height to the shear line and to rotate them to a specific angle to engage a sidebar mechanism (Medeco) (this is also used in Schlage Primus) or to line up an interlocked pin to such a position to where it would allow the plug to rotate (Emhart).

== See also ==
- Keys by code
- Warded lock
