= Locksmithing =

Science and art of making and defeating locks

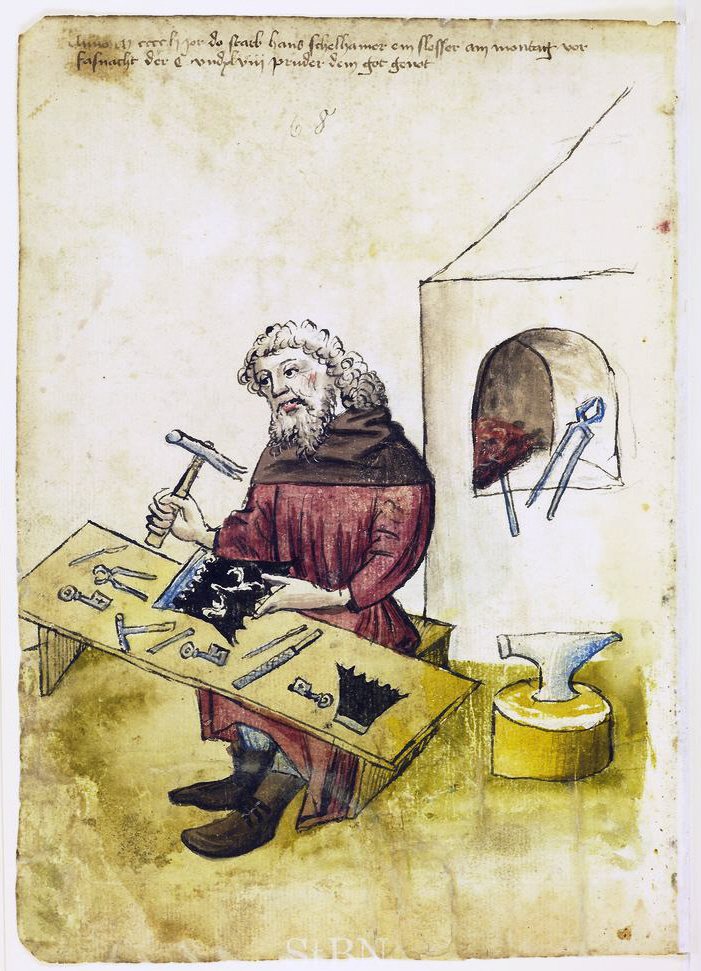
An illustration of a German locksmith, 1451.

Locksmithing is the work of creating and bypassing locks. Locksmithing is a traditional trade and in many countries requires completion of an apprenticeship. The level of formal education legally required varies by country, ranging from no formal education to a training certificate awarded by an employer, or a full diploma from an engineering college, along with time spent as an apprentice.

== Terminology ==
A lock is a mechanism that secures buildings, rooms, cabinets, objects, or other storage facilities. A "smith" is a metalworker who shapes metal pieces, often using a forge or mould, into useful objects or to be part of a more complex structure. Thus locksmithing, as its name implies, is the assembly and designing of locks and their respective keys by hand. Most locksmiths use both automatic and manual cutting tools to mold keys, with many of these tools being powered by batteries or mains electricity.

== Work ==
Locks have been constructed for over 2,500 years, initially out of wood and later out of metal. Historically, locksmiths would make the entire lock, working for hours hand cutting screws and doing much file-work. Lock designs became significantly more complicated in the 18th century, and locksmiths often specialized in repairing or designing locks.

Although replacing lost keys for automobiles and homes, as well as rekeying locks for security purposes, remains an important part of locksmithing, a 1976 U.S. Government publication noted that modern locksmiths are primarily involved in installing high-quality lock-sets and managing keying and key control systems.

=== Locksmith specialisations ===
Most locksmiths also provide electronic lock services, such as programming smart keys for transponder-equipped vehicles and implementing access control systems to protect individuals and assets for large institutions. Many also specialise in other areas such as:

- Auto Locksmithing
- Safes

== Regulation by country ==
=== Australia ===
In Australia, prospective locksmiths are required to take a Technical and Further Education (TAFE) course in locksmithing, completion of which leads to issuance of a Level 3 Australian Qualifications Framework certificate, and complete an apprenticeship. They must also pass a criminal records check certifying that they are not currently wanted by the police. Apprenticeships can last one to four years. Course requirements are variable: there is a minimal requirements version that requires fewer total training units, and a fuller version that teaches more advanced skills, but takes more time to complete. Apprenticeship and course availability vary by state or territory.

=== Ireland ===
In Ireland, licensing for locksmiths was introduced in 2016, with locksmiths having to obtain a Private Security Authority license. The Irish Locksmith Organisation has 50 members with ongoing training to ensure all members are up-to-date with knowledge and skills.

=== United Kingdom ===
In the UK, there is no current government regulation for locksmithing, so effectively anyone can trade and operate as a locksmith with no skill or knowledge of the industry.

=== United States ===
Fifteen states in the United States require licensure for locksmiths. Nassau County and New York City in New York State, and Hillsborough County and Miami-Dade County in Florida have their own licensing laws. State and local laws are described in the table below. 15 states require locksmith licensing: Alabama, California, Connecticut, Illinois, Louisiana, Maryland, Nebraska, New Jersey, Nevada, North Carolina, Oklahoma, Oregon, Tennessee, Texas and Virginia.

US Locksmith Licensing
State	Regulatory body	Requirements
Alabama	Alabama Electronic Security Board of Licensure	Certification course, continuing education, background check every two years
California	California Department of Consumer Affairs, California Contractors State License Board; California Bureau of Security and Investigative Services	California requires a C-28 Lock and Security Equipment Contractor license, with renewal every two years, in addition to a background check.
Connecticut	Department of Consumer Protection	Background check, registration (renews biennially)
Florida	No statewide regulation. Counties of Hillsborough and Miami-Dade require licensure for locksmiths and locksmith firms. Miami-Dade's ordinance covers locksmithing, as well as the installation of security alarm closed-circuit television systems.	Miami-Dade: must register with county and receive license. Each business performing locksmith services must have at least one license-holder in its employ. Fingerprinting and criminal background check accompany license application. Initial applicants must have a locksmith permit for one year before full licensure. Any work involving electrical systems must be done by someone who also holds a state electrician's or contractor's license. Hillsborough: must apply for a biennial locksmith license. The cost is $500 for an individual or firm of up to five employees, $750 for a firm of six to ten employees, and $1,000 for a firm of more than ten employees. A background check and proof of insurance are also required.Pinellas County: The City of Clearwater requires fingerprints applied by Clearwater police.
Illinois	Illinois Department of Financial and Professional Regulation	Must not have been convicted of a felony in the last ten years, must take twenty-hour licensure course, must pass examination
Louisiana	Louisiana Office of State Fire Marshall	Must pass examination, pay initial registration of $250, and maintain registration for $50 annually thereafter. Additional training and certification are required for locksmiths dealing with locks on fire and safety equipment and alarm systems.
Maryland	Maryland Locksmith Licensing Program, Maryland Department of Labor	Must apply for a license and submit to a criminal records check, and after issue, must carry a state-issued locksmith license card at all times when performing work. Prior felony and misdemeanor convictions will be weighed by the Secretary of Labor according to statutorily-determined factors, including length of time since the offense and applicant's behavior since, when deciding to grant or withhold a license. The licensee must carry liability insurance, and submit proof of insurance to the secretary.
Nebraska	County Clerk	Registration with the county clerk in the county in which the locksmith's business is located
Nevada	County Sheriff	Must not be in arrears on child support, and must register with the county sheriff of the county in which the business is located
New Jersey	New Jersey Board of Examiners of Electrical Contractors	Must be at least eighteen years of age, must complete three years of supervised locksmith work, working an average of at least twenty hours a week, or complete a formal two-year apprenticeship in a program approved by the United States Department of Labor, must not have been convicted of certain crimes within a ten-year period prior to application, and must pass an examination before being granted license.
New York	No statewide licensing requirement. In Nassau County, a county license is required.	Nassau County requirements include submission of passport-style photos for photo identification license card for the principal applicant; business or home address and phone number and proof of number operability in the form of a recent telephone bill; a listing of all employees and officers of the company along with passport photos; recent utility bill for the business location if the business is not operated from home; a statement of all criminal convictions for all employees and officers, along with court records if requested; statement all trade names used by the business, and incorporation documents, if applicable; proof of insurance; proof of workers' compensation registration; a federal employee identification number, and a state sales tax number, if applicable; and fingerprint records for all applicants, in addition to a non-refundable processing fee.
North Carolina	North Carolina Locksmith Licensing Board	Must submit documentation of criminal history. Must submit documentation of out-of-state licenses, immigration status, and military discharge, if applicable. May optionally submit training certifications and other data. Must pay an initial license fee and subsequent annual renewal fees and keep license on person at all times. Must notify state of any employees operating under the owner's locksmith license. All apprentices must be themselves licensed under an apprentice license, and may not perform certain services, except under the direct supervision of a full locksmith license holder.
Oklahoma	Alarm, Locksmith, & Fire Sprinkler Program, Oklahoma Department of Labor	Must not have been convicted of a felony and must register with Alarm, Locksmith & Fire Sprinkler Program.
Oregon	Oregon Construction Contractors Board	Must pass a criminal background check, pass a license examination, and renew registration biennially
Tennessee	Tennessee Department of Commerce and Insurance	Must provide documentation of citizenship or legal residency, any criminal convictions, all changes of address; business license in county or city where business operates, or a notarized statement that services will be for an employer or association and not offered directly to the public; otherwise, must submit documentation of application for, or employment by, a Tennessee Locksmith Company duly registered with the state. Conviction of a felony, or any level of drug, burglary, or breaking and entering offense may bar the applicant from licensure.
Texas	Department of Public Safety Private Security Board	The owner or manager of a company providing locksmith services must hold a Locksmith Company License. To qualify for a license, the applicant must have two years service as a locksmith for a licensed company. Alternatively, the applicant may substitute one year's experience plus successful completion of a forty-eight hour licensure course, followed by successful completion of a comprehensive license examination.
Virginia	Department of Criminal Justice Services	Must be over eighteen years of age. Must complete an eighteen-hour training course. Must undergo a criminal records check and submit fingerprints. Anyone convicted of a felony or misdemeanor (excluding traffic violations) in Virginia or any other jurisdiction must complete a supplemental Criminal History form detailing the circumstances of arrest and conviction, completion of sentence, and any record pertaining to parole or probation. Any false statements or omissions can provide grounds for denial of license and possible criminal sanctions.

== Employment ==
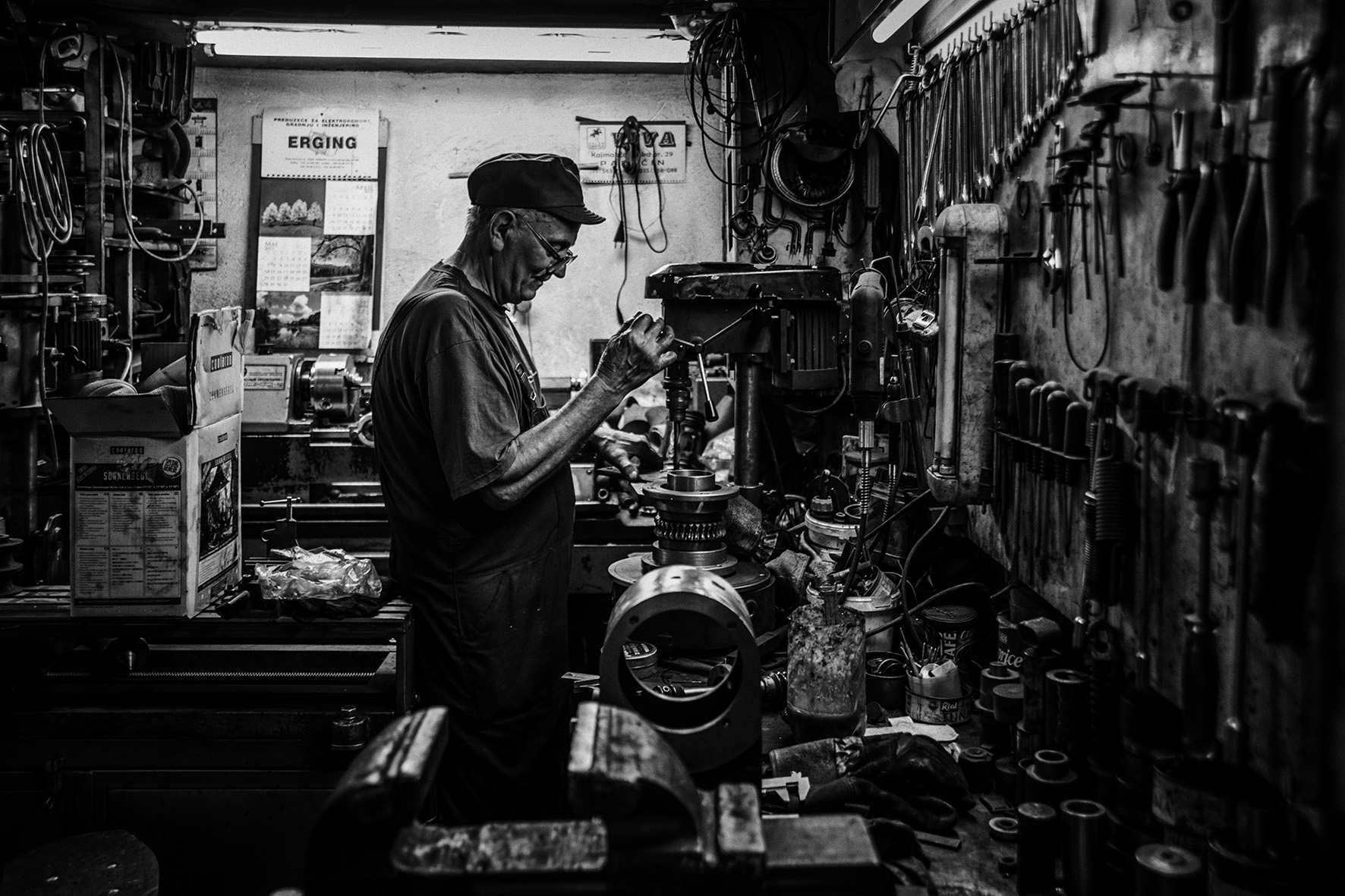
A Locksmith, 2013

Locksmiths may be commercial (working out of a storefront), mobile (working out of a vehicle), institutional (employed by an institution) or investigatory (forensic locksmiths) or may specialize in one aspect of the skill, such as an automotive lock specialist, a master key system specialist or a safe technician. Many locksmiths also work as security consultants, but not all security consultants possess locksmithing skills. Locksmiths are frequently certified in specific skill areas or to a level of skill within the trade. This is separate from certificates of completion of training courses. In determining skill levels, certifications from manufacturers or locksmith associations are usually more valid criteria than certificates of completion. Some locksmiths decide to call themselves "Master Locksmiths" whether they are fully trained or not, and some training certificates appear quite authoritative.

The majority of locksmiths also work on any existing door hardware, not just locking mechanisms. This includes door closers, door hinges, electric strikes, frame repairs and other door hardware.

== Full disclosure ==
The issue of full disclosure was first raised in the context of locksmithing, in a 19th-century controversy regarding whether weaknesses in lock systems should be kept secret in the locksmithing community, or revealed to the public.

According to A. C. Hobbs:

A commercial, and in some respects a social doubt has been started within the last year or two, whether or not it is right to discuss so openly the security or insecurity of locks. Many well-meaning persons suppose that the discussion respecting the means for baffling the supposed safety of locks offers a premium for dishonesty, by showing others how to be dishonest. This is a fallacy. Rogues are very keen in their profession, and know already much more than we can teach them respecting their several kinds of roguery.

Rogues knew a good deal about lock-picking long before locksmiths discussed it among themselves, as they have lately done. If a lock, let it have been made in whatever country, or by whatever maker, is not so inviolable as it has hitherto been deemed to be, surely it is to the interest of honest persons to know this fact, because the dishonest are tolerably certain to apply the knowledge practically; and the spread of the knowledge is necessary to give fair play to those who might suffer by ignorance.

It cannot be too earnestly urged that an acquaintance with real facts will, in the end, be better for all parties. Some time ago, when the reading public was alarmed at being told how London milk is adulterated, timid persons deprecated the exposure, on the plea that it would give instructions in the art of adulterating milk; a vain fear, milkmen knew all about it before, whether they practised it or not; and the exposure only taught purchasers the necessity of a little scrutiny and caution, leaving them to obey this necessity or not, as they pleased.

-- From A. C. Hobbs (Charles Tomlinson, ed.), Locks and Safes: The Construction of Locks. Published by Virtue & Co., London, 1853 (revised 1868).

== Notable locksmiths ==
- William F. Banham, founder of Banham Security, invented the first automatic latch bolt lock in 1926 after a series of burglaries on his wife's dress shop. He opened up his own locksmith shop on Oxford Street, London, and offered £25 to anyone who could pick or break one of his patented locks Banham Group still offer the patented locks.
- Robert Barron patented a double-acting tumbler lock in 1778, the first reasonable improvement in lock security.
- Joseph Bramah patented the Bramah lock in 1784. It was considered unpickable for 67 years, until A.C. Hobbs picked it, taking over 50 hours.
- Jeremiah Chubb patented his detector lock in 1818. It won him the reward offered by the Government for a lock that could not be opened by any, but its own key.
- James Sargent described the first successful key-changeable combination lock in 1857. His lock became popular with safe manufacturers and the United States Treasury Department. In 1873, he patented a time lock mechanism, the prototype for those used in contemporary bank vaults.
- Samuel Segal of the Segal Lock and Hardware Company invented the first jimmy-proof locks in 1916.
- Harry Soref founded the Master Lock Company in 1921 and patented an improved padlock in 1924 with a patent lock casing constructed out of laminated steel.
- Linus Yale Sr. invented a pin tumbler lock in 1848.
- Linus Yale Jr. improved upon his father's lock in 1861, using a smaller, flat key with serrated edges that is the basis of modern pin-tumbler locks. Yale Jr. developed the modern combination lock in 1862.
- Alfred Charles Hobbs demonstrated the inadequacy of several respected locks of the time in 1851 at The Great Exhibition, and popularized the practice of full disclosure.

== See also ==
- Associated Locksmiths of America
- Door security
- Glossary of locksmithing terms
- Immobiliser
- Locksport
- Master Locksmiths Association
- The National Locksmith
