= STD-4C =

Classification of cluster mailboxes in the United States

STD-4C or STANDARD-4C refers to a set of standards and regulations set by the United States Postal Service regarding the specifications of cluster mailbox units used in new construction. All multi unit constructions building plans submitted after October 6, 2006 are required to use STD-4C compliant mailboxes

== STD-4C mailboxes ==
The STD-4C is the current USPS regulation for any centralized, wall-mounted mailboxes, whether located inside an office high-rise or within a new single-family subdivision as an outdoor centralized mailbox kiosk. New STD-4C compliant mailboxes are commonly referred to as centralized mail delivery equipment.

The Postal Service modified the regulation for new construction due to changing customer mailing habits and specific mail and package volume trends. Postal Service statistics indicate customers receive more mail and of varying sizes than at the time of the last updated standard which prescribed design limitations that are no longer consistent with the operational requirements of the Postal Service. The new standard (which became mandatory in October 2006) requires mailbox receptacles with increased protection for the mail, benefiting both senders and addressees; improves the overall safety of the equipment in use; reduces maintenance costs incurred by buildings; and results in cleaner lobbies with less clutter. Finally, the newly designed receptacle is easier to access and serve by carriers, thereby helping to reduce Postal Service costs and becoming the "greenest" delivery method. Developing a new standard: The new standard was developed through a consensus process and was agreed to by a committee of representatives from mailbox manufacturers; mailbox distributors; mailbox installers and servicers; Postal Service customers; multi-unit residential and commercial property builders, owners, and managers; and the Postal Service. In addition, Domestic Mail Manual (DMMTM) standards provide manufacturers and customers with notice of the specifications.

The members of the committee met six times as an advisory group and negotiated among themselves and with the Postal Service to reach a consensus on a new standard. Committee members were selected for the purpose of, and accepted the responsibility for, representing other interested individuals and organizations that were not present at committee meetings and to keep them informed of the committee's proceedings. As part of the consensus process, the Postal Service agreed to use a recommendation by the committee as the basis of the revised standard. Standard 4C represents the committee's recommendation. With one exception, each member of the committee signed the final agreement recommending adoption of this standard. That one committee member, a builders association, though supportive of the process and generally in concurrence with the new standard, declined to sign the agreement because a provision of the adopted standard establishes a minimum ratio of parcel lockers to customer compartments. This committee member stated its concerns in a comment submitted on the proposed rule, which the Postal Service will address with the other comments received.

== Design and installation regulations ==
This new regulation, STD-4C, replaces all previous regulations (4B+, 4B, etc.) and requires STD-4C compliant mailboxes for all new construction and major renovations (defined as any change to the existing opening mailboxes are currently located in). The STD-4C installation requirements include:

- At least one customer compartment shall be positioned less than 48 inches from the finished floor.
- No parcel locker compartment (interior bottom shelf) shall be positioned less than 15 inches from the finished floor.
- No patron (tenant) lock shall be located more than 67 inches above the finished floor.
- No customer compartment (interior bottom shelf) shall be positioned less than 28 inches from the finished floor.
- The USPS Arrow lock shall be located between 36 and 48 inches above the finished floor.

Changes in Regulations:

The new STD-4C specification introduces a new parcel locker requirement of 1:5 – or one parcel locker for every Five mailbox customer compartments. However, this ratio may not be applicable if there is another method of accepting USPS parcel deliveries such as a staffed service desk.

The new STD-4C specification enhances security requirements for the entire mailbox receptacle. It requires:

- Heavier metal materials for construction.
- Improved tenant lock design, and.
- Larger compartment form factor: minimum size of 12″w × 15″d × 3″h.

to accommodate today's larger mail types and sizes

The new specification also eliminates the vertical form factor design.

The STD-4C specification also requires powder coated finishes; promoting greater corrosion and weather resistance on all centralized mail delivery equipment.

Locking mechanism design specifications are also much stronger, providing added mail and parcel security for the new STD-4C compliant mailboxes.

== Design enhancements ==
The modular design of STD-4C mailbox systems makes it easier to create wall-mounted layouts. The 4C specification allows for both single and double column modules in varying heights so be sure to check with each manufacturer in order to include the most extensive line of options for your project.

Outgoing mail slots are required in each 4C module. This means they can be used as stand-alone mailbox units or in multi-module layouts.

Larger compartment size accommodates catalogs, magazines and other types of "flat" mail without folding and rolling, thereby minimizing potential damage of the mail.

The STD-4C specification also provides for both a front-loading as well as rear-loading mailbox module.

Rear-loading 4C mailbox systems must be installed in a secured room.

If mail is delivered to each mailbox individually by the USPS, a key must be provided to the USPS to gain access to the secure mailroom itself (does not apply to private delivery where USPS delivers to one location and mail is distributed by others.)

It is generally preferred to have a key keeper installed outside the secure room. This way, the USPS can install their normal Arrow lock in the key keeper to gain access to the key for the mailroom.

== Approved manufacturers ==
Manufacturers must produce a mailbox which meets or exceeds all USPS Specifications and then submit a prototype to the USPS for rigorous testing and approval.

All STD-4C compliant mailboxes must meet the USPS design and installation regulation in order to receive a "USPS Approved" designation.

STD-4C

- 2BGlobal
- Florence Manufacturing Company
- Jensen Mailboxes
- Postal Products Unlimited
- Salsbury Industries
- Security Manufacturing
