= Speed limits in Finland =

Standard speed limits in Finland

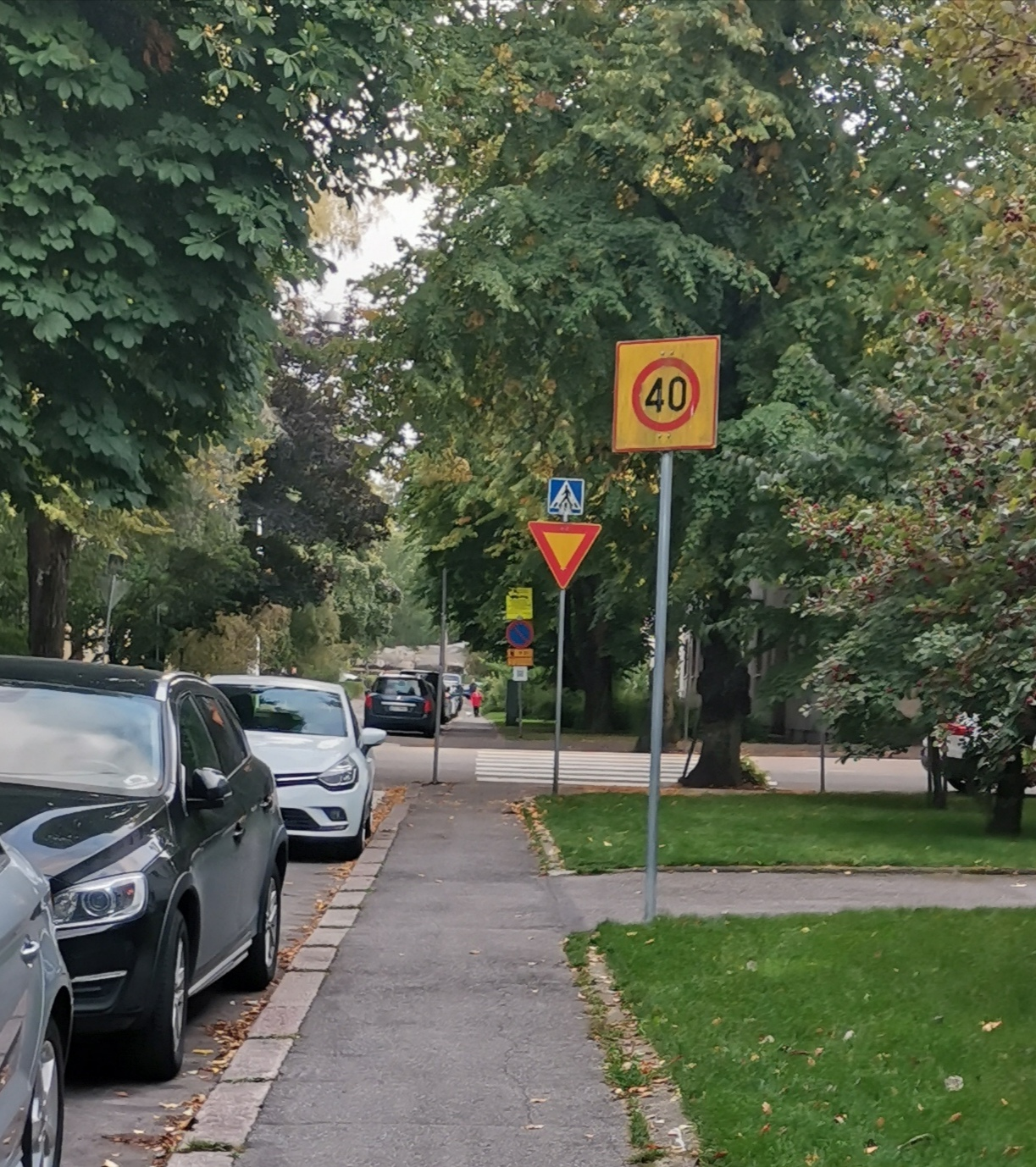
Finnish 40 km/h speed limit zone sign

Speed limits in Finland are generally:

- Motorways: 120 km/h
  - In winter limits are often lowered to 100 km/h as decided each year by local authority.
  - Motorways close to urban areas are always 100 km/h.
- Main provincial roads (paved)- 100 km/h or 80 km/h (by location, and often in winter).
- Rural roads- 80 km/h (paved or gravel), unless otherwise indicated.
- Within a built-up area- 50 km/h unless otherwise indicated.

The speed limits in Finland are 20, 30, 40, 50, 60, 70, 80, 100 and 120 km/h. But the signs are always displayed with the actual speed limit value rather than having «end of speed limit» signs, unlike most other countries in Europe.

== Usage of speed limits ==
- 20 km/h
  - Special streets in cities (pedestrian zones, yard streets)
- 30 km/h
  - In residential areas
- 40 km/h
  - In built-up areas
- 50 km/h
  - On big streets in built-up areas
- 60 km/h
  - On big streets in built-up areas
  - On small roads outside built-up areas
- 70 km/h
  - On big roads close to big cities
- 80 km/h
  - On rural roads
  - On single carriageway main roads especially in winter
- 100 km/h
  - On motorways close to big cities and in winter on all motorways
  - Expressways/dual carriageway main roads
  - Good quality single carriageway main roads especially in summer
  - Some good quality paved regional roads with low traffic in summer
- 120 km/h
  - Motorways in summer

== Max speed limits ==
Vehicle	Max speed
Buses	100 km/h
Trucks	80 km/h
Vehicles with light trailers	100 km/h
Vehicles with heavy trailers	80 km/h
Towing another vehicle	60 km/h
Mopeds	45 km/h
Light quadricycles	45 km/h
Tractors	60 km/h
Snowmobiles	60 km/h (80 km/h on ice)
