= Knox Box =

Wall-mounted safe for emergency access keys

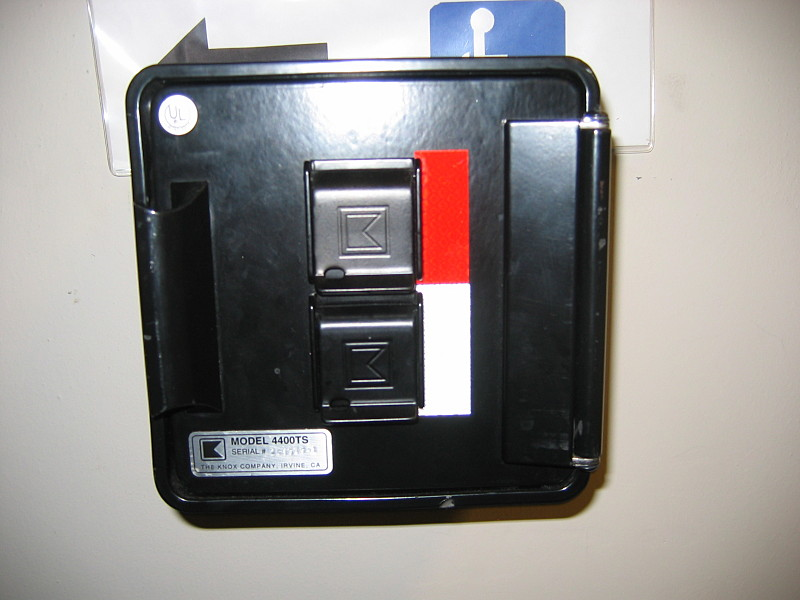
A Knox vault in an academic building

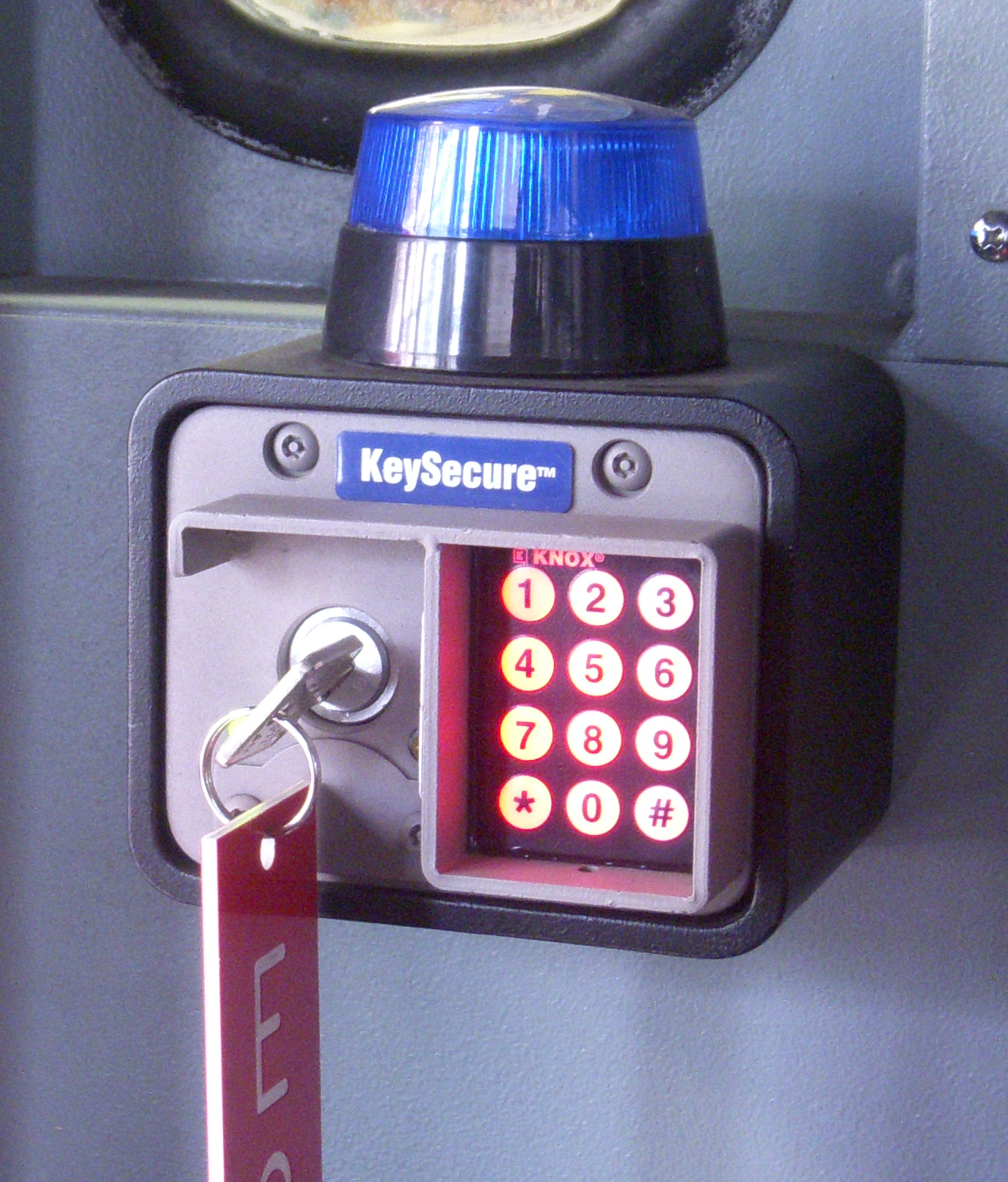
A Knox KeySecure, attached inside the cab of a fire engine, holds a high-security key to open KnoxBox key boxes in the area.

A Knox Box is a small, wall-mounted safe that holds building keys for fire departments, emergency medical services, and sometimes police to retrieve in emergency situations. A Knox Box can cut fire losses for building owners since firefighters can enter buildings without breaking doors or windows. It can also reduce the potential of a firefighter being injured forcing entry.

== Usage ==
The term "Knox-Box" is a brand name for such products produced by the American company Knox Associates, which does business as The Knox Company. The Knox Box is part of a line of security-related products marketed as the Knox Rapid Access System.

Local fire departments hold master keys to all Knox Boxes in their response area, enabling them to quickly enter buildings in their area without having to force entry or find individual keys held in deposit at the station.

Sometimes the Knox Master Key is stored in a key retention device such as Sentralok or KeySecure. Knox Master Key retention devices provide accountability on access to the key. KeySecure records an audit trail of when the key is accessed, while Sentralok requires a dispatcher to release the key with coded DTMF tones. Both Sentralok and KeySecure are also branded products of the Knox Company.

== Security vulnerabilities ==
The disadvantage of the system is that it provides a single point of failure for the security of many buildings. If the key to a district's Knox Box is stolen or copied, a thief can enter any building or gated perimeter in the area that relies on the system. Knox commercial boxes offer an optional internal tamper switch which can be wired to the building's fire alarm control panel to sound a supervisory alert if the box is opened.

The keys for Knox KeySecure are the same throughout a district (the extent of which depends on the district). At the February 2013 RSA Conference, a researcher publicized a possible exploit, claiming that he had successfully ordered a box, disassembled it, and used the information from disassembling the lock cylinder to create his own master key.

=== Security incidents ===
Several burglaries have exploited this weakness in practice. In Seattle, a man used a shaved key modeled on the Knox master key to break into at least three apartment buildings in 2013, and police identified around 40 similar incidents across the city, which led the fire department to rekey its boxes at a cost of more than $500,000. A separate case in 2019 involved two more suspects arrested for using the same method to steal cash and packages from Seattle buildings. In Austin, Texas, a man obtained a master key and used it to steal more than $31,000 from a hospital cashier's office, prompting the city to budget $300,000 to rekey roughly 6,000 boxes.

== See also ==
- Arrow lock – a proprietary lock often used by US Postal Service carriers to enter buildings
- Fire brigade key
- Real-estate lock box – a device used by real estate agents to facilitate access to keys
