= Fire brigade key =

Standardized keys used by fire services

Fire brigade keys are a set of standardized keys used in the United Kingdom to secure items which need to be kept locked against casual interference, but still need to be quickly and easily accessed in an emergency by fire brigades and other emergency services. Uses include securing areas such as common storage cupboards and equipment rooms and access control devices such as road barriers and movable bollards.

Fire brigade keys are not secret or restricted, and are widely available for sale from locksmiths and hardware stores. Because of their widespread availability, using these keys for secure applications has declined in popularity.

== See also ==
- Arrow lock
- Fireman's switch
- Knox Box
- Secure information box
