= CBU =

CBU may refer to:

== Broadcasting ==
- CBU (AM), a Canadian radio station (690 AM)
  - CBU-FM, another (105.7 FM)
- Caribbean Broadcasting Union, a regional television co-operative

== Education ==
- California Baptist University, Riverside, California, US
- Cape Breton University, Sydney, Nova Scotia, Canada
- Celal Bayar University, Manisa, Turkey
- Christian Brothers University, Memphis, Tennessee, US
- Chungbuk National University, Cheongju, South Korea
- Copperbelt University, Zambia

== Other uses ==
- Cluster bomb unit (CBU US model prefix)
- Cluster box unit, a centralised mailbox
- Cognition and Brain Sciences Unit, of the UK Medical Research Council
- Community Bank System, Inc.
- Knock-down kit ("CBU" for completely built up or completely built unit)
- Cottbus-Drewitz Airport (IATA: CBU)
- CBU, a cement board building material used in bathrooms
