= Letter box =

Receptacle for receiving incoming mail

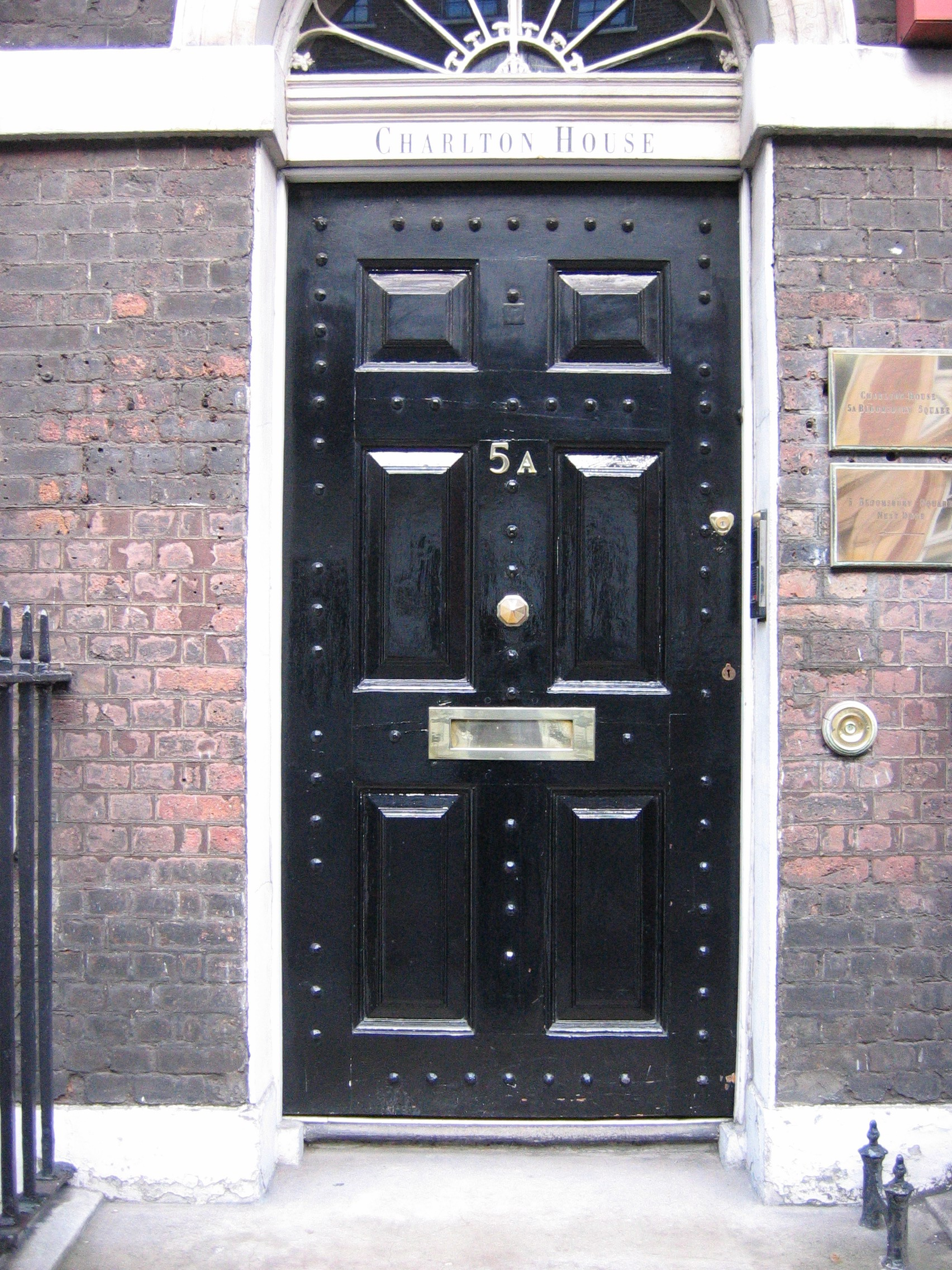
A mail slot in London, located in the middle of the front door

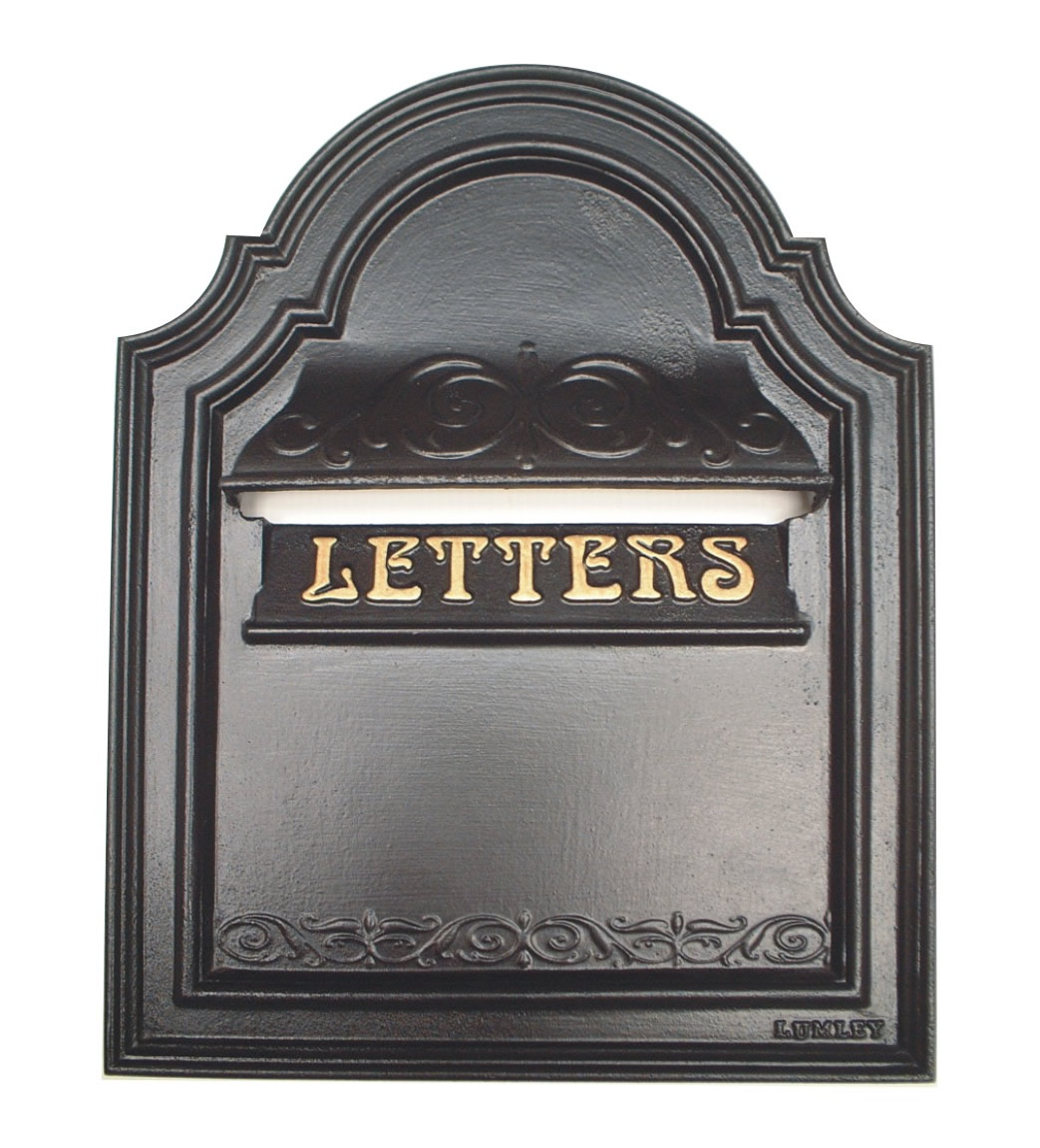
A cast-iron letter box

A letter box, letterbox, letter plate, letter hole, mail slot or mailbox is a receptacle for receiving incoming mail at a private residence or business. For outgoing mail, post boxes are often used for depositing the mail for collection, although some letter boxes are also capable of holding outgoing mail for a carrier to pick up. Letterboxes or mailboxes use the following primary designs:

- A slot in a wall or door through which mail is delivered (through-door delivery)
- A box attached directly to the building (direct-to-door delivery)
- A box mounted at or near the street (curbside delivery)
- A centralised mail delivery station consisting of individual mailboxes for an entire building also known as a "flock" throughout the South Island of New Zealand and parts of America.
- A centralised mail delivery station consisting of individual mailboxes for multiple recipients at multiple addresses in a particular neighborhood or community.

== Styles and usage ==
A "letter box", or "mail slot" in American and Canadian usage, is a slot, usually horizontal but sometimes vertical, about 30 by 5 cm (11.8 by 2.0 in), cut through the middle or lower half of a front door. This style is almost universal in British homes and offices, but in the US is limited primarily to urban areas. Most are covered by a flap or seal on the outside for weatherproofing. The flap may be closed by gravity, or sprung to prevent it opening and closing noisily in the wind. Some letterboxes also have a second flap on the inside to provide further protection from the elements. There may also be a small cage or box mounted on the inside of the door to receive the delivered mail. Mail slots are limited to receiving incoming mail, as most have no provision for securing and protecting outgoing mail for pick-up by the mail carrier. Sending mail from private addresses is possible in the UK, but Royal Mail usually charge an extra per-item fee for this service.

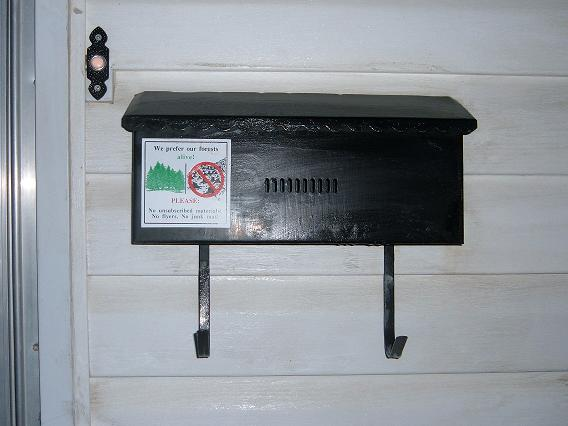
An attached or wall-mount letterbox, with a hook underneath for newspapers

Wall-mounted or attached mailboxes may also be used in place of mail slots, usually located close to the front door of the residence. They are known as "full-service" mailboxes when they have provisions for securing outgoing as well as incoming mail. Attached wall-mounted mailboxes are still used in older urban and suburban neighbourhoods in North America. They are especially common in urban and suburban areas of Canada, where the curbside mailbox is rarely seen except in rural areas. Attached mailboxes are less common in newer urban and suburban developments and in rural areas of the United States, where curbside delivery or delivery to a community mail station (cluster mailbox, known as a bank of post boxes in the UK) is generally used.

Rural and some suburban areas of North America may utilize curbside mailboxes, also known as rural mailboxes. These receptacles generally consist of a large metal box mounted on a support designed primarily to receive large quantities of incoming mail, often with an attached flag to signal the presence of outgoing mail to the mail carrier. In the US and Canada, rural curbside mailboxes may be found grouped together at property boundaries or road/driveway intersections, depending upon conditions. Although the United States Postal Service (USPS) has general regulations stating the distance a letter box may be from the road surface, these requirements may be changed by the local postmaster according to local environment and road conditions.

At one time, nearly 843,000 rural Canadian residents used rural (curbside) mailboxes for private mail delivery, though Canada Post has since required the installation of community mailbox stations for many rural residents.

In the US, wall-mounted or curbside mailboxes that are only designed for receiving incoming mail are known as "limited-service" mailboxes, while mailboxes equipped with a mechanism for notifying the postman to collect outgoing mail from the mailbox are known as "full service" mailboxes.

A number of designs of letterboxes and mailboxes have been patented, particularly in the United States. One design was the visible mailbox (because it was made of transparent glass) with a flip-up aluminium lid produced during the first part of the 20th century by George F. Collins of the Barlet-Collins Glass Company in Sapulpa, Oklahoma.

== Letter box standards and construction ==
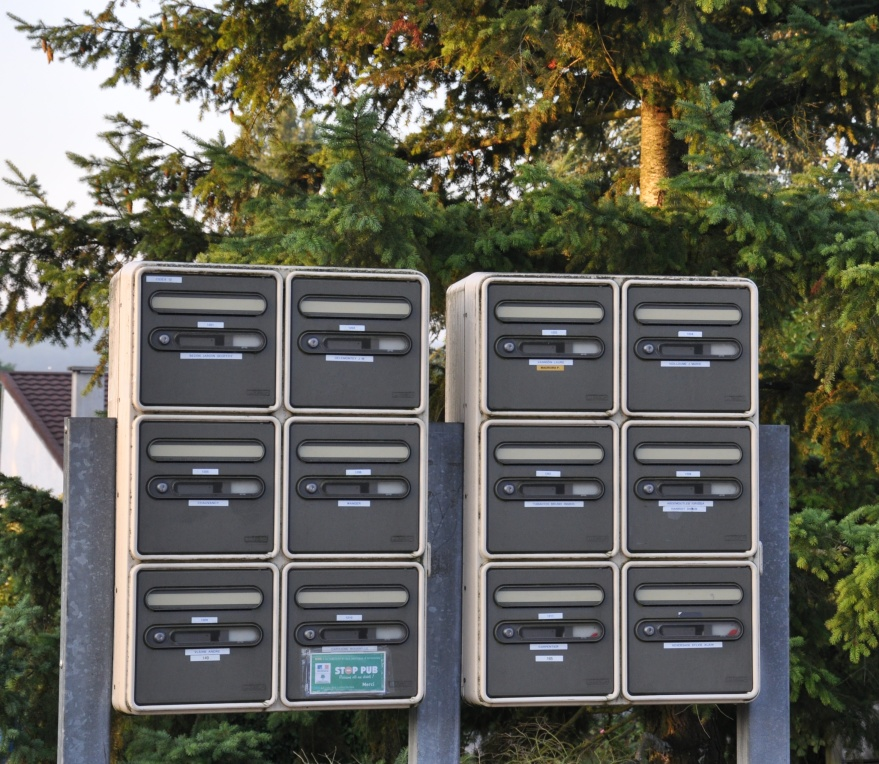
Community letter box station in France

=== Europe ===
The European standard for letter boxes, EN 13724:2002 "Postal services – Apertures of private letter boxes and letter plates – Requirements and test methods", replaces earlier national standards such as BS 2911:1974 "Specification for letter plates" or DIN 32617. It specifies among other things:

- Envelope size C4 (229 mm × 324 mm) must be deliverable without bending or damage
- The internal volume must able to hold at least a 40 mm high bundle of C4 envelopes
- Aperture width of either 230–280 mm (> C4 width) or 325–400 mm (> C4 height)
- Aperture height of 30–35 mm
- Mounting height of between 0.7 and 1.7 m for the aperture
- When positioned externally, the post box should not allow more than 1% total capacity water ingress from natural precipitation or moisture causes.
- Various privacy, theft-protection, vandalism resistance and corrosion-resistance test requirements

This standard is voluntary. It was developed by a German mail boxes manufacturer Burg Wächter.

=== Canada ===
For those neighbourhoods where mail delivery is to a mail slot, the mail slot must have an opening not less than 17.5 cm by 4 cm, and must be located in a front door or adjacent panel not more than 125 cm and not less than 60 cm from the finished floor line. Wall-mounted mailboxes equipped with a slot must have a slot opening measurement not less than 13.5 cm by 4 cm and the slot located on or near the top of the box.

Curbside mailboxes, known in Canada as rural mailboxes, must be weatherproof, have space for the name of the mailbox owner, and possess a signal device on the right-hand side (when facing the front of the mailbox) for pickup of outgoing mail. The signal device must rise above the mailbox and be visible at a distance, and must not obscure the mailbox owner's name or impede vehicular or pedestrian traffic. Canada Post requires all rural mailboxes to have a minimum interior dimensions of 45 cm in length by 17.5 cm in width by 17.5 cm in height for a rectangular mailbox, and 45 cm in length by 25 cm in diameter in the case of a cylindrical mailbox.

=== United States ===
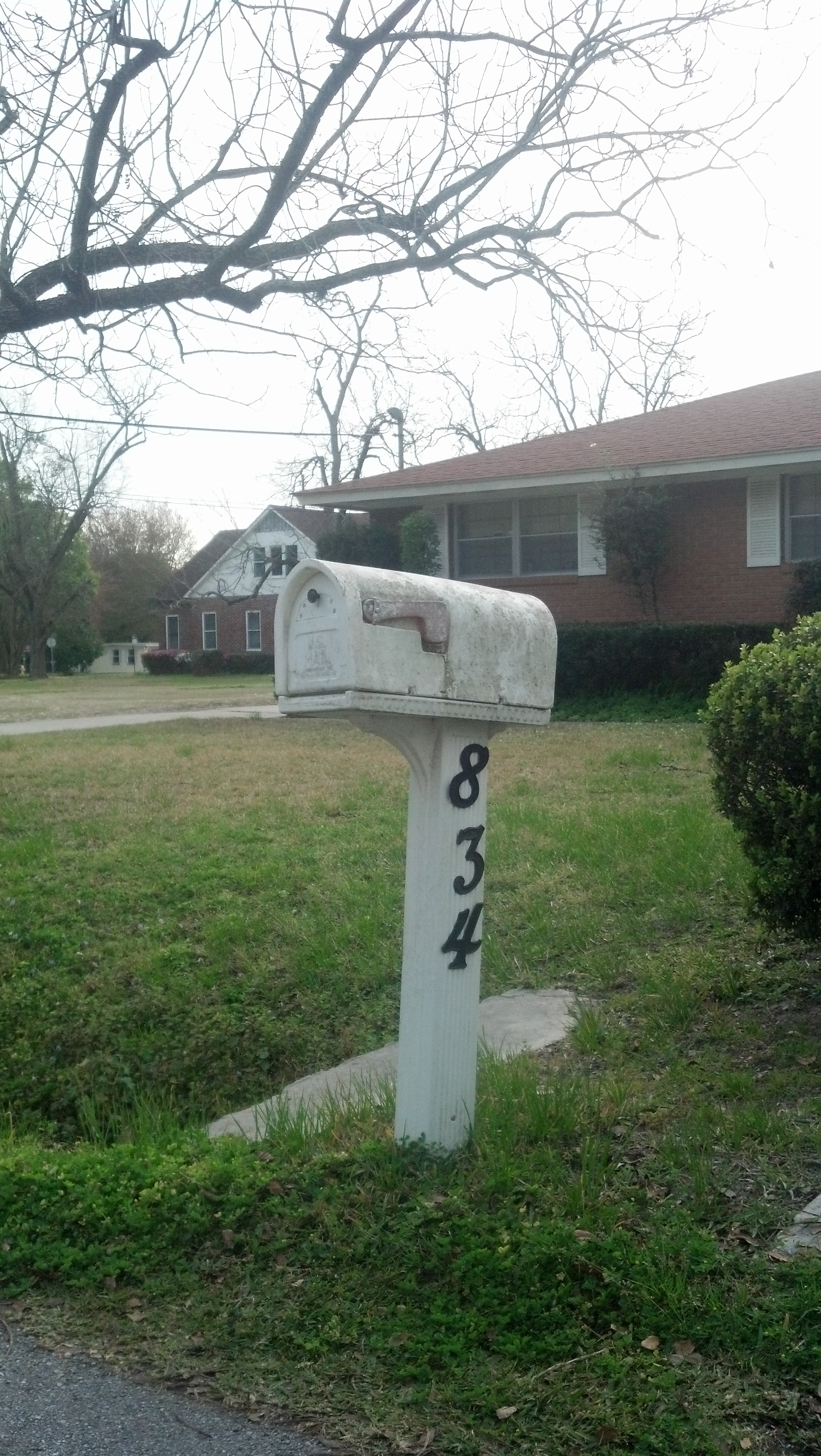
A plastic mailbox in Jacksonville, Florida, US

The US Post Office has established guidelines for mail recipients, including mail slot or mailbox size, location, and identification requirements. While the Post Office permitted alternative designs for attached mailboxes and mail slots that met basic size and construction requirements, the same was not true for curbside mailboxes, which postal regulations required be in the form of the traditional dome-rectangular or 'tunnel-top' design first established in 1915. In 1978, seven years after the establishment of the restructured US Postal Service, postal authorities at last approved a "contemporary" mailbox specification for alternative designs.

Currently, US curbside mailboxes are classified as (T) Traditional, (C) Contemporary, or (L) Locking. Traditional or Contemporary non-locking curbside mailboxes are approved in three sizes - No. 1, No. 2, or No. 3, measured by minimum interior dimensions. The largest acceptable curbside mailbox is the No. 3, which measures 22.81 inches long, 11 inches wide, and 15 inches in height (58 cm x 28 cm x 38 cm) at the peak. Locking mailbox designs that provide security for the recipient's incoming mail have fewer restrictions on shape and size, though designs with a slot for incoming mail must be at least 1.75 inches high by 10 inches wide. Residential locking mailboxes cannot require the postal carrier to have a key, by USPS Specifications. Therefore, no USPS approved residential locking mailbox has secure outgoing mail. Installation requirements vary from standard unlocked mailboxes: with locking mailboxes, the incoming mail slot must be 41"-45" above the roadside surface, and the front of the mailbox must be 6"-8" back from the curb. USPS specifications for all mailboxes mandate the same, except the placement of the 'incoming mail area' varies with a locking mailbox.

== Environmental conditions ==
External or curbside letter boxes are not temperature-controlled, and this can sometimes be a concern for temperature-sensitive products such as pharmaceuticals, live plants or other organisms, or chocolate candies. Conditions can include high or low temperatures outside of the recommended storage conditions for certain products. For example, the USFDA found that the temperature in a steel mailbox painted black could reach 136 °F (58 °C) in full sun while the ambient air temperature was 101 °F (38 °C).

== Security ==
There is a recommendation to have a lock on the letter box, if it is not built into a lockable door. Unlocked letter boxes are often used for identity theft, including the ordering of something valuable which is then stolen from the unlocked box. In the United States for example, by policy, the USPS will not deliver mail to an unlocked or unsecured box which is located at a centralized mailbox installation.

Letter boxes are often destroyed as a prank using fireworks.

== History ==
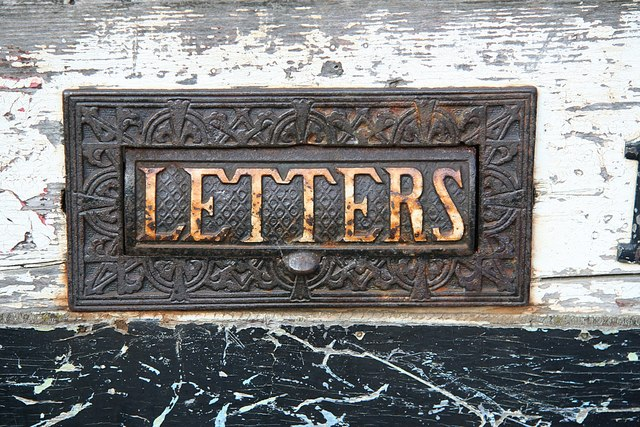
A 19th-century slot letterbox on the street known as Wormgate, in the town of Boston, in Lincolnshire

=== Europe ===
Private letterboxes or mail slots did not become popular in most of Europe until the mid to late 19th century, although they were used in Paris from the late 18th century. Earlier examples are recorded in Italy, where the town of Portaria preserves a plaque marking the site of a mailbox dated 1674, identified as the first in the country.

In 1849, the Royal Mail first encouraged people to install letterboxes to facilitate the delivery of mail. Before then, letterboxes of a similar design had been installed in the doors and walls of post offices for people to drop off outgoing mail. An example of such a wall box (originally installed in the wall of the Wakefield Post Office) is dated 1809 and believed to be the oldest example in Britain. It is now on display at the new Wakefield Museum.

=== North America ===
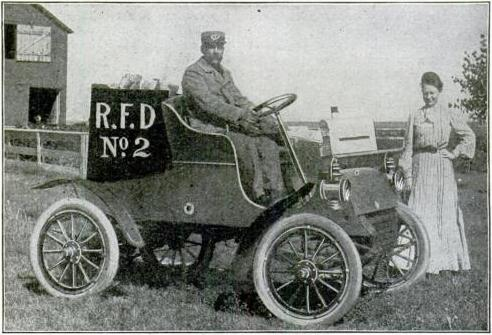
US Rural Free Mail Delivery to curbside mailbox, circa 1905

In 1863, with the creation of Free City Delivery, the US Post Office Department began delivering mail to home addresses.

Until 1916, mail carriers knocked on the door and waited for someone to answer. Efficiency experts estimated that each mailman lost over 1.5 hours each day just waiting for patrons to come to the door. To correct this problem, the Post Office Department ordered that every household must have a mail box or letter slot in order to receive mail. This requirement was phased in, starting with new delivery locations, around 1912. Slowly, homeowners and businesses began to install mail slots or attached mailboxes to receive mail when they were either not at home or unable to answer the door. The requirement was made mandatory in 1923.

As early as the 1880s, the Post Office had begun to encourage homeowners to attach wall-mounted mailboxes to the outside of their houses in lieu of mail slots. Mounted at the height of a standing man, attached mailboxes did not require the mail carrier to lean over to deposit the mail. They also allowed the homeowner to keep outgoing mail dry while awaiting pickup by the mail carrier.

To reduce the time required for the mail carrier to complete delivery when the front door of a home was located some distance from the street, it was proposed that individual mail boxes for residential or business customers be mounted curbside on fence-posts, lamp-posts, or other supports. While this idea was rejected for city mail delivery, it was adopted for rural areas. Curbside mailboxes located on a rural route or road and sited at the intersection of the road with each recipient's carriageway or private drive allowed limited numbers of mail carriers to deliver mail to many widely scattered farms and ranches in a single day using horse-drawn wagons or later on, motor vehicles.

Before the introduction of rural free delivery (RFD) by the Post Office in 1896, and in Canada in 1908, many rural residents had no access to the mail unless they collected it at a post office located many miles from their homes or hired a private express company to deliver it to them. For this reason, mailboxes did not become popular in rural North America until curbside RFD mail delivery by the Post Office was an established service. Even then, farmers and rural homeowners at first resisted the purchase of dedicated mailboxes, preferring to leave empty bushel baskets, tin boxes, or wooden crates at the roadside for the postman to deposit their mail. Not until 1923 did the Post Office finally mandate that every household install a mailbox or mail slot in order to receive home delivery of mail.

Originally designed only for incoming mail delivery, curbside mailboxes were soon fitted with a semaphore or signal flag mounted on an attached arm to signal the postman to pickup outgoing mail. Originally, this flag was raised not only by the resident of the property to signal the postman of outgoing mail, but also by the postman to inform the recipient that incoming mail had been delivered - a convenience to all during periods of freezing or inclement weather.

Since 1923, in order to promote uniformity, as well as the convenient and rapid delivery of the mail, the United States Post Office Department (later the USPS) has continued to retain authority to approve the size and other characteristics of all mail receptacles, whether mailboxes or mail slots, for use in delivery of the mails. The USPS continues to issue specifications for curbside mailbox construction for use by manufacturers. Approved mailboxes from the latter are always stamped "U.S. Mail" and "Approved by the Postmaster General". These standards have resulted in limitations on product diversity and design, though new materials, shapes, and features have appeared in recent years.

After World War II, postwar suburban home construction expanded dramatically in the United States, along with mail volume. By the 1960s, many new suburban homes were considerably larger and located on larger lots, yet most still used mail slots or attached wall-mounted mailboxes. This development caused a substantial increase in distances walked by the mail carrier, slowing mail delivery while increasing labor costs. In order to reduce delivery times and increase efficiency, the Post Office began requiring all new suburban developments to install curbside mailboxes in place of door-to-door delivery, allowing mail carriers to remain in the vehicle while delivering the mail. In 1978, the USPS (successor to the Post Office) declared that every new development must have either curbside delivery or centralized mail delivery.

==== Joroleman mailbox ====
In 1915, the Joroleman mailbox, named after its designer, Post Office employee Roy J. Joroleman, was approved by the U.S. Post Office. Joroleman, who held a degree in mechanical engineering, designed his mailbox with an unusual dome-rectangular shape, incorporating a curved, tunnel-shaped roof, latching door, and rotating semaphore flag. The Joroleman mailbox has been praised as a manifestation of American functionalist industrial design.

Constructed of light-gauge painted sheet steel, Joroleman designed his mailbox with an arched, tunnel-shape roof, which prevented excessive accumulation of rainwater or snow while resisting deformation. The tunnel top also simplified the process of mass production by eliminating the need for precise sheet metal bends. Stamped and formed metal straps riveted to the arched opening and the mailbox door served as a door latching mechanism, while a rotating red semaphore flag mounted on a shaft attached to the side of the mailbox served to signal the approaching mailman if there was outgoing mail inside. Fitted with a crimped or braze-on rear steel panel and a false floor to keep its contents dry in inclement or humid weather, the Joroleman mailbox required only two rivets, three axle bolts, and four screws and nuts for completion. Durable and inexpensive, the popularity of the Joroleman mailbox was further enhanced by a decision not to patent the design, but to make its specifications known to all potential manufacturers for competitive sale. Adopted across the United States, it has remained the top-selling mailbox since its introduction, and is also widely used in Canada (still used in suburban regions, despite that country's decision to eliminate individual curbside delivery to rural residents).

The Joroleman mailbox was originally approved for manufacture in one size, the No. 1, which could accommodate letter mail, periodicals, newspapers, catalogs, and small parcels. After July 1, 1916, the Joroleman mailbox would be the only design approved by the Post Office for new curbside mailbox installations. In July 1929, the Post Office approved specifications for a larger Joroleman mailbox known as the No. 2. The No. 2 mailbox, soon followed by the still-larger No. 3, could accept larger parcels and packages sent via Parcel Post; these large boxes proved particularly popular with rural mail recipients, who could order manufactured goods by mail for delivery to the farm or ranch.

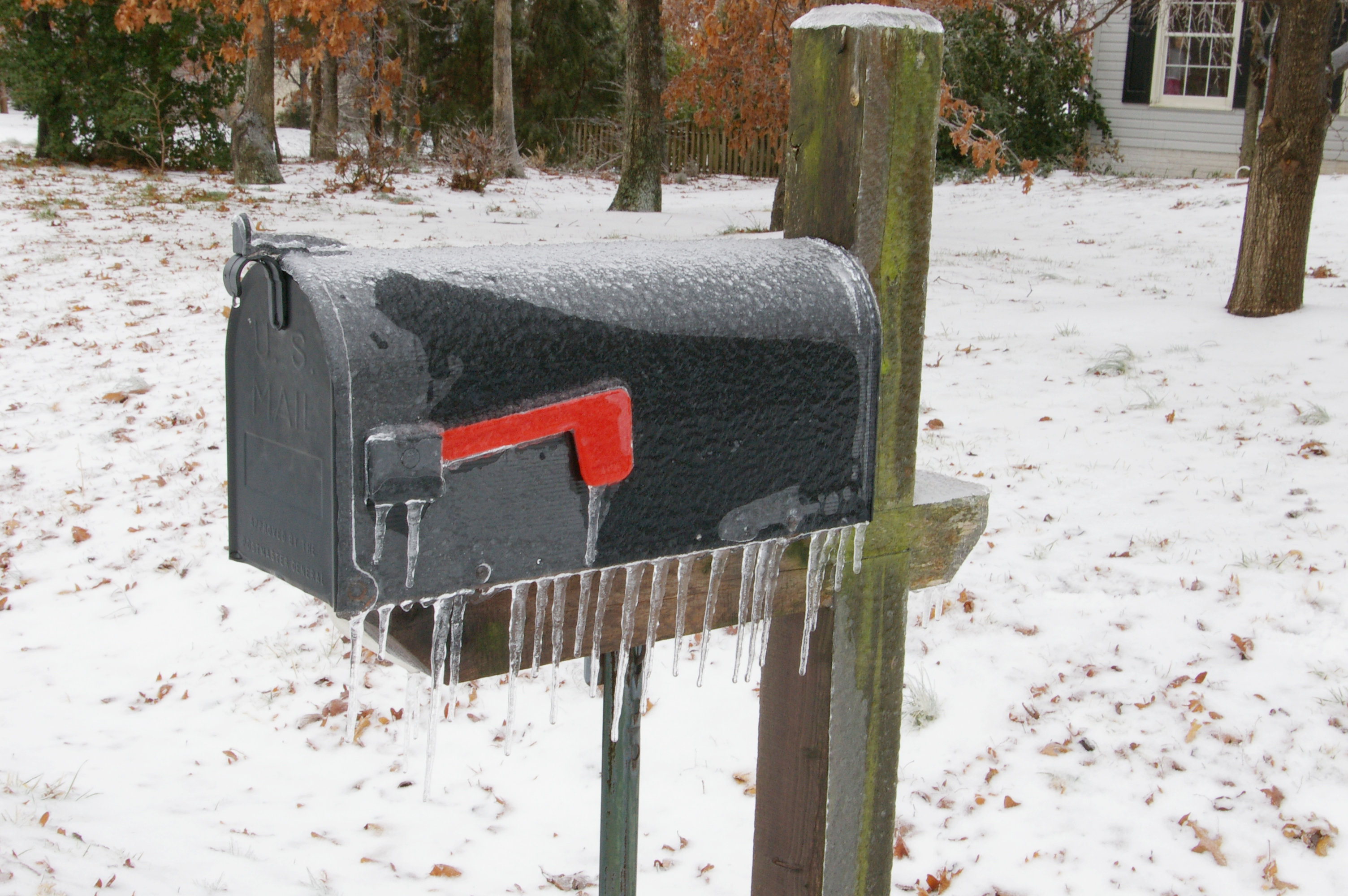
Joroleman curbside mailbox with red semaphore flag. When raised, the flag indicates outgoing mail.

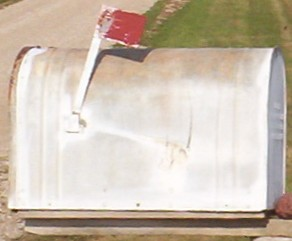
An oversize rural Joroleman mailbox in southern Nebraska, featuring a red semaphore arm

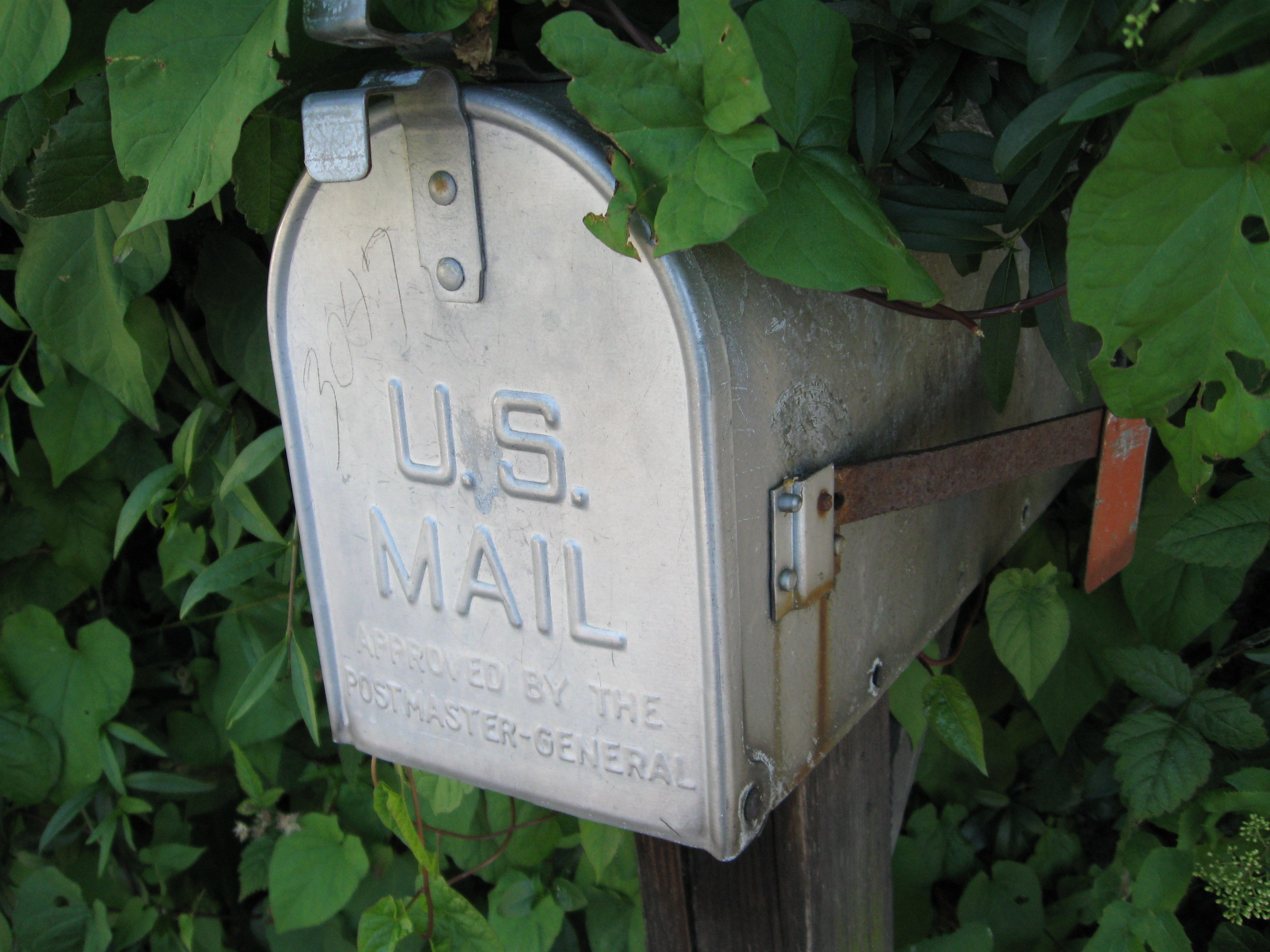
Close up of a Joroleman mailbox door with latch in Washington State

== Recent developments ==
=== Australia ===
Home Parcel boxes are being used in Australia to facilitate the delivery of parcels ordered over the internet as the letter box declines in use due to emails. Special locking mechanisms with dynamic codes are being used to create a new lock code on every delivery, ensuring greater security from petty theft. These lock codes are accessed by the delivery company using their barcode scanner and a standard barcode or QR code.

=== Canada ===
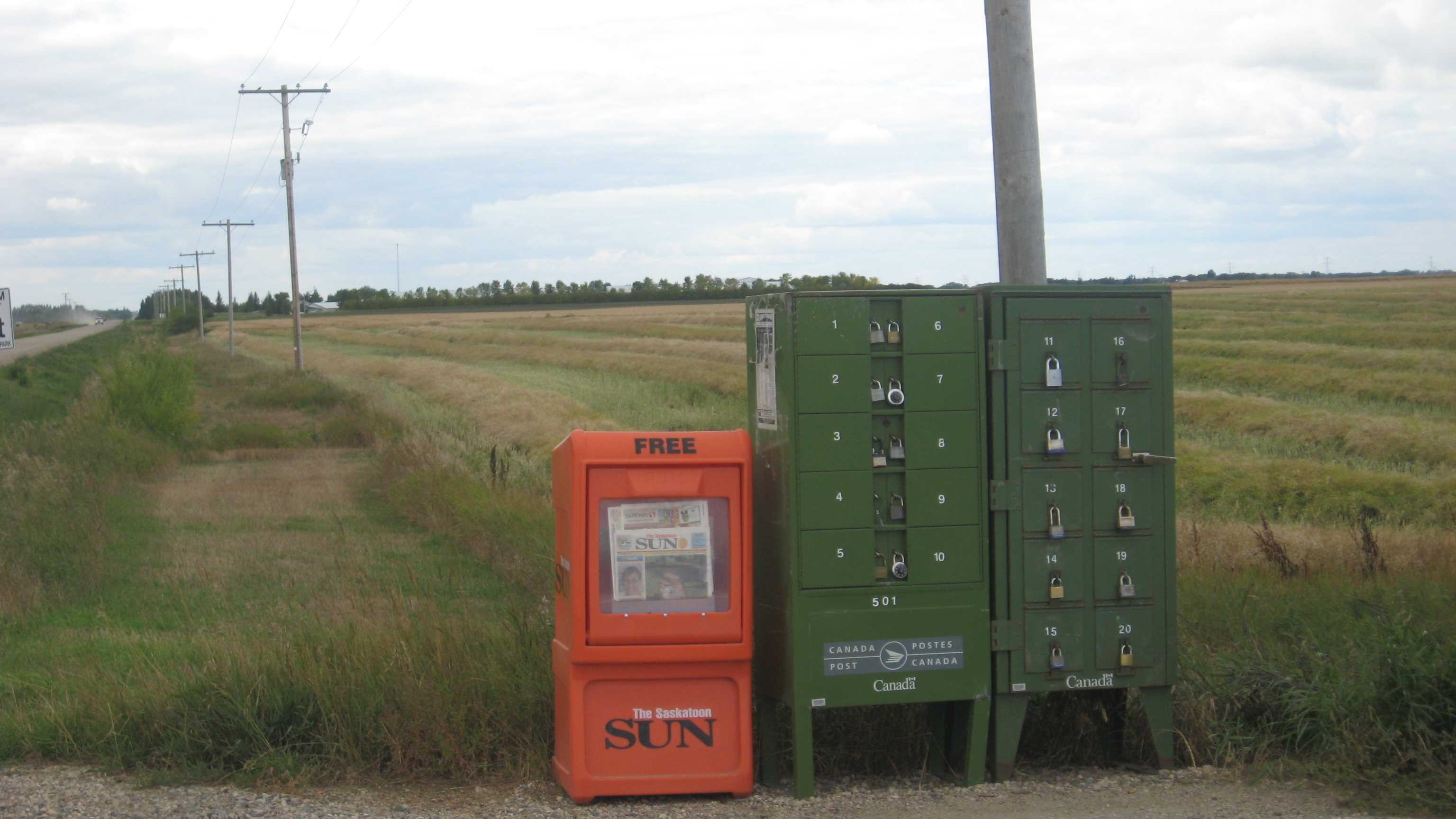
Rural Community Mail Box (CMB) Station in Canada

In Canada, community mailboxes (or Supermailboxes) appeared in the late 1980s in newer suburban areas. Newer developments usually are temporarily supplied with green rural community mail boxes and replaced later with permanent supermailboxes.

Since 2004, many rural Canadian residents have been required to use community mail stations (known as a Community Mail Box, or CMB) instead of individual curbside mailboxes in an attempt to reduce health and safety complaints by Canada Post rural mail carriers. This change has been extended to some suburban areas of the country as well.

In 2014, in an effort to cut costs, Canada Post announced its intent to phase out door-to-door delivery and adopt community mailboxes in 32% of urban centres. The plan faced criticism, especially due to accessibility concerns. As of September 2025, the federal government announced that it will allow the Crown corporation to shut down some rural locations and end its door-to-door delivery service.

=== Europe ===
==== United Kingdom ====
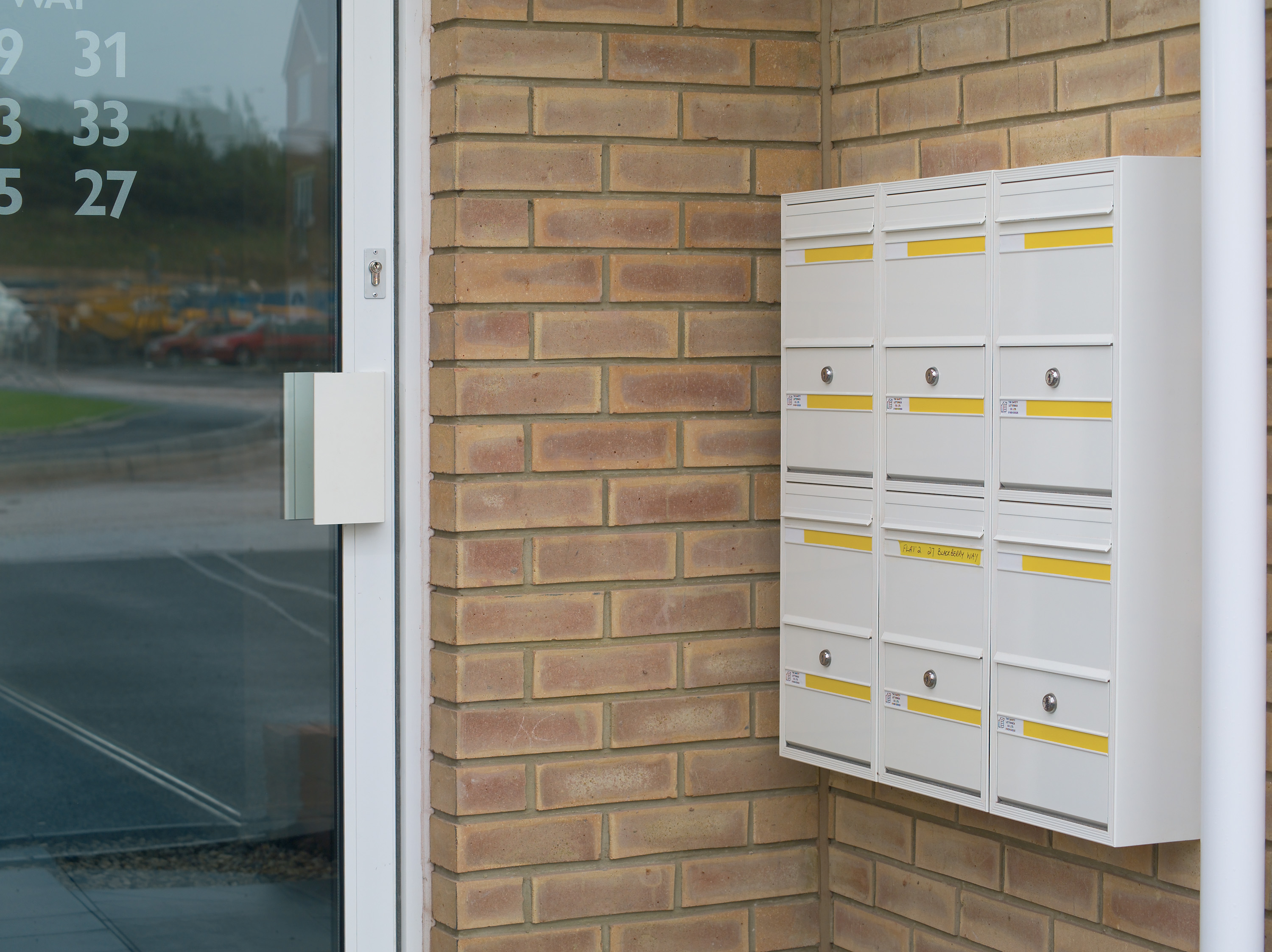
A bank of wall-mounted post boxes in the UK

Many designs of mailboxes have been created during recent years, with products suitable for both multi-occupancy residences (typically tower block private accommodation properties) and individual homes.

Deliveries of mail are typically made into the mailbox through an entry hole in the mailbox, where it drops into a secured compartment. The deposited items can only be retrieved by an individual using a coded key (designed to work only with that particular coded lock), or by entering a number sequence via a combination lock. Electronic locks can also be used with mailboxes, but they must be used in an internal location due to their vulnerability to inclement weather.

Mailboxes are commonly manufactured using zintec steel, aluminium, stainless steel or galvanised steel, and then powder-coated to meet the design requirements of the mail recipient. Mailboxes can also be manufactured using materials including cast iron and plastic, but these are less commonly seen in the United Kingdom.

The reclamation and reuse of original Royal Mail post boxes in private homes, many stocked and sold by salvage yards, led to questions from the public about the legal position regarding their reuse.

Mailboxes have slots, leading to possible vandalism or theft of deposited mail, but additional features are available to help reduce this, such as aperture restrictors, which allow the recipient to adjust the opening on their mailboxes.

In multi-occupancy buildings, especially new buildings, individual mailboxes are commonly grouped together in one location, allowing delivery people to deposit items without having to visit each individual door.

In 2019 the UK government agreed to ban low-level letter boxes after a campaign from the Royal Mail. However, as of 2023, the UK government has not taken action to ban low-level letter boxes.

=== United States ===
In 2001, the USPS first approved designs for locking curbside mailboxes to stem a rise in identity and mail theft. With these secure designs, the incoming mail is placed into a slot or hopper by the mail carrier, where it drops into a secure locked compartment for retrieval by only the homeowner (who retains a key or combination to the lock). Locking mailboxes are generally constructed of heavy-gauge steel or aluminum plate, though some models are made of roto-moulded polymer plastic.

Because of the increased risk of vandalism to curbside mailboxes, numerous vandal-resistant boxes made of composite plastic or heavy-gauge steel or aluminum plate have also entered the market. Some composite mailboxes made of resilient polymer plastics and mounted on ground spikes can resist severe impacts from baseball bats or even being run over by a vehicle.

Increases in postal service costs led to increased use of centralized mail delivery for new suburban neighborhoods and developments. A 1995 cost delivery study published in a USPS Operations handbook listed per-address annual delivery costs as: Door-to-door, $243; Curbside, $154; Cluster/flock Box (centralized mail delivery), $106.

Large apartment buildings usually have a cluster/flock of mailboxes for all units, located in the entry lobby or in a nearby dedicated mailroom. There often is a special lock box (also called a "key keeper" or "Knox box") located at the outside entrance, which either gives access to a front door key or directly activates the front door electric strike, to allow the mail delivery person to enter the building. A similar "Arrow lock" is usually located on the centralized mailbox, to allow the entire unit to be opened for efficient filling of individual mailboxes.

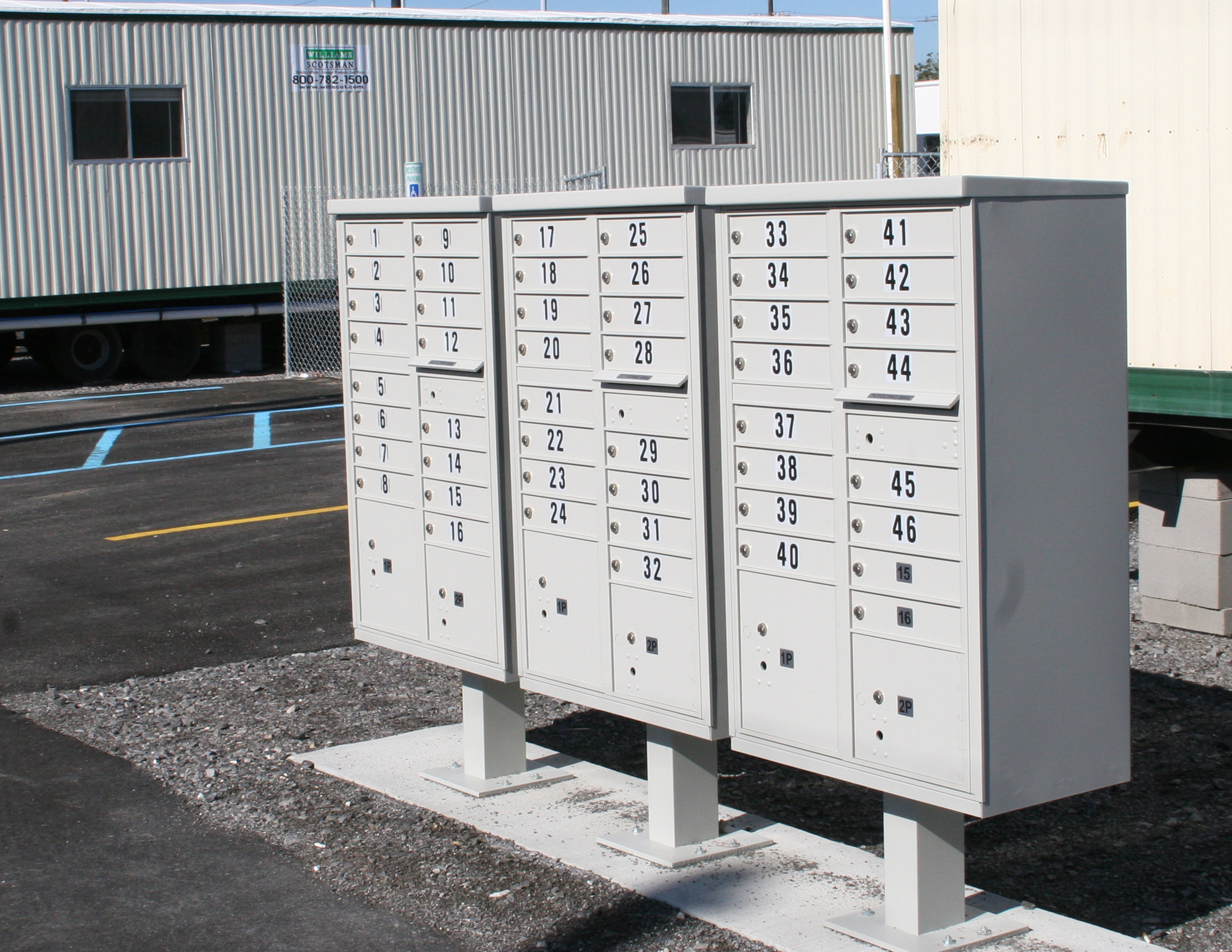
A USPS CBU Mail Station

In the US, a property with a single mailing address but with multiple mail recipients may utilize a community mail station designated CBU, or Cluster Box Unit. CBUs are typically stand-alone units that have locked individual compartments for each tenant in an apartment building, a trailer or mobile home park, or an office center.

By policy, the USPS is reluctant to establish direct to door delivery to new addresses, and now requires special approvals to initiate this service (Postal Operations Manual, Section 631.2) Instead, the USPS has insisted upon centralized mail delivery in virtually all newly constructed residential housing developments, condominiums, and gated communities by requiring or incentivizing the builder or developer to install larger NDCBU (Neighborhood Delivery Collection Box Unit) stations. CBUs and NDCBUs are both commonly known as cluster mailboxes. The NDCBU is a centralized community mail station with compartments for the centralized delivery of mail to multiple recipients at multiple addresses within a single neighborhood development or community.

In new housing developments, the NDCBU location is fixed by the developer, not the USPS, and may be located hundreds of yards away from the addressee's actual residence. A parcel locker for receipt of packages and a separate compartment for outgoing mail are usually built into the station. The mail carrier will have a key to a large door on one side that reaches all the compartments, and the residents or tenants will each have a key to the door into their individual compartment on the other side.

The location of the NDCBU in a community or business center is extremely important, since neighborhood cluster box installations located in remote or poorly lighted areas invite large-scale mail theft or vandalism. Even when located in a high-traffic location or inside a gated community, the NDCBU is a tempting target for thieves attracted by the possibility of recovering checks, cash, identifying information, or other valuables from multiple victims. A 2008 RAND Corporation study, citing USPS statistics collected between 2004 and 2007, found that NDCBU thefts constituted 52.7% of all urban neighborhood mail thefts and 76.6% of all rural neighborhood mail thefts from locations with more than one mailbox, with higher-income ZIP code zones having a substantially higher number of thefts than low-income ZIP code zones.

== Guinness World Record ==
The largest mailbox in the world is located in Casey, Illinois (US) and measures at 162.63 cubic metres (5,743 cu ft). It was created by Jim Bolin and was verified on 20 October 2015.

== Gallery ==
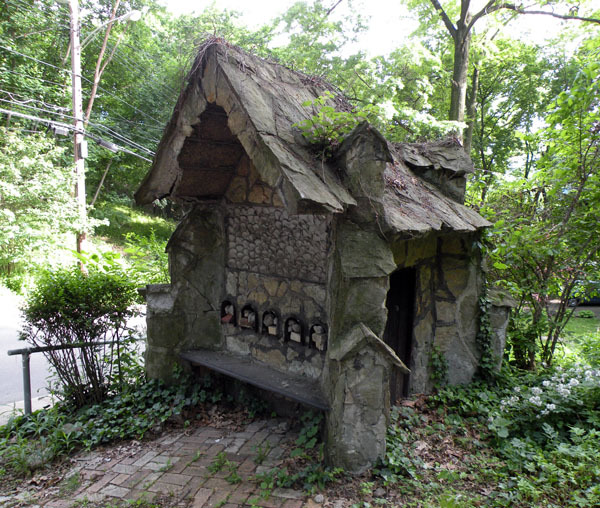
A fantastical mailbox designed by Frederick C. Sauer around 1930 in the Sauer Buildings Historic District in Aspinwall, Pennsylvania

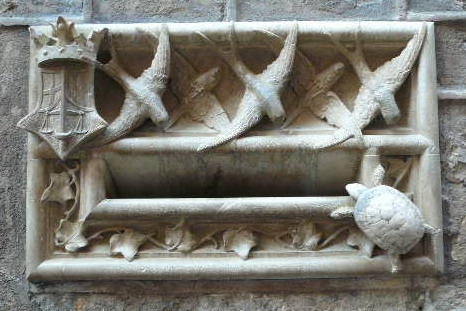
Mailbox of Casa de l'Ardiaca, Barcelona, Catalonia, by Lluís Domènech i Montaner

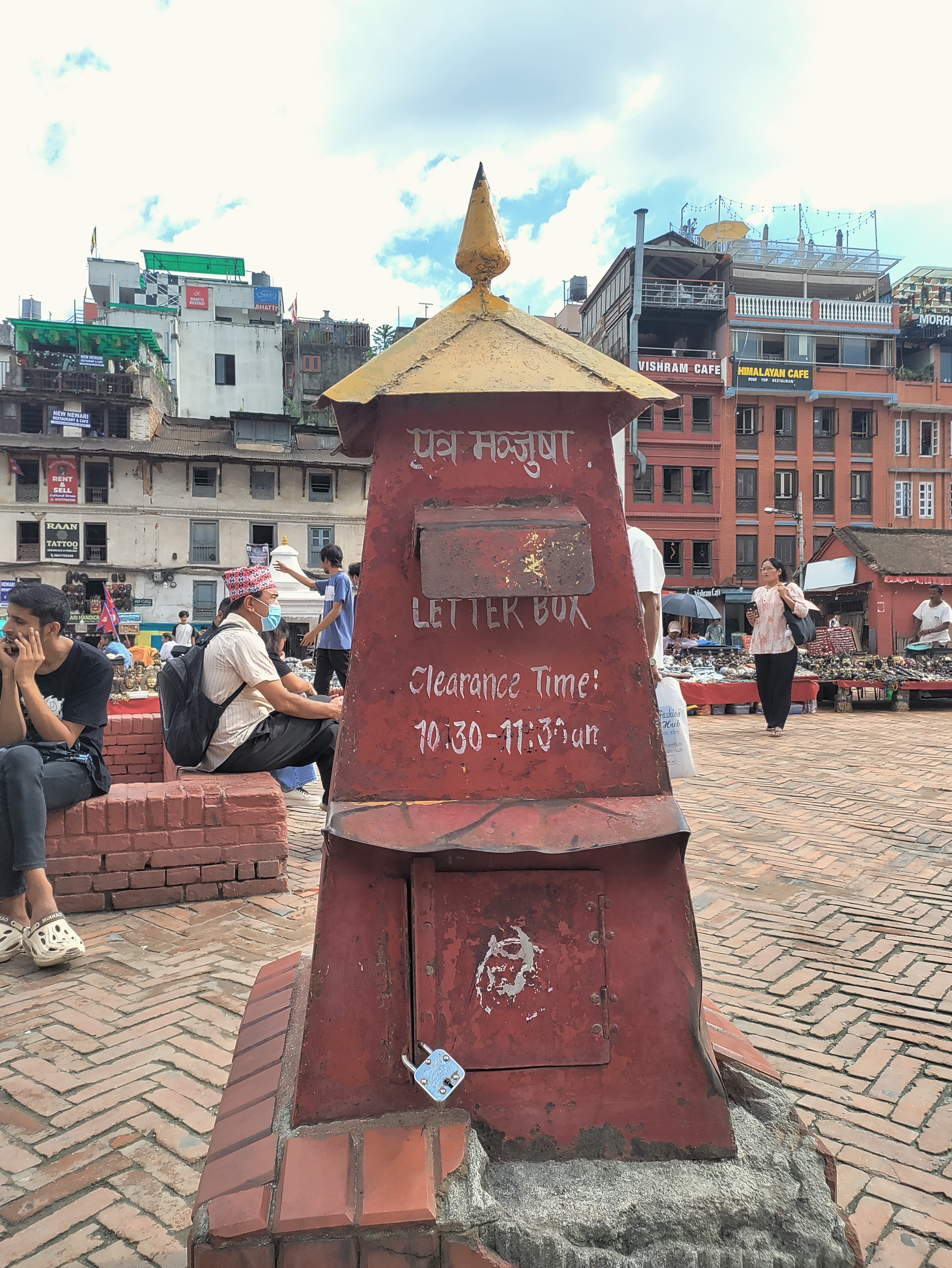
Letter box in Basantapur, Kathmandu, Nepal.

== See also ==
- Direct marketing
- House numbering
- Mail chute
- Mail bag
- Mailbox baseball
- Pillar box
- Post box
