= Real-estate lock box =

Locked storage box for keys

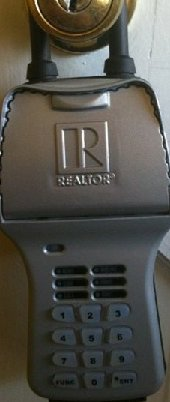
A realtor lock box hanging on the doorknob of a house for sale

A real-estate lock box is a padlock-shaped box that generally hangs around the doorknob of a house that is on the market. The device holds the keys to a house to allow common access for all real estate agents, while continuing to keep them secure. Permission is generally required from the seller or the owner to install such a device on the door. Lock boxes can also be used for the general storage and security of keys for access by family members or other affiliated groups.

Traditional real estate lock boxes are secured either with a physical key, a security code, or a swipe card, while newer wireless electronic versions may operate in tandem with mobile devices, incorporating logging and remote control or configuration.

New technology allows for computer-generated codes to open a lockbox. When a buyer's agent requests to see a property, a computer program will send a one-time code to the agent for a single timed entry. This feature allows for maximum security, and is nearly the equivalent to changing the lock every time a customer leaves. Other locks may use mobile apps to grant access upon arrival of the customer.

== See also ==
- Knox Box—A type of lock box with a similar purpose, intended for use by firefighters or other emergency personnel
