= Rural delivery service =

Rural delivery service refers to services for the delivery of mail to rural areas.

In many countries, rural mail delivery follows different rules and practices from that in urban areas. For example, in some areas rural delivery may require homeowners to travel to a centralized mail delivery depot or a community mailbox rather than being directly served by a door-to-door mail carrier; and even if direct door-to-door delivery is offered, houses still may even not have their own unique mailing addresses at all, but an entire road instead may be assigned a single common address, such as a rural route number.

Examples include Rural Free Delivery in the United States, the rural route system in Canada, and the Rural Mail Box addressing system in Australia.

Because of the differences in the handling and delivery of mail in rural areas, rural letter carriers often follow different regulatory standards from urban postal workers; for example, rural postal delivery workers may not be required to wear a uniform and may be allowed to use their own vehicles rather than driving a postal truck. In Canada, rural letter carriers were for many years not considered employees of Canada Post but private contractors.

== See also ==
- List of postal entities
- Timeline of postal history
- Rural Internet
