= Master keying =

Key designed to operate multiple locks

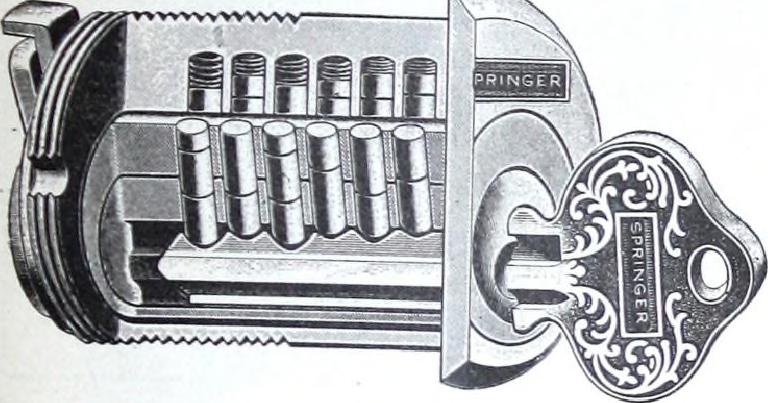
Master key turning a pin tumbler lock with two shear points

A master key operates a set of several locks. Usually, there is nothing different about the key. The differences are in the locks the key will operate. These master-keyed locks are configured to operate with two, or more, different keys: one specific to each lock (the change key), which cannot operate any of the others in the set, and the master key, which operates all the locks in the set. Locks that have master keys have a second set of the mechanism used to operate them that is identical to all of the others in the set of locks. For example, master keyed pin tumbler locks often have two shear points at each pin position, one for the change key and one for the master key. A far more secure (and more expensive) system has two cylinders in each lock, one for the change key and one for the master key.

Master keyed lock systems generally reduce overall security. The fact that some pin chambers have two shear points allows for more options when picking and it also allows for more keys to operate. For example, a standard 6 pin cylinder, which was designed to be operated by only one key, can be operated by up to 2^{6} = 64 keys if there are two shear points in each chamber.

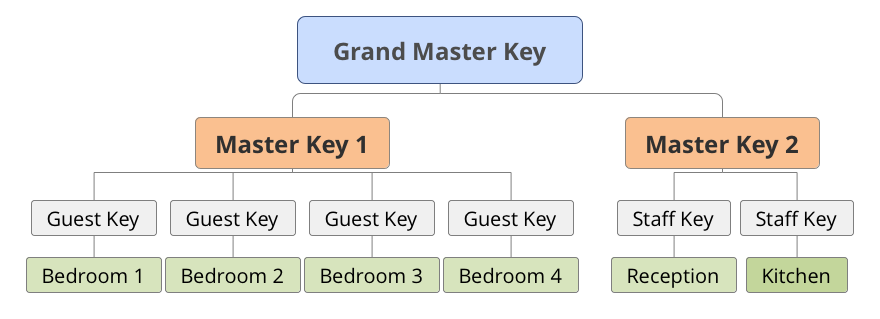
An example tree of master keys for a hotel

Larger organizations, with more complex systems, may have several levels of master keys, where the top level key works in all of the locks in the system. To visualize this, it can be thought of as a hierarchical chart, or a tree.

A practical attack exists to create a working master key for an entire system given only access to a single master-keyed lock, its associated change key, a supply of appropriate key blanks, and the ability to cut new keys.

Locksmiths may also determine cuts for a replacement master key, when given several different key examples from a given system.

== Maison key system ==
A maison key system is one that permits a lock to be opened with a number of unique, individual keys. Maison key systems are often found in apartment building common areas, such as main entrance or a laundry room where individual residents can use their own apartment key to access these areas. Unlike a master key system, where each individual lock has one individual operating key and one common master key, a maison lock is designed to be operated by every key within the system.

Because of the inherent lack of security in the maison key system, some jurisdictions prohibit the use of maison key systems in apartment and condominium complexes. In such locations, access is usually facilitated by either a high-security, key-controlled system or the use of electronic access control systems such as a card reader.

== See also ==
- Skeleton key
- Fire brigade key
