= Secure information box =

Box containing information for firefighters

A secure information box, also known as a premises information box, is a lockable box mounted on the outside of a building that contains building plans and contact information intended for use by emergency services. Secure information boxes have been a mandatory requirement for high-rise residential buildings in England since January 2023 under Regulation 4 of the Fire Safety (England) Regulations 2022.

The requirement for secure information boxes on high-rise residential buildings was introduced following the Grenfell Tower Inquiry to address the lack of immediate access to building information that was one of the exacerbating factors of the Grenfell Tower disaster.
