= Arrow lock =

Type of mail lock

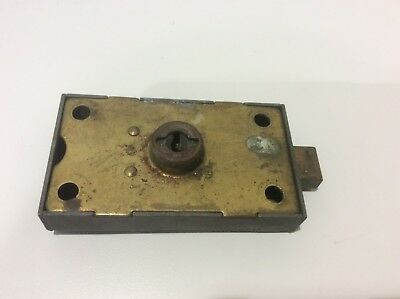
A USPS Arrow Lock, uninstalled

An arrow lock is a lock with standard dimensions used by the United States Postal Service for mail carriers to access collection boxes, outdoor parcel lockers, cluster box units, and apartment mailbox panels. Arrow locks are unlocked through the use of a corresponding arrow key. Arrow locks are also referred to as Master Access Locks.

== Dimensions and mounting ==
An arrow lock is metal and rectangular, measuring 2.005 in × 3.566 in × 0.620 in (50.9 mm × 90.6 mm × 15.7 mm) with a keyhole in the center. When the user turns the key, a metal bar that normally protrudes from one side is moved through the lock to the other side. This action may be used to release a door (as in the case of a collection or parcel box) or to press/release a switch (as in the case of an electronic door release).

Arrow locks have four mounting holes, which are evenly spaced at the corners, providing for secure attachment to four 10-32 threaded studs with metal nuts. A 7/8 in (22 mm) hole in the mounting surface is necessary to accommodate the keyhole, which protrudes above the surface of the lock. USPS approved parcel lockers, cluster box units, and apartment mailbox panels will be manufactured with the hole and studs to accommodate an arrow lock.

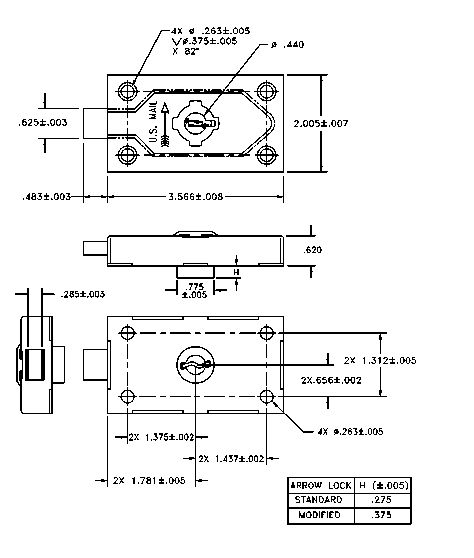
Schematic for a USPS Arrow Lock

=== Use in key keepers ===
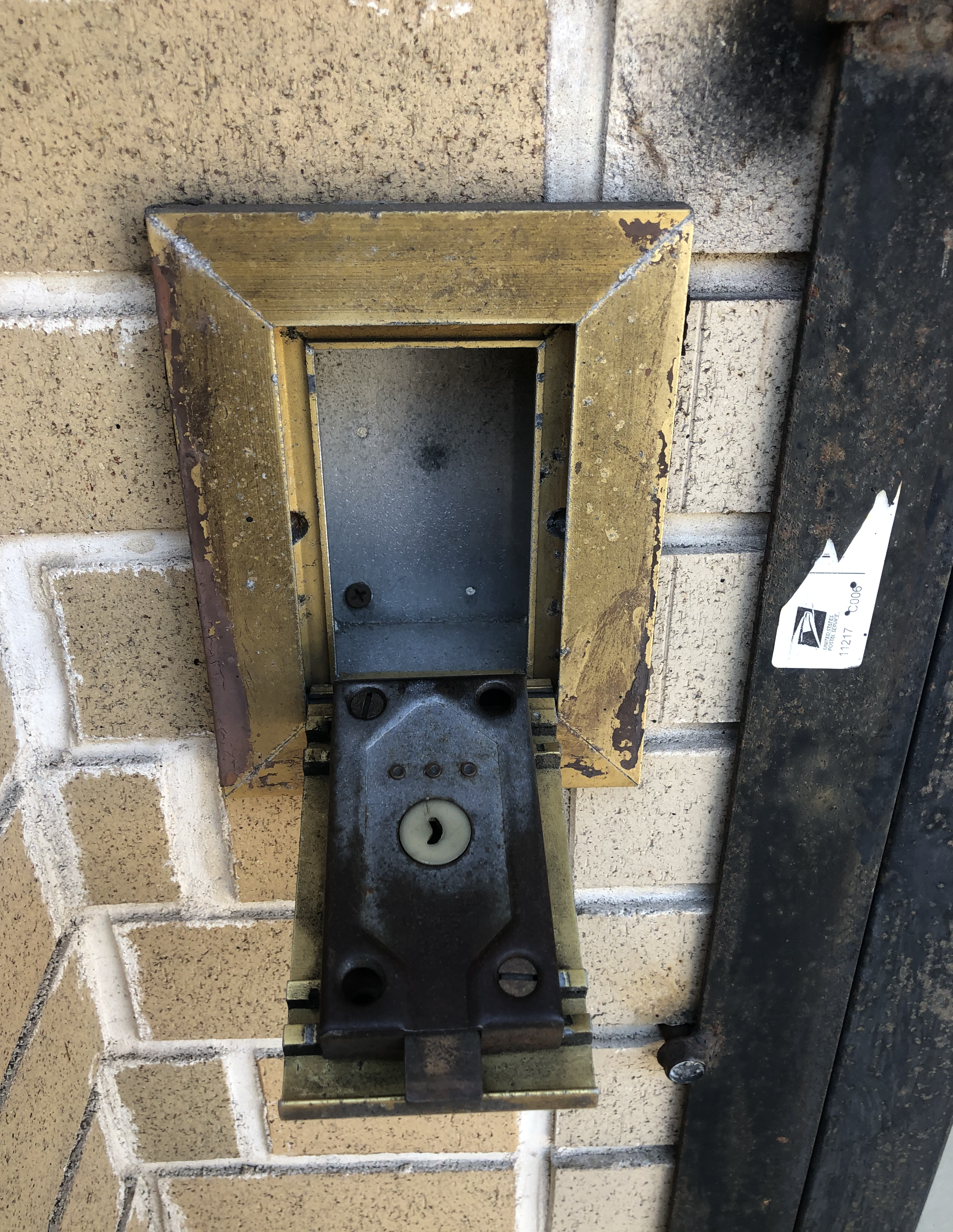
An apartment building key keeper with the door open, showing a USPS arrow lock

In addition to actual mail delivery receptacles, arrow locks can also be found in key keepers, which are small lock boxes containing another key to a secured area where the mail receptacles are located. Similar to knox boxes, key keepers secured with an arrow lock allow postal carriers to access the lobby of unstaffed multifamily buildings to deliver mail.

=== Private use lock conversion ===
Conversion locks are available that match the mechanism and dimensions of USPS arrow locks, but are keyed for private use.

== Process for obtaining arrow lock ==
To obtain a new or replacement arrow lock, a property owner or manager must contact their local post office branch. The arrow lock will be installed by USPS personnel.

== Arrow key accountability ==
Arrow keys are meticulously accounted for, and postal workers must check them out and return them daily. When checked out, the arrow key is connected to the postal worker's uniform with a chain to make it harder to misplace.

A United States Postal Service Office of Inspector General audit in 2020 found the controls to be ineffective. It stated that the number of arrow keys in circulation is unknown and keys are not adequately reported lost or stolen.

=== Illegal use of arrow keys ===
Lost or stolen arrow keys have been used by criminals to gain entry to apartment buildings and steal mail, often to commit identity theft. Some criminals may also create counterfeit arrow keys to gain access.

Arrow keys have been the subject of increasing security concern in the United States due to rising theft and misuse. Arrow keys operate within a master-key system that allows a single key to open multiple collection boxes and centralized mail receptacles. The underlying master-key locking architecture dates to the early 20th century, with systems of this type in use by the U.S. Post Office Department by the early 1920s.

Publicly reported data indicate a substantial increase in arrow-key thefts beginning in 2020. According to figures cited in U.S. Postal Service Office of Inspector General (OIG) audits and congressional testimony, reported incidents rose from approximately 1,374 in 2020 to 3,437 in 2024, representing an increase of roughly 150 percent over that period. Recovery rates for stolen arrow keys remained low throughout this period, with fewer than 10 percent recovered in most reported years.

In addition to documented thefts, law-enforcement agencies and prosecutors have reported the circulation of counterfeit arrow keys within criminal markets. Court filings and press statements indicate that counterfeit keys can be manufactured or acquired without the physical theft of an original key, potentially expanding unauthorized access beyond what is reflected in reported theft statistics.

Security analysts have noted that reliance on a master-key architecture creates systemic risk, as the compromise of a single key can provide access to numerous mail receptacles. These vulnerabilities have been linked to broader concerns involving mail theft, check fraud, and identity theft, and have prompted calls from oversight bodies for modernization of mailbox locking systems and expanded preventive security measures.

The Post Office has announced "Project Safe Delivery" to combat postal theft and tampering. In some areas of the US, the Post Office has started to use proprietary electronic locks ("eArrow") to allow their personnel to have secure access to buildings or mailboxes.
