= Centralized mail delivery =

Form of mail delivery system

Centralized mail delivery is a unique form of mail delivery system where a letter carrier provides delivery and collection services to a number of residences from a centrally located installation – whether in a single-family subdivision or multi-family structure. Business customers also receive delivery services from a convenient central location. Centralized mail delivery equipment can be in the form of any "clustered" type mailbox – including free-standing, pedestal-mounted cluster box unit (CBU), or other cluster mailboxes mounted in a wall, kiosk, or shelter. The U.S. Postal Service prefers centralized mail delivery in all new construction because it is less expensive. The United States Postal Service aims to continue to review and modify its operations to provide universal service as efficiently and cost effectively as possible. Therefore, there is pressure to establish centralized mail delivery, which is required in some communities.

== History ==
Mail delivery can be traced back to its system founder and first Postmaster, Benjamin Franklin.

Since that time, the amount of new mail delivery points have steadily increased from year to year to its present estimate of 1.4 million new delivery points a year.

Part of the change in mail delivery can be traced to the changes in transportation over the years. Horseback, dog sled, train, car, plane, boat, and truck have all been used to deliver the mail. As the delivery territories have grown, so, too, has the need for more efficient delivery techniques.

During the nineteenth and early twentieth centuries, letter carriers knocked on the door and waited patiently for someone to answer. Efficiency experts estimated that each carrier lost an hour and a half each day just waiting for patrons to come to the door.

To gain back those precious hours, in 1923 the Post Office Department mandated that every household have a mailbox or letter slot to receive mail.

By the 1930, as a convenience to customers living on the margins of a city, letter carriers began delivering to customers with “suitable boxes at the curb line.” Multiple receptacles appeared, but with no regulation.

In the ensuing decades American suburbanization, which exploded in the 1950s, brought an increase in curbside mailboxes. The initial suggestion for the creation of the cluster box was submitted by Peter McHugh, a postal carrier in Los Angeles Ca. The Post Office Department first introduced curbside cluster boxes in 1967.

By 2001, the US Postal Service (USPS) was approving locking mailbox designs to help customers protect their mail. Neighborhood Delivery Collection Box Units (NDCBUs) were the predecessor to today’s cluster box units. They had multiple compartments for the centralized delivery of mail to the residents of a building or an entire neighborhood, instead of door-to-door or curbside delivery. These NDCBUs transformed into the “E” series cluster box units (CBU).

== Cluster Box Unit ==
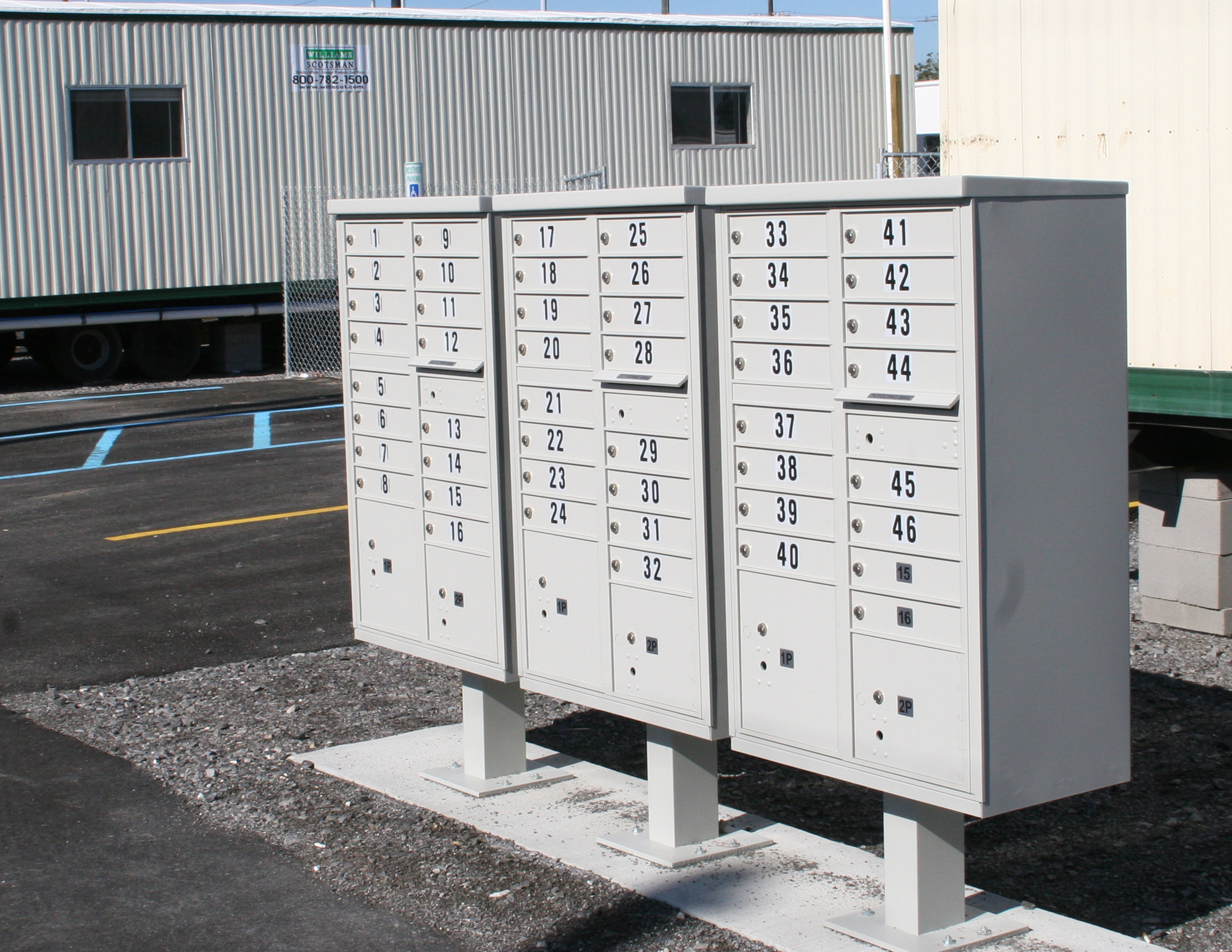
A USPS CBU Mail Station

New cluster box unit (CBU) specifications were then developed in 2005 and became the standard for all manufacturers. Only manufacturers who are approved by the USPS may produce the new “F” series CBU.

The USPS began to officially license this new standard in 2007 – now manufacturers must be approved and licensed in order to manufacture the CBU.

Like its predecessor the NDCBU, each CBU has multiple compartments for the centralized delivery of mail to the residents of an entire neighborhood, eliminating the need for door-to-door or curbside delivery. This new design also incorporates a parcel locker and an outgoing mail slot for resident convenience. At one time, some manufacturers even offered a high security CBU option for those areas which require a bit more protection. However, the high security CBU was discontinued in early 2016.

While the CBU models have parcel lockers built into each box, individual outdoor parcel lockers (OPL) were developed to increase the total amount of parcel lockers available within a single neighborhood installation.

Just like the CBU, the OPL design has evolved over the years as well. The latest USPS approved design includes taller parcel compartments to better accommodate package sizes of today.

In addition, to help “dress up” the CBU, some manufacturers have developed USPS Approved caps and pedestals. Available in various designs, these fashionable snap-together accessories place the final touches on the CBU so that it will complement the surrounding architecture. Only caps and pedestals which have been approved by the USPS can be added to the officially licensed CBU. [edit] Other Equipment Options The USPS created guidelines to dictate that wall-mounted vertical or horizontal wall-type boxes are to be specified in these settings. To represent the various levels of “approval” by the USPS, these wall-mounted mailboxes have been “rated”.

Former approval standards were considered STD-4B+ and related to specific form factors and security levels of the mailbox. Today, STD-4B+ mailboxes are only USPS approved for replacing existing STD-4B+ applications.

New USPS regulations related to wall-mounted, clustered type of mailboxes were introduced in 2004. These were the first changes to “apartment style” mailboxes in more than 30 years.

This new regulation, STD-4C, replaces all previous regulations for mailboxes such as these, which were previously approved under STD-4B and STD-4B+.

== USPS Approved Manufacturers ==
CBU

- Florence Manufacturing Company
- Postal Products Unlimited Inc.
- Salsbury Industries

STD-4C

- 2BGlobal
- Florence Manufacturing Company
- Jensen Mailboxes
- Postal Products Unlimited Inc.
- Salsbury Industries
- Security Manufacturing

STD-4B+

- American Device Manufacturing (Company purchased by Florence Manufacturing; Horizontal units only)
- American Eagle Mailboxes
- Bommer Industries, Inc.
- Florence Manufacturing Company
- Jensen Mailboxes
- Salsbury Industries
- Security Manufacturing

== Controversy ==
While centralized mail delivery is the preferred method of delivery by the United States Postal Service for new developments, some residents of these communities are opposed to centralized mail delivery. Those opposed are heavily in favor of conventional door to door or curbside delivery and/or do not like the idea of CBUs in their neighborhood.

== See also ==
- Post office box
