= Interchangeable core =

Type of lock cylinder

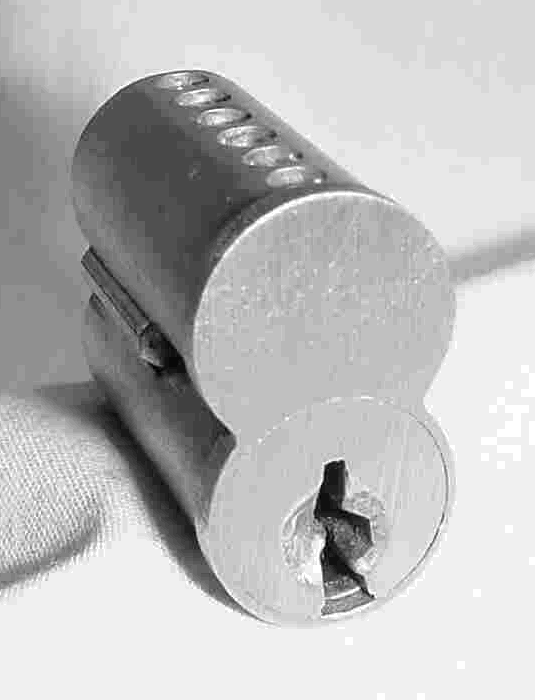
A six-pin interchangeable core with individual chamber capping in an ANSI/BHMA 626 satin chrome finish

An interchangeable core or IC is an adaptable locking key cylinder, which can be rapidly exchanged in the field via the use of specialized "control keys".

== Description ==
Unlike a standard key cylinder, which is accessible for combinating only via locking device disassembly, an interchangeable mechanism relies upon a specialized "control" key for insertion and extraction of the essential (or "core") combinating components. "Small format" interchangeable cores (SFIC) are in a figure-eight shape that is standardized among lock manufacturers. "Large format" interchangeable cores (LFIC) are of varying sizes.

By use of an appropriate control key, interchangeable cores can be extracted from one lock type (bored cylindrical lock, mortise lock, padlock, and so forth) and then installed into another without requiring the removal or disassembly of any single component. These units are readily adapted for master keying systems, and can be set up with spare cores and keys for quick replacement when security is compromised, such as when a key is lost or stolen or when a personnel change takes place. Extracted cores can then be recombinated at a workshop without urgency and placed back into maintenance storage for future use.

== History ==
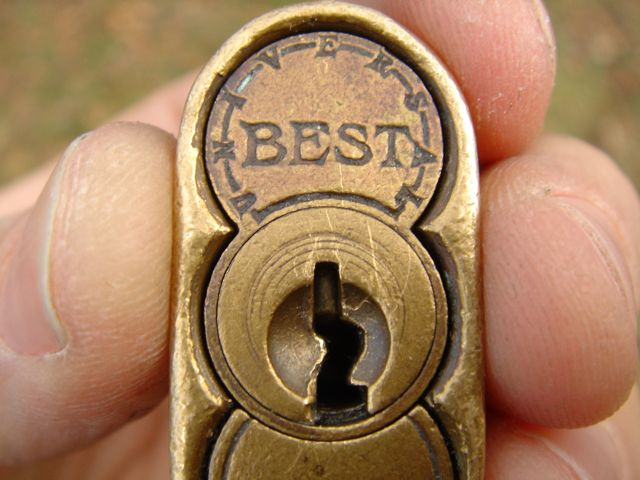
This classic interchangeable core, which features an 'A' keyway, comprises the upper two figure-eight segments in this image. The lowermost segment is part of the lock unit and not an extension of the "small format" core.

The "modern interchangeable core"—and all other cores, as well—actually has its roots in "a bulkier, pedestal-shaped removable configuration" developed in 1919 by Frank Best, then proprietor of Best Universal Lock Company.

== Mechanism ==
Interchangeable cores require a notch at the tip of each key to properly align the peaks and valleys of each blade with the combinating pins in the chambers of the mechanism; as a consequence, these keys are always configured and cut from blade tip to bow. Conversely, conventional cylinders and removable cores use a shoulder near the bow of each key to properly align all peaks and valleys; as a consequence, these keys are always configured and cut from bow to blade tip. As a further consequence of this fundamental difference, neither of these two key types can ever be cross- or master-keyed with the other.

As a benefit to keying from blade tip to bow, a six, or seven-pin interchangeable core key blank can be machined to precisely fit a smaller five-pin system configuration. Although the blade of such keys may be a pin or two longer than need be, this extra length never enters the locking mechanism; therefore, five-, six- and seven-pin interchangeable core systems can be easily integrated to work with one another or to provide different levels of access control within the same system. Conventional cylinder and removable core systems are significantly more limited in this regard since the extra length of their keys must pass through to the inside of the locking mechanism, which is often just not physically possible.

== Small format (SFIC) versus Large format (LFIC) ==
Since entering the market in the mid-1960s, and in spite of its atypical keying configuration and limited availability, the interchangeable core has gradually evolved into a de facto standard for keying interoperability throughout the commercial door hardware industry. Product offerings are no longer limited just to the two originally competing companies (Best Universal Lock and Falcon Lock), and can be optionally specified from all OEM and most aftermarket door hardware brands in North America:

Abus, Alarm Lock, American, Arrow, Best Access, Best Security, BlueWave, Cal-Royal, Corbin-Russwin, CX-5, Dorma, Falcon, GMS, General Lock, Hager, IEI, Ilco, Independence2, InstaKey, K2, Kaba, KSP - Killeen Security Products, Lori, LSDA, Marks, Master, Medeco, Mul-T-Lock, Oak Security Group, Olympus, Omnilock, Onity, Pacific Lock, PDQ, Precision, Saflok, Sargent, Schlage, SDC, Tell, Trans-Atlantic, Von Duprin and Yale either produce their own interchangeable cores or else offer product lines or product options to accommodate such cores by others.

Large format removable cores from manufacturers Assa Abloy, BiLock, Corbin-Russwin, Medeco, Mul-T-Lock, Sargent, Schlage and Yale are not interchangeable with any other make or model. Although similar in appearance when installed, no two actually share exactly the same form or function. More precisely, for example:

Each core from Corbin-Russwin is removed and reinstalled via a partial four-chambered pin section with a unique shear line that rotates into and out of the chassis when the control key with the proper cuts is encountered, and, therefore, is incompatible with all Schlage removable cores, which release and resecure by means of a lateral pin at the back that is controlled by an extra cut at the tip of the key whilst the rest of the key matches any functioning change key or master key combination thereof.

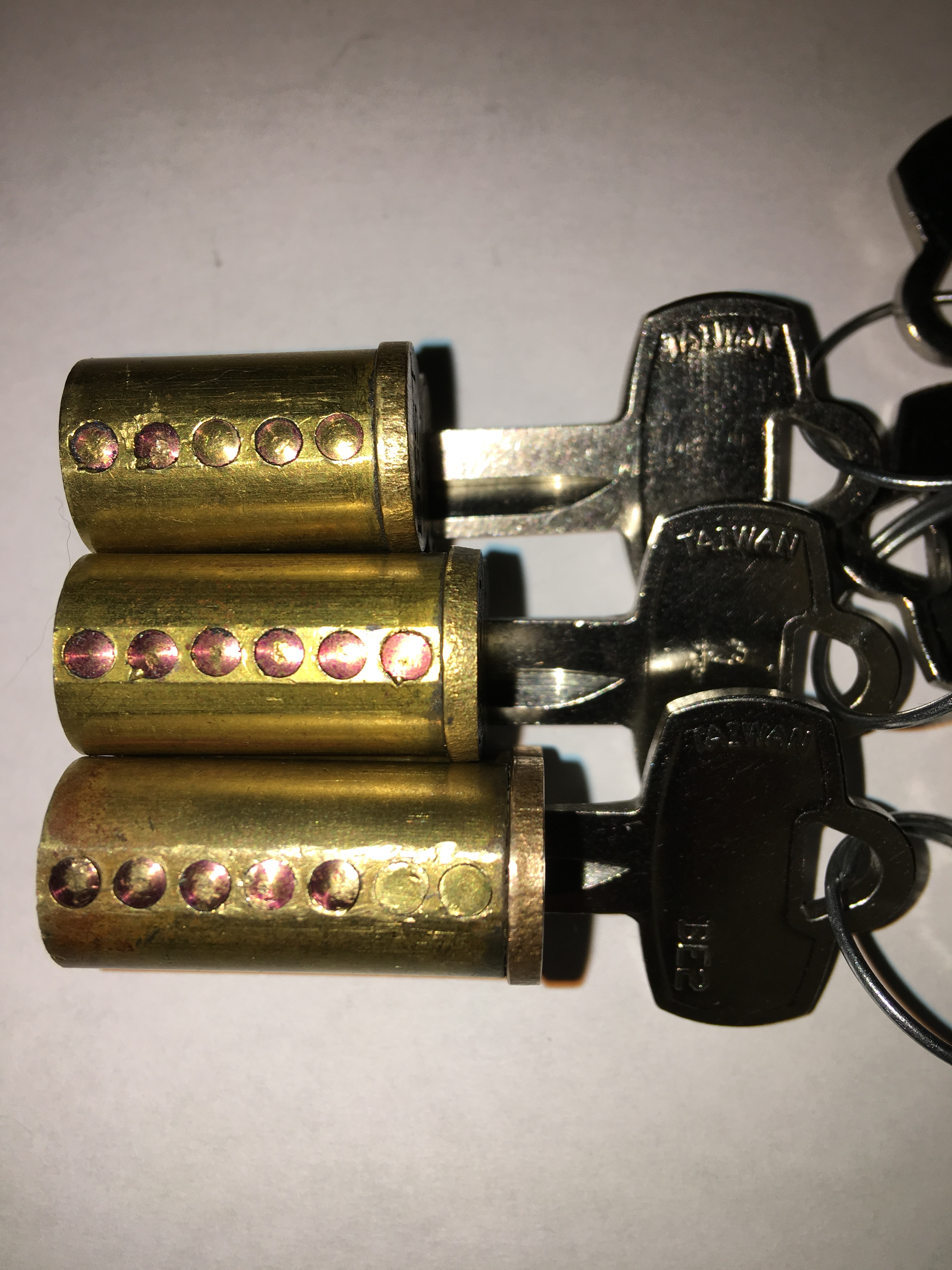
Best branded SFIC core lengths

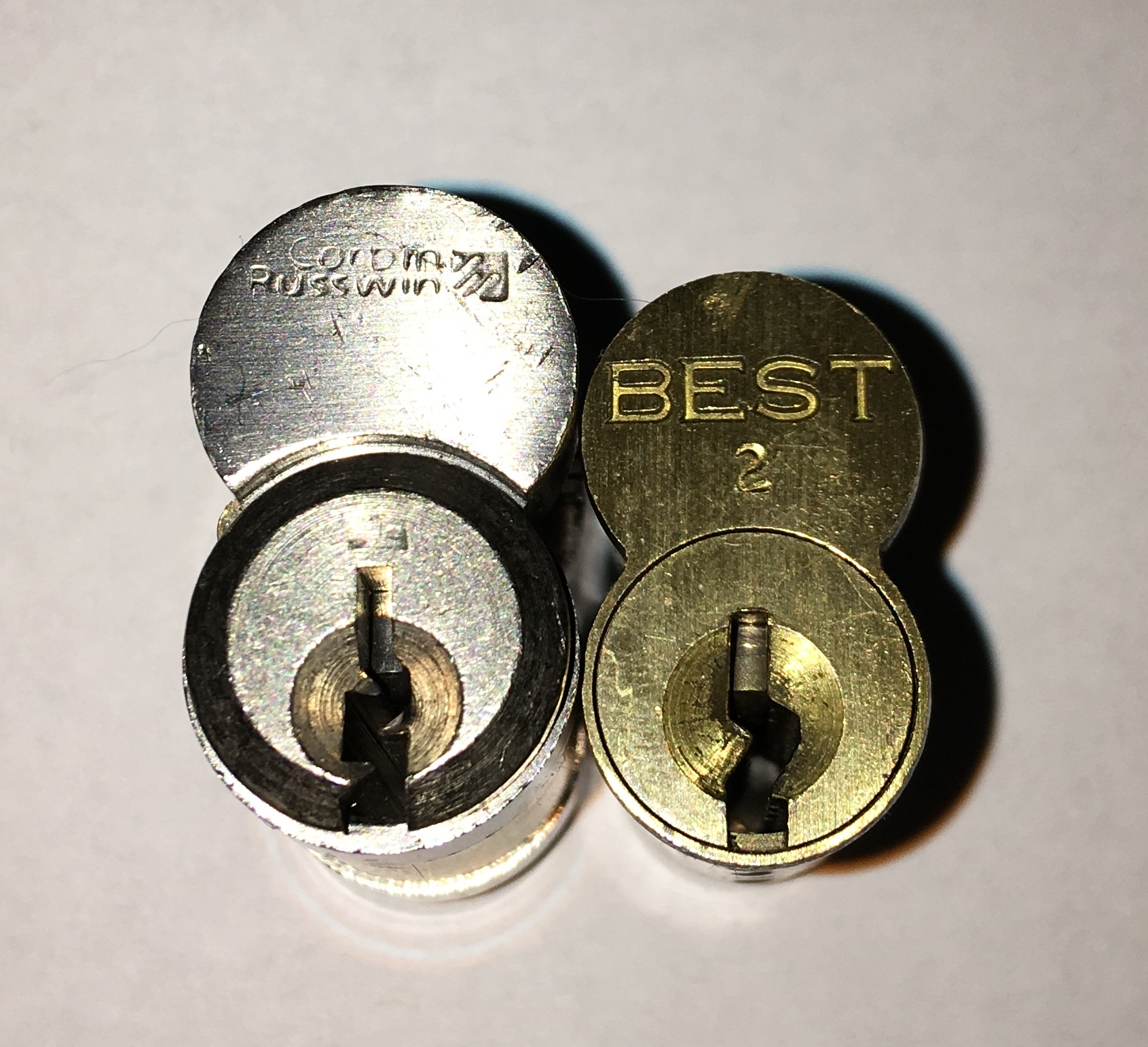
LFIC and SFIC, front view

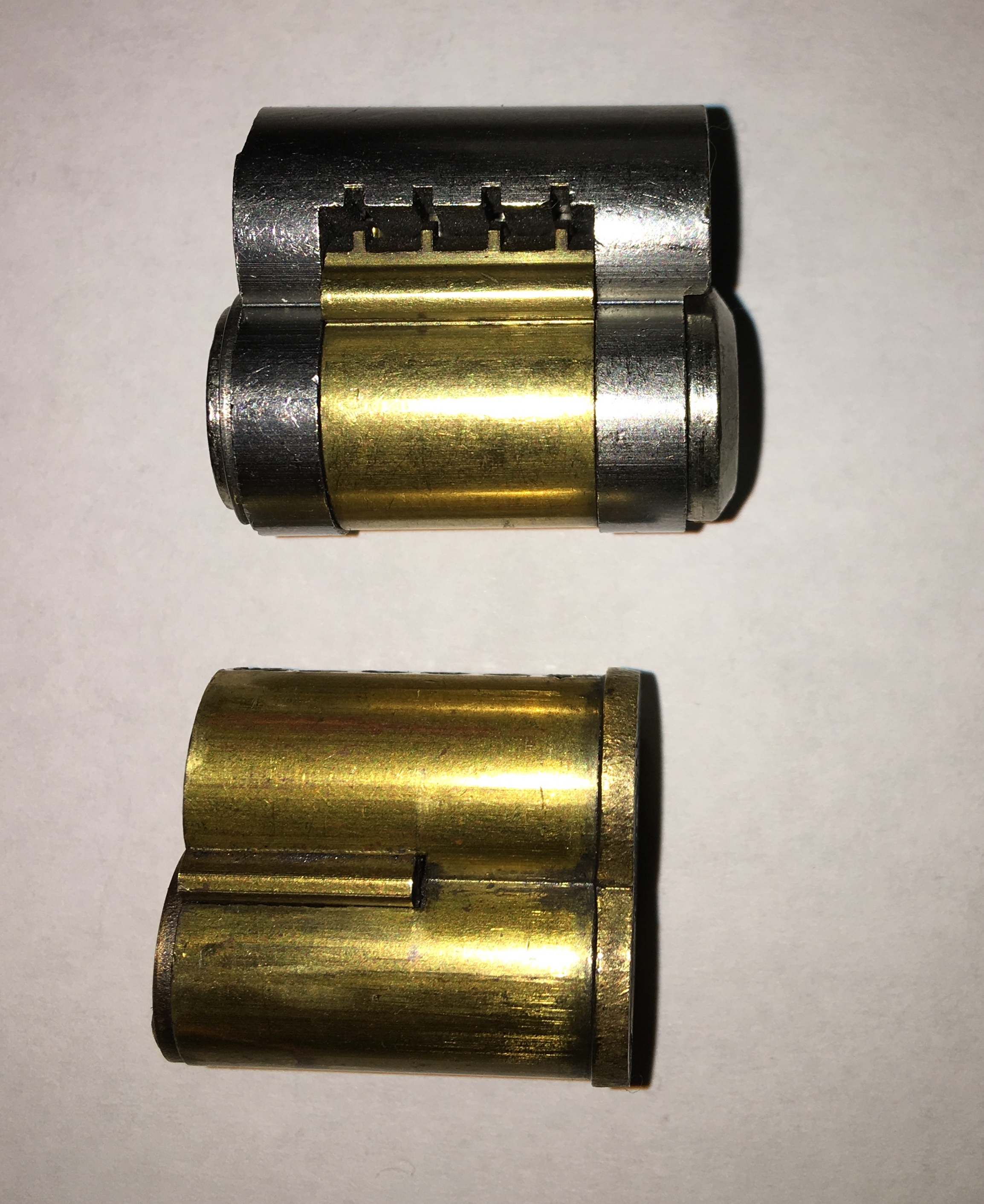
LFIC and SFIC, side view

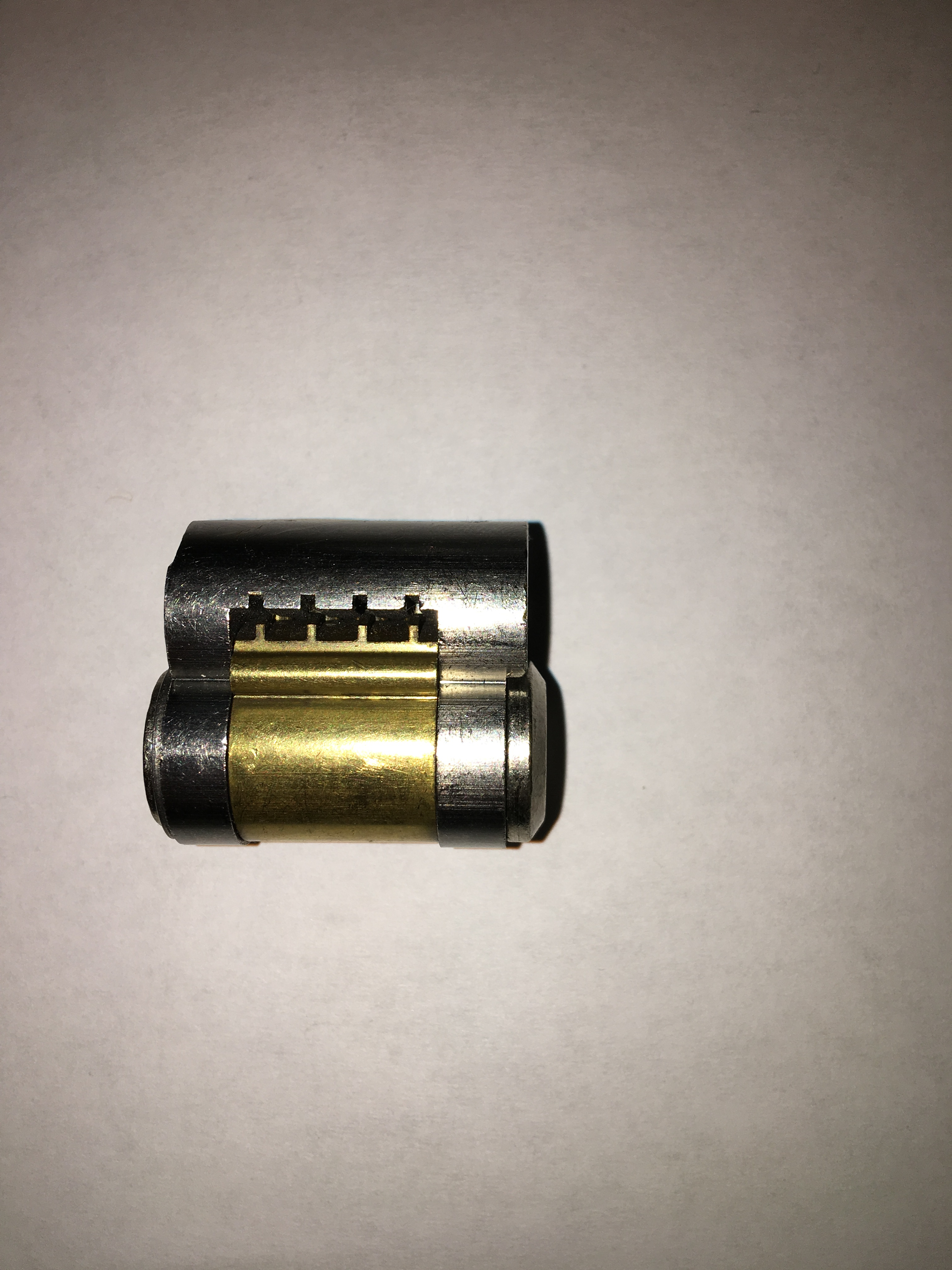
Corbin Ruswin LFIC control sleeve

== Electronic lock core ==
The electronic lock core is the same as the mechanical lock core, which can be directly modified into the existing mechanical lock. Different from the mechanical lock core, the electronic lock core integrates a miniature electronic single-chip microcomputer, there is no mechanical keyhole, and only three metal contacts are retained. The electronic key is used to unlock the lock. The electronic key needs to set the unlocking authority through the software. The authority includes the specific user, the unlocking date and time period, and the list of locks that can be unlocked. Otherwise, the lock cannot be unlocked. It solves the problem that the mechanical lock core is easy to be picked and the lock core is frequently replaced.

Due to its controllability and traceability, more and more electronic lock cores are applied to various security fields.
