= Carolina Dybeck Happe =

Swedish businesswoman

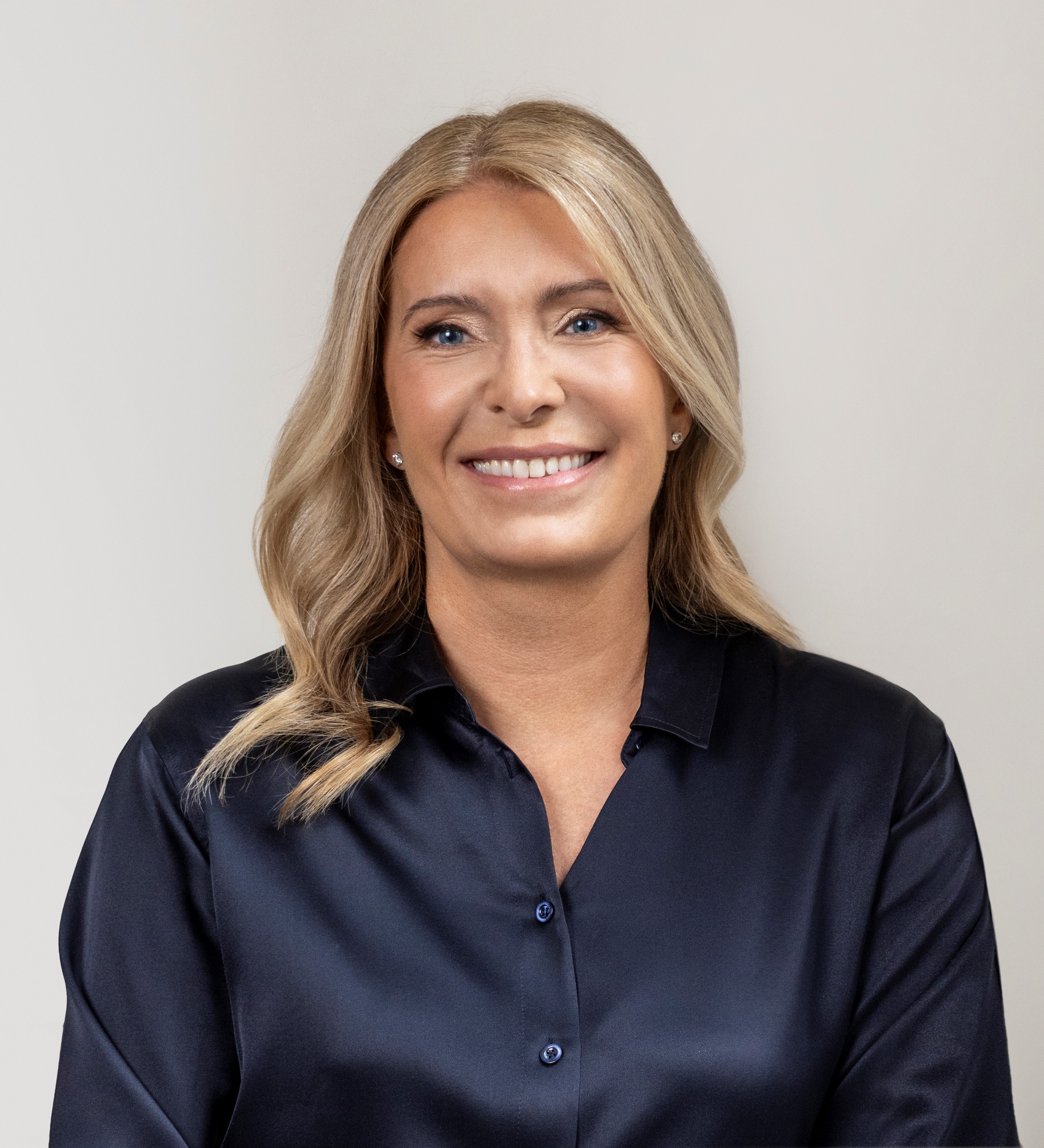
- Dybeck Happe in 2024
- Born: Stockholm, Sweden
- Education: Uppsala University
- Notable work: CFO of General Electric (2020 - 2024)
- Spouse: Philipp Happe
- Children: 2

Carolina Dybeck Happe is a Swedish business executive serving as the chief operations officer (COO) of Microsoft since September 2024.

Previously, Dybeck Happe held the roles of SVP (senior vice president) and chief financial officer (CFO) of General Electric from 2020 to 2024. She was the first outsider and non-American to be appointed CFO of the company, a job that has been described as one of the toughest CFO jobs in corporate America.

Prior to joining GE, she was the CFO of several global corporations including A.P. Møller – Mærsk and ASSA ABLOY.

== Early life and education ==
Dybeck Happe was born and raised in Stockholm, Sweden, the daughter of Sten Dybeck a Swedish businessman and entrepreneur. She holds a Master of Science in Business and Economics from Uppsala University in Sweden.

== Career ==
Dybeck Happe began her career at EF Education First (an international education company) in 1996 where she pursued an international career holding various positions in Russia, Switzerland and USA. In 2002 she joined lock-maker ASSA ABLOY as a regional CFO based in Berlin, Germany. In 2007 she became the EMEA CFO based in London, United Kingdom. After a stint as the group CFO of Trelleborg (a Swedish-based global engineering group) in 2011 she rejoined ASSA ABLOY in 2012 as group CFO and executive vice president based in Stockholm.

In 2019 Dybeck Happe was appointed group CFO, executive vice president, of A.P. Møller – Mærsk A/S (the largest shipping company in the world) based in Copenhagen, Denmark.

In November 2019 it was announced that Dybeck Happe would join General Electric as the group CFO and executive vice president, a role she assumed in March 2020.

In November 2021, General Electric announced its plan to split into three separate public companies focused on the growth sectors of aviation, healthcare, and energy. Dybeck Happe played an important part in the three-way split, including shrinking the company’s debt levels, managing the complexities of the spinoff transactions, and defining the new entities’ capital and tax structures.

In January 2023, GE completed the spinoff of one of the three businesses, GE HealthCare (Nasdaq: GEHC). In March 2023, there were reports about the favorable market reaction to GE’s execution of its plan to date, with one report citing that GE stock is the best performing industrial stock so far this year, having jumped 40%, even as the S&P 500 Industrial Index has slipped 1.7%.

Dybeck Happe officially stepped down as CFO of GE in September 2023 and continued as Senior Vice President and proceeded with GE CEO Larry Culp to launch GE Vernova and GE Aerospace.

Dybeck Happe has been recognized as a top CFO in the US and in Europe. General Electric was also recognized for the best overall investor relations program (large cap) in the US in 2022.

In September 2024, it was announced that Dybeck Happe would be the EVP and Chief Operations Officer at Microsoft. As COO, it was stated that she will be responsible for driving continuous business process improvement and accelerating company-wide AI transformation.

She formerly served on the Supervisory Board of E.ON, a German based European electric utility company, and has previously been on the board of directors of Ericsson, a Swedish telecoms equipment maker, and Schneider Electric, a French-based global specialist in energy management and automation.
