= Gun safe =

Safe for storing firearms

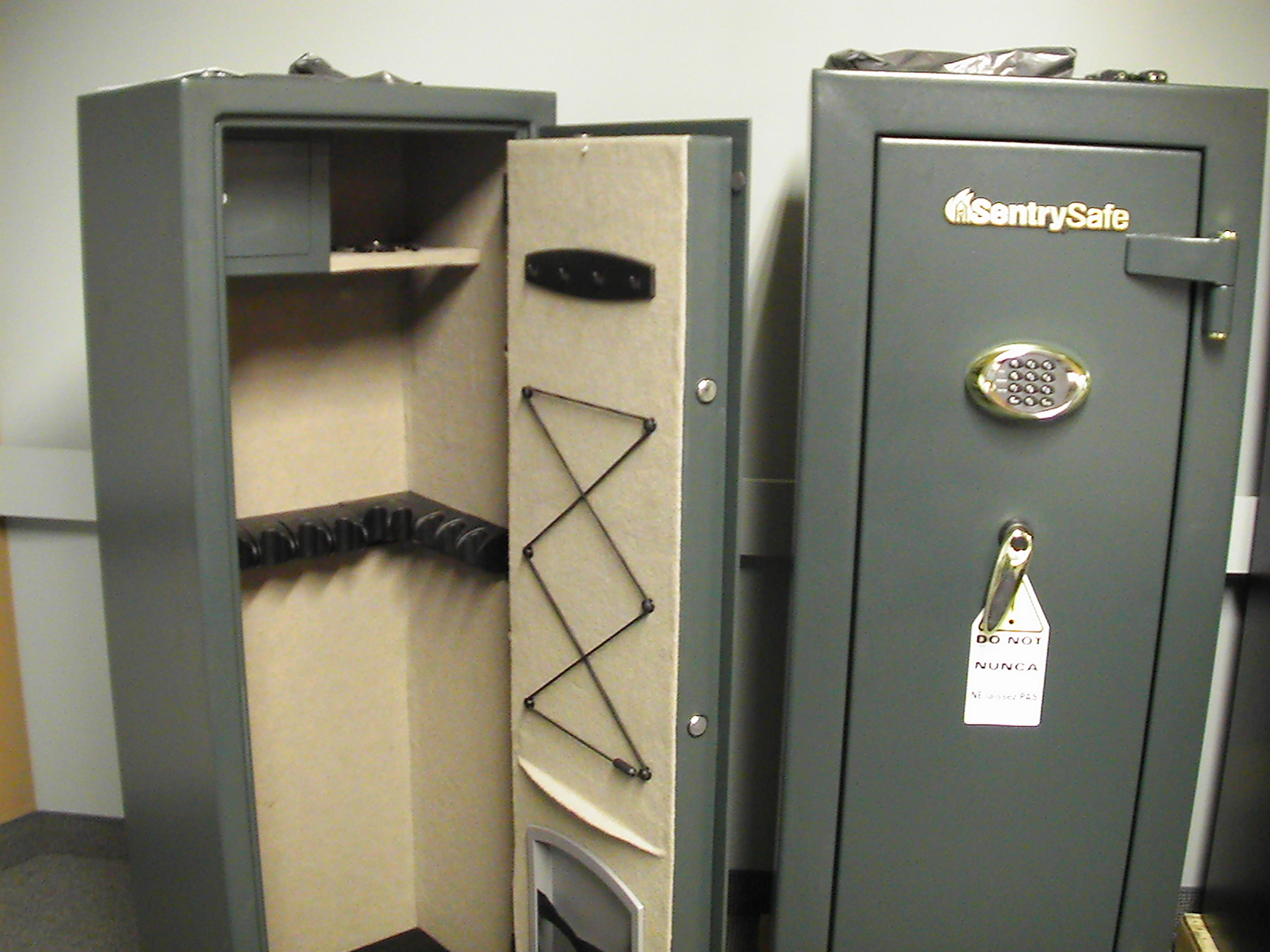
An example (open and closed) of a typical gun safe

A gun safe is a safe designed for storing one or more firearms and/or ammunitions. Gun safes are primarily used to prevent access by unauthorized or unqualified persons (such as children), for burglary protection and, in more capable safes, to protect the contents from damage by flood, fire or other natural disasters.

Access prevention of firearms is mandated by law in many places, necessitating a gun lock, locked gun cabinet or safe, or even a dedicated vault or room with security alarms. Reinforced metal gun safes have largely replaced the gun cabinets made of fine stained wood with etched glass fronts used for display that were commonly used decades ago, although some gun safes are made to resemble such gun cabinets.

== Features ==
Gun safes for visitors at a Czech courthouse

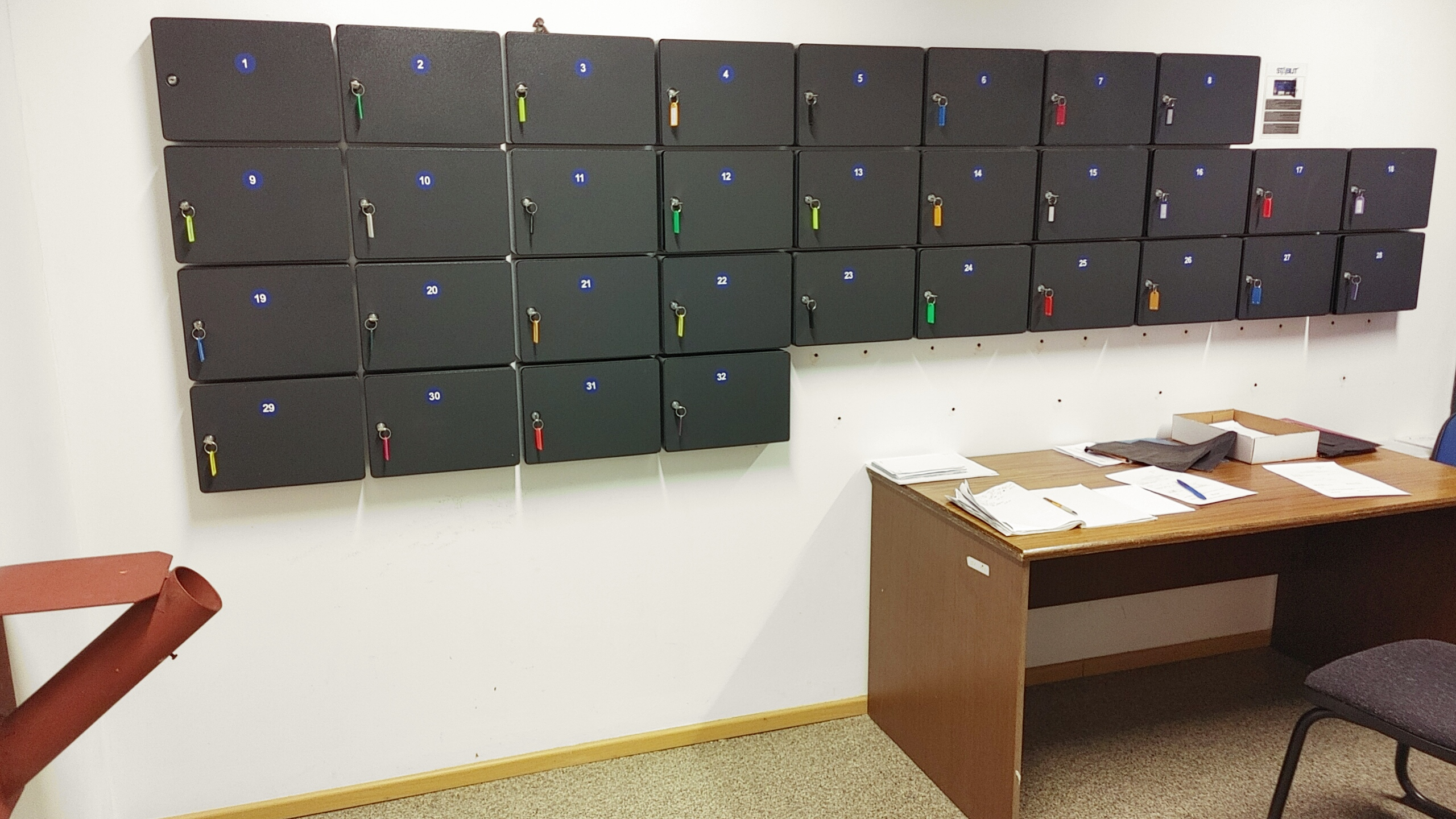
Gun safes for civilian firearms at a courthouse in Prague. It is forbidden to carry any weapons within a courthouse in the Czech Republic. Visitors can leave their firearms at gun safes upon entry, before undergoing airport-style security check.

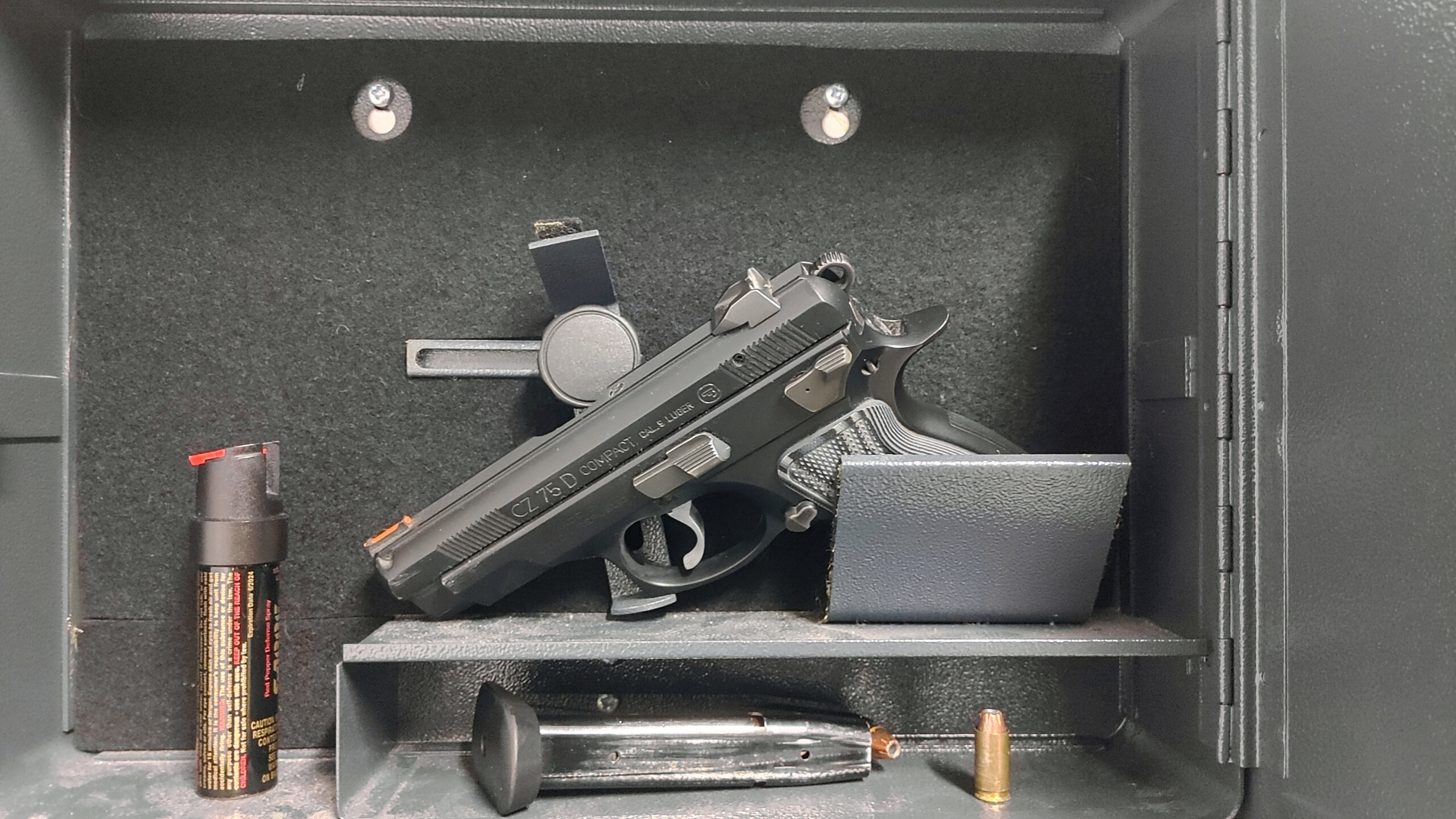
Visitor's unloaded pistol and a pepper spray within a courthouse gun safe

Gun safes may include additional security features such as fire or water protection, combination lock, digital lock, and fingerprint identification.

Electronic locks and mechanical locks are widely used on gun safes, many models of safes incorporate both types of locks.

Due to advances in technology, electronic locks provide comparable security to mechanical locks when it comes to securing firearms. Modern electronic safe locks used advanced encryption algorithms to prevent hacking and unauthorized access, with some safes featuring additional biometric authentication as an added layer of security. Electronic locks provide the advantages of faster access, a keypad is much faster than a dial and RFID locks provide rapid access. Electronic locks allow the end-user to change the password and service the lock themself. The keypad is able to be automatically locked out after too many wrong password attempts, enhancing safety during unauthorized access attempts. The downside of electronic locks is they require a power source to function, some electronic safes are connected to a power outlet, although most use batteries. This makes electronic locks vulnerable to power grid outages, battery failure, and EMP attacks. Electronic lock keypads are less robust than mechanical ones and can wear out over time, this is why some safes with electronic locks include a backup mechanical lock that overrides the electronic lock with a key. Electronic locks also have the disadvantage of potentially being able to be overridden with a factory master code.

Mechanical lock advantages include proven and time-tested reliability, combination lock technology has been around for nearly two centuries. Mechanical locks don't require batteries and are immune to power grid failures & EMP attacks. They have extreme longevity and can easily function well past the average human lifespan, and are more reliable as they don't have circuit boards that can short out or keypads that wear down. The main disadvantage of a mechanical lock is they are significantly slower to open, dialing a four number combination requires good lighting, a steady hand, and patience. Overshooting a number by even a fraction requires starting all over again; opening this type of lock in a high-stress situation, such as a home invasion, can be especially difficult. The other main disadvantage is that changing the combination on a mechanical lock requires hiring a certified safe technician or a locksmith. Some mechanical combination locks have key locks, too, that lock the combination lock dial from turning, thereby precluding casual attempts by anyone with physical access to the safe from trying multiple combinations in the hopes of unlocking the safe.

Some safes use live locking bolt technology and pry resistant metal to ensure the secure protection of its contents against forced entry. Some safes provide only protection against smash and grab burglary and unwanted access from young family members at home or outside, while other safes provide additional protection against fire and flood and other natural disasters.

Vault doors are available for creating walk-in gun safes or vaults in a dedicated room or gun armory in one's home. Such rooms are also sometimes used as a dual-use gun safe or panic room, or even as a dedicated shelter for use in the case of a tornado or hurricane.

Gun safes with a carved wood exterior (furniture safes) serve a primarily decorative purpose and resemble old gun cabinets used for displaying weapons in the past. Design characteristics may include wood veneer and very thick tempered glass.

Some gun safes are designed to be hidden from obvious view. False walls with hinges located at one end of closets are also sometimes used to hide gun safes, although simply installing a gun safe in an existing closet with a door that closes can achieve much of the same advantages to prevent intruders from becoming aware of the existence of a gun safe.

Depending on the place where the gun will be stored, different types of gun safes have appeared: under the bed, bedside, in-wall, vehicle, cabinets, drawers, mirror, and nightstand. But most of them particularly the handgun safes are found by various locksmiths and independent researchers to be unfit for firearm storage and to be best avoided.

== Gun safes in various countries ==
=== Australia ===
All Australian states require that firearms must be locked in steel cabinets or safes, although wooden safes "deemed not easily penetrable" are allowed for Category A and B weapons in all states, apart from Western Australia and Victoria. In most states, the law states that the ammunition (and bolt if readily removed), must be stored either in a separate safe or in a separately locked section of the safe. It is a legal requirement that the safe is fastened to the wall or floor (with exceptions in most states for safes with a mass of greater than 150 kg or 330 lb). In addition, shooters in Western Australia must have double locks on their safes if the swinging edge of the door is greater than 500 mm (20 in) and less than 1,500 mm (59 in), and additional locks are required for safes with a swinging edge greater than 1500 mm. Police may visit and inspect the storage facility before issuing a gun license, and will make random checks to ensure that legislation is being complied with. The Sporting Shooters Association of Australia endorses this policy with its "Secure your gun, Secure your sport" campaign to increase compliance of firearm safety and prevent theft.

Requirements vary when transporting firearms in vehicles in different states. Most require that the gun is hidden from view, and locked so that it is not easily reached by an unauthorised person. Firearms must be unloaded and the ammunition transported in another section of the car.

=== Canada ===
A gun safe is a vault, cabinet, container or room that is difficult to break into. A sheet metal commercial gun safe, or other locked metal container for the preservation of valuables fits the description of “safe” in Black’s Law Dictionary. Safe storage conditions increase in severity from non-restricted class to restricted class and prohibited classes. The firearm must be either trigger locked, or have the bolt removed, or must be stored in a secure locked container, receptacle or room. A restricted or prohibited firearm must be inoperable by means of a keyed trigger locking device. A full-automatic firearm must be further disassembled to remove the bolt or bolt carrier, which must be physically separated from the rest of the pieces.

=== Ireland ===
Any person applying for or renewing their gun licence in Ireland must have a gun safe installed in their home. This was made law under the Firearms (Secure Accommodation) Regulations 2009. Safes must be tested to the British Standard BS7558. Additional requirements including monitored alarms are necessary for those with more than 3 guns.

=== United Kingdom ===
Many gun safes sold in the UK are tested to BS BS7558/92, the British Standard for gun safes. The British Home Office recommends that new cabinets should conform to this standard. Legacy cabinets already in use are usually accepted, at the opinion of the visiting firearms officer, when the license applicant has their home visit and security inspection. Glass fronted cabinets are legal in the U.K, provided the security glazing comply with BS5544 requirements and have no more weak spots than a full steel cabinet.

If citizens do not own a gun safe, according to 'Secure Storage', it is acceptable to remove the firing mechanism from a single firearm or shotgun and store the mechanism in a secure container. It is then required that you lock away the rest of the now-non-functional firearm, or secure it with a "gun cable lock".

Additional security, such as CCTV and/or alarms, may be required in higher risk areas, and also for High Muzzle Energy rifles (over 13,600 joules at the muzzle of the weapon).

A gun room is also acceptable.

For full details of what is acceptable, refer to the latest version of the "Firearms security handbook". 20 January 2021.

=== United States ===
Some gun safes in the United States are tested by Underwriters Laboratories (UL). The least rigorous UL certification for safes is specified in the standard UL 1037 as Residential Security Container (RSC). RSC certification requires that the safe resist for five minutes expert attacks employing tools including screwdrivers, adjustable wrenches, pry bars, punches, chisels and hammers no heavier than 3 lb.

Many gun safe manufacturers state that their gun safe is "DOJ approved". The state of California Department of Justice (DOJ) has required that any gun safe sold in California should be approved by the Regulatory Gun Safe Standards. This DOJ standard has now become a common rating for the classification of gun safes. However, in 2012, a report appeared in Forbes written by the investigative attorney and physical security specialist Marc Weber Tobias, presenting the results of his investigation into the quality of the security provided by eleven different models among three leading brands of gun safes sold in the U.S. through many retail outlets. Eight models from one of the brands are said to conform to the DOJ standard. Tobias reported that he and his colleagues found that all eleven models could be opened with one of a variety of simple implements and techniques, including bouncing and rapping, or insertion of paperclips, wires, drinking straws, screwdrivers, or brass strips that can be purchased from a hardware store. Four of the models were unlocked by a three-year-old child. (It was a fatality resulting from such an occurrence that led to the investigation.) When Tobias reported their findings to the manufacturers and retailers of the "safes", no useful dialog or corrective action resulted. Tobias concluded that the DOJ "Standards are woefully inadequate and do not address any of the issues that we found in any of the gun safes that we tested. If the Standards do not cover a method of entry, then they are meaningless."

Fireproof gun safes have an UL classification, and depending on the build of the gun safe, the inside must not get warmer than a certain temperature during a certain period of time. A common rating for gun safes is "350-1 hour" or "350-2 hour", which means that when the safe is in a fire, the inside will not get warmer than 350 degrees Fahrenheit for 1 or 2 hours. It has been noted that fireproof safes may be insecure against unauthorized entry.

== Potential risk ==
Although rare, large gun safes may pose a risk to small children who could accidentally lock themselves inside one. To minimize this risk, gun safes are usually bolted down, both to deter crime, as well as to eliminate the possibility of the safe tipping over upon a person opening the door; the heaviest portion of many safes being the door.

It is advised that a gun safe is installed in a place where there is little risk of fire, which is not too humid and where there is little risk of theft. Humidity also poses a risk to the life of guns and gun safe, but this can be prevented with the use of a dehumidifier, to avoid moisture.

== See also ==
- Firearm rack
- Gun safety
- Safe
