= KRD =

KRD may refer to:

- .krd, the Internet geographic top-level domain for Kurdistan Region of Iraq
- Karad railway station, Maharashtra, India, station code
- Key rate duration in fixed-income attribution
- Key retainer device
