= Key duplication =

Process of creating a new key based on an existing key

Video showing the process of cutting a key

Process of advanced security key copying on professional duplicator.

Key duplication refers to the process of creating a key based on an existing key. Key cutting is the primary method of key duplication: a flat key is fitted into a vise in a machine, with a blank attached to a parallel vise, and the original key is moved along a guide, while the blank is moved against a blade, which cuts it. After cutting, the new key is deburred: scrubbed with a wire brush, either built into the machine, or in a bench grinder, to remove burrs which, were they not removed, would be dangerously sharp and, further, foul locks.

Different key cutting machines are more or less automated, using different milling or grinding equipment, and follow the design of early 20th century key duplicators.

Key duplication is available in many retail hardware stores and as a service of the specialized locksmith, though the correct key blank may not be available. More recently, online services for duplicating keys have become available.

In the UK, the majority of the mobile locksmiths will have a dual key cutting machine on their van. The key duplication machine will be able to cut both cylinder and mortise keys, as these are the most popular types of keys in circulation. However, very few will carry a laser key cutting machine, which is sometimes needed to cut high security keys.

Certain keys are designed to be difficult to copy, for key control, such as Medeco; while others are simply stamped "Do Not Duplicate" to advise that key control is requested, but in the US, this disclaimer has no legal weight.

== Other methods ==
Rather than using a pattern grinder to remove metal, keys may also be duplicated with a punch machine (the Curtis key clipper is a recognised example). The key to be duplicated is measured for the depth of each notch with a gauge and then placed into a device with a numeric slider. The slider is adjusted to match the corresponding measured depth and a lever is depressed, which cuts the entire notch at once. As the lever is raised the key automatically advances to the next indexed position and the slider is adjusted appropriately to the next measured depth. This cycle is continued until the key is complete.

Duplicating keys by this process is more labor intense and requires somewhat better trained personnel. However, keys made in this fashion have clean margins and the depth of the notches are not subject to wear induced changes encountered when heavily worn keys are duplicated using a pattern grinder. Keys may also be made in this fashion without an original as long as the depth of each notch and the type of key blank are known. This is particularly useful for institutions with a great number of locks for which they do not want to maintain a wide variety of archived copies. Code books or on-line resources may be used to program the key clipper/punch settings from the code stamped on the lock, listed in the owner's manual, or available from the vehicle's VIN.

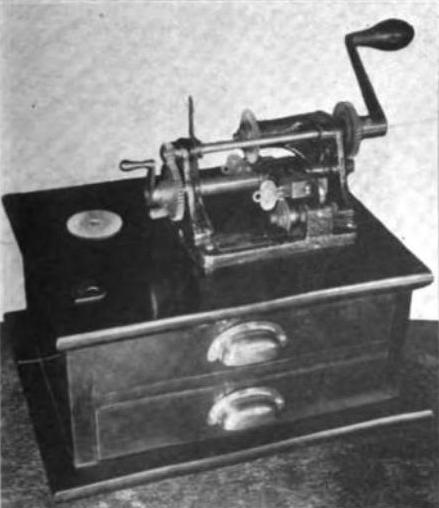
Mechanical key duplicating machine invented in 1917

A machine permitting rapid duplication of flat metal keys, which contributed to the proliferation of their use during the 20th century, may have been first invented in the United States in 1917 (image to the left):

The key to be duplicated is placed in one vise and the blank key to be cut in a corresponding vise under the cutting disk. The vise carriage is then into such position by means of a lateral-feed clutch that the shoulders of both the pattern and blank keys just touch the guide disk and cutter respectively. The lateral-feed clutch on the top of the machine is then thrown, and the vertical feed rod released into action and power applied through the combination hand-crank power wheel on the right of the machine, until the cutter has passed over the entire length at the blank. A duplicate of the pattern key is obtained in about one minute.

— "Man And His Machines", The World's Work XXXIII:6 April 1917

In recent years, dual key cutting machines have come on to the market, enabling cutting of both mortice and cylinder keys on one machine. These machines are primarily manufactured in the Far East and save a key cutter a significant amount of money compared with using two separate dedicated machines.

== Do not duplicate key ==
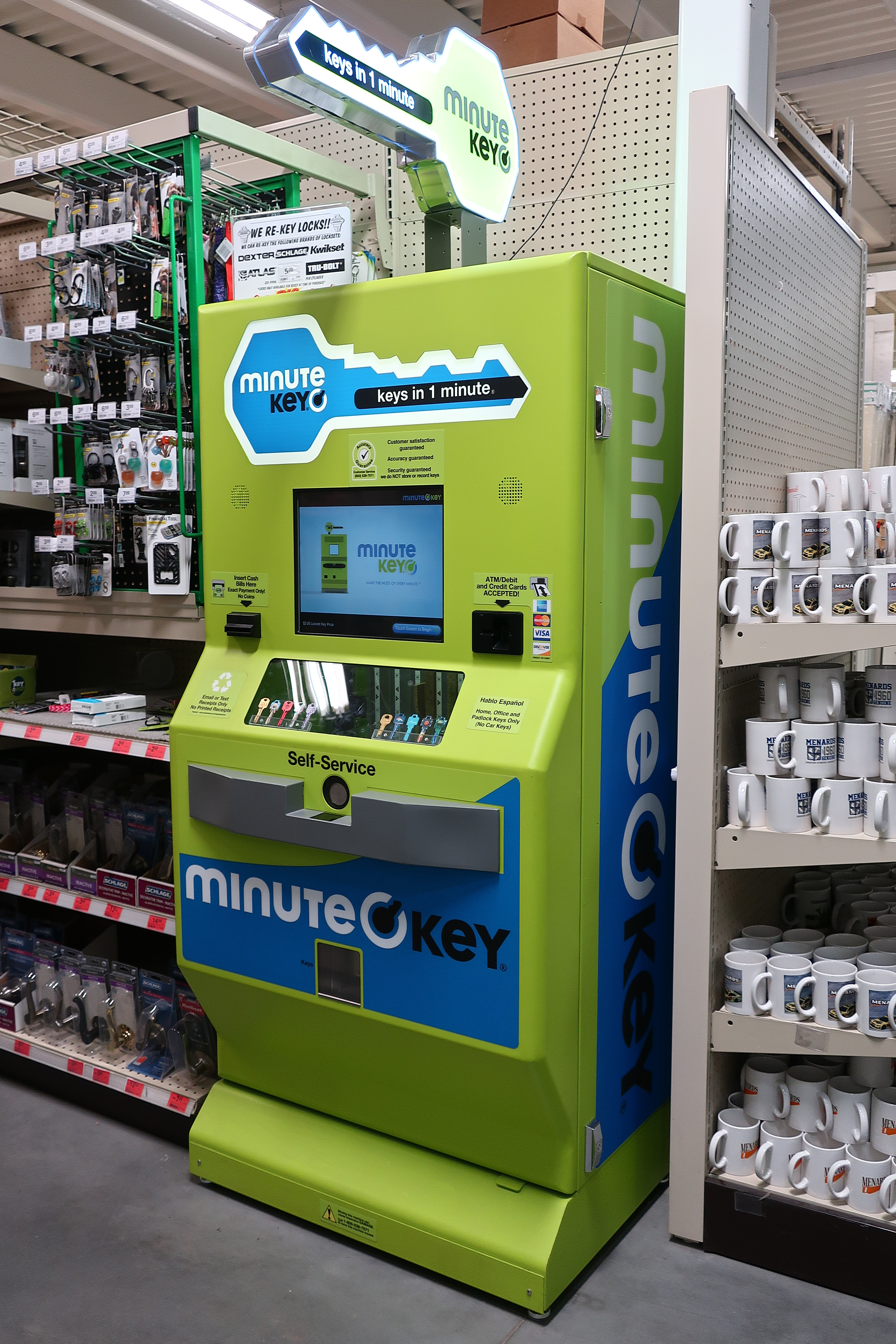
A minuteKEY fully-automated self-service key duplication kiosk at a Menards in Gillette, Wyoming

A "do not duplicate" key (or DND key, for short) is one that has been stamped "do not duplicate", "duplication prohibited" or similar by a locksmith or manufacturer as a passive deterrent to discourage a retail key cutting service from duplicating a key without authorization or without contacting the locksmith or manufacturer who originally cut the key. More importantly, this is a key control system for the owner of the key, such as a maintenance person or security guard, to identify keys that should not be freely distributed or used without authorization. Though it is intended to prevent unauthorized key duplication, copying DND keys remains a common security problem.

=== U.S. restrictions ===
There is no direct legal sanction in the US for someone who copies a key that is stamped do not duplicate (unless it is an owned key), but there are patent restrictions on some key designs (see "restricted keys"). The Associated Locksmiths of America, ALOA, calls DND keys "not effective security", and "deceptive because it provides a false sense of security." 18 U.S.C. § 1704 deals with United States Post Office keys, and 18 U.S.C. § 1386 deals with United States Department of Defense keys.

== Restricted key ==
A restricted key is a type of key that is designed to limit access to a specific area or object. These keys are typically used in high-security environments, such as government facilities, military bases, and certain businesses that require strict access control.

Restricted keys are unique in that they are only able to be duplicated by authorized individuals or locksmiths who have the proper identification and authorization to do so. This helps to ensure that the key cannot be copied or used by unauthorized individuals.

Some common examples of restricted key systems include master key systems, where a single key can open multiple locks within a building, and key control systems which allow for precise tracking of key usage and access control. Overall, restricted keys are an important tool for maintaining security and controlling access to sensitive areas.

A restricted keyblank has a keyway for which a manufacturer has set up a restricted level of sales and distribution. Restricted keys are often protected by patent, which prohibits other manufacturers from making unauthorized productions of the key blank. In many cases, customers must provide proof of ID before a locksmith will cut additional keys using restricted blanks. Some companies, such as Medeco High Security Locks, have keyways that are restricted to having keys cut in the factory only. This is done to ensure the highest amount of security. These days, many restricted keys have special in-laid features, such as magnets, different types of metal, or even small computer chips to prevent duplication.

Another way to restrict keys is trademarking the profile of the key. For example, the profile of the key can read the name of the manufacturer. The advantage of a trademark is that the legal protection for a trademark can be longer than the legal protection for a patent. However, usually not all features of the profile are necessary to create a working key. By removing certain unnecessary features, a non restricted profile can be derived, allowing the production and distribution of non restricted key blanks.
