= Firearm rack =

Rack used for storing firearms

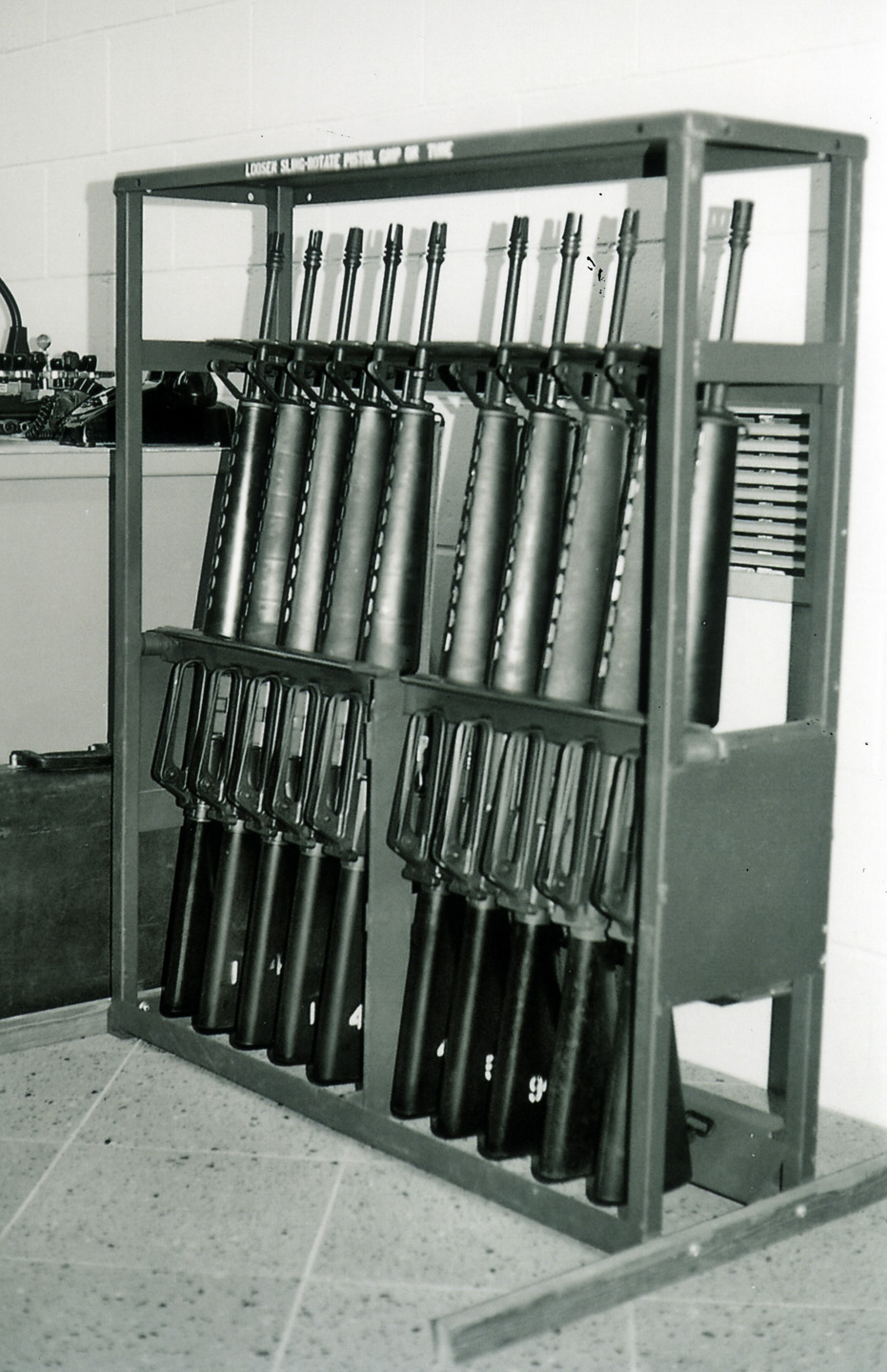
An M12 Small Arms Storage Rack, a United States military gun rack designed to hold ten M16 rifles

A gun rack, also known as a firearm rack, rifle rack, or arm rack, is a rack used for storing firearms such as long guns and handguns. They can be used for regular storage or display.

Gun racks are often designed to hold a gun pointing up, with its stock or grip touching the bottom of the rack. Sections on the rack may be intended as slots to secure the gun and keep it secure in place, often placed at the barrel, barrel shroud, or stock. Gun racks typically have locks to prevent theft or improper use.

Gun racks can be mounted onto vehicles to carry firearms; indeed, the shooting brake originated as a hunting vehicle designed to carry guns in this fashion. Aftermarket gun racks can be mounted onto vehicles such as all-terrain vehicles, side-by-sides, military vehicles, SWAT vehicles, tractors, and other vehicle types.

== See also ==
- Gun safe
