= Besam (Assa Abloy) =

Company

Besam was an international supplier and manufacturer of automatic entrance equipment for commercial, health care and residential buildings owned by Assa Abloy. The product portfolio included automatic doors, automatic swing doors, sliding doors and revolving doors, as well as air curtains and dedicated service and maintenance.

Besam was headquartered in Landskrona, Sweden, in offices which are part of the Assa Abloy group since. Assa Abloy Entrance Systems has 1500 employees at 26 subsidiaries around the globe and representation in another 55 countries. The company has production units in the United States, Czech Republic and China. U.S. manufacturing is based in Monroe, North Carolina.

Besam originated as a manufacturer of automatic doors for the healthcare sector in 1962, and expanded its portfolio with automated sliding door systems in the 1970s as well as revolving doors in 1985. Due to the rapidly growing demand for automatic door solutions, especially in retail and transportation industries, Besam kept on expanding its portfolio. Since 2002 the Besam group of companies have been wholly owned by Assa Abloy, among other well knows brands, such as Crawford, Albany and Megadoors.
