= Medeco =

American lock manufacturer

Medeco, a subsidiary of the Swedish Assa Abloy Group, is a lock manufacturer located in Roanoke County, Virginia, United States.

== History ==
Medeco traces its origins to the Mechanical Development Company, a tool and die shop, founded in mid-1950s by Paul A. Powell, Roy C. Spain and Roy N. Oliver in the Glenvar area of Roanoke County. Roy Oliver served as the CEO of Medeco through the early 1980s.

In the 1960s, Roy Spain perfected a lock featuring angled key cuts with elevating and rotating pin tumblers, and he submitted the design to the U.S. Patent Office. As part of a promotional campaign, he advertised that anyone who could pick this lock would receive $50,000. Only a detective from New York City succeeded; accomplishing the feat a single time but failing on subsequent attempts.

The design ultimately proved to be resistant to the widely used forms of attack of that time. Capitalizing on this invention and related patents, the Medeco company was established in 1968. The name was formed from the constituent words of the "Mechanical Development Company".

The Swedish based lock manufacturer Assa Abloy Group acquired Medeco in 1998.

Medeco currently has over 250 employees, still operating out of facilities in Roanoke County.

== Design ==
Medeco's lock design features lock pins that are "chisel tipped" which can be rotated only by keys with correspondingly angled cuts. This serves to increase the difficulty of key reproduction. A slot along the length of the pin causes the sidebar to drop once the pin has been rotated to its correct orientation. The off-centre chisel tip also allows 2 different offsets to the pin. The theoretical number of unique key combinations is over two million when using a lock with six pins, six heights, three rotational positions, and two pin tip angles.

== Vulnerabilities ==
A group of researchers presented a paper on defeating Medeco's locks at the 2007 DEF CON conference. Using computing power and mechanical know-how, the group developed a practical means of deploying a "bump pick" attack. At the time, company officials said they were looking to verify the claim, while also announcing a new version of the lock. The research eventually led Medeco to remove most claims from its own press that had indicated immunity to bump and pick attacks.

The very next year, several new methods of defeating Medeco locks were presented by Marc Tobias and Tobias Bluzmanis at the DEF CON 2008 and HOPE 2008. A simultaneous public release of a book provided further details of the attacks. The findings included the use of plastic keys to facilitate unauthorized duplication of Medeco M3 and Medeco Biaxial keys, and a means of deploying a bump attack against Medeco M3 locks.
