= Key control =

Methods for ensuring authorized use only

Key control refers to various methods for making sure that certain keys are only used by authorized people. This is especially important for master key systems with many users. A system of key control includes strategies for keeping track of which keys are carried by which people, as well as strategies to prevent people from giving away copies of the keys to unauthorized users. The former may be as simple as assigning someone the job of keeping an up-to-date list on paper. A more complex system may require signatures and/or a monetary deposit.

== Levels ==
Preventing unauthorized copies typically falls into one of the following five levels.

- Level 5 (lowest): ordinary unrestricted keys. This level relies on the honor system. Users are instructed not to make copies or loan keys and trusted to comply. This is common for private residences.
- Level 4 (low): unrestricted keys marked "Do Not Duplicate". These keys can theoretically be copied anywhere, but many stores will refuse to copy them. This is a very low-level deterrent which ALOA calls "deceptive because it provides a false sense of security".
- Level 3 (medium): restricted keys. These keys are not generally available at retail outlets and often can only be obtained through a single source. The supplier has their own rules in place to prevent unauthorized duplication.
- Level 2 (high): patented keys. By definition, patented keys are restricted. They also have the added feature of being protected by patent law. Anyone who sells such a key without permission of the patent holder could face financial penalties.
- Level 1 (highest): factory-only patented keys. These keys cannot be cut locally. In addition to the restrictions above, users must send an authorization request to the factory to have additional keys cut and strict records are kept of each key.

None of these levels can protect against a user who loans a key to someone else and then falsely claims that the key was lost. Additional methods of key control include mechanical or electronic means. Electronic key control systems use serialized key assignments housed in a centralized database to allow for better tracking of each key made.
