= Marc Weber Tobias =

American locksmith

- Born: United States
- Education: University of Nebraska-Omaha; Creighton Law School
- Occupation: Physical security researcher
- Known for: "Insecurity engineering"

Marc Weber Tobias is an American lawyer, writer, and researcher specializing in security systems, particularly locks and physical security mechanisms. He is known for his work on lock designs and what he calls insecurity engineering.

== Early life and education ==
From an early age, Tobias developed an interest in disassembling objects to understand their functionality, which led him to focus on analyzing and testing the vulnerabilities of locks and security systems.

Tobias earned a bachelor's degree from the University of Nebraska-Omaha in 1970 and a Juris Doctor from Creighton Law School in 1973.

== Career ==
In 2010, Tobias began investigating gun safe security following the accidental shooting of Ryan Owens, a three-year-old in Vancouver, Washington. The firearm involved was stored in an inexpensive safe provided by the county sheriff's office. Tobias identified a design flaw that could allow unauthorized access, prompting him to evaluate the security of various low-cost gun safes. He found that several safes priced between $75 and $200, manufactured in China were easily opened. Methods used included gently bouncing the safe while lifting a corner with a finger and employing simple tools like paper clips, wires, and straws to breach the locks. As a result, Tobias filed a federal class action lawsuit against Stack-On Corporation in 2012, which was ultimately settled by the manufacturer in the plaintiff's favor.

Tobias co-founded the Security Engineering Laboratory at the University of Pittsburgh with Tobias Bluzmanis, where students study both technical and ethical considerations in discovering security vulnerabilities. At the University of Pittsburgh's Swanson School of Engineering, he teaches methods for detecting flaws in locks and other products, a field he refers to as insecurity engineering.

Tobias has worked for many lock manufacturers in the U.S., Europe, and the Middle East. He has also worked with federal, state, and local law enforcement agencies. He serves as the co-principal of Securitylaboratories.org. Tobias is also a member of UL's technical standards panel for locks, safes, and alarms, where he contributes to the development of testing and certification guidelines.

Tobias is a member of several professional associations, such as the ALOA Security Professionals Association, American Society for Industrial Security, FBI InfraGard, and the International Association for Identification (IAI). He also serves as a technical advisor to the Association of Firearm and Tool Mark Examiners (AFTE).

As an attorney, Tobias works at Investigative Law Offices, P.C. His practice focuses on technical fraud investigations and providing consultancy on security issues, including lock bypass techniques and analyzing security system flaws.

== Writing ==
In 1971, Tobias authored the first edition of Locks, Safes, and Security: An International Police Reference which is considered as the bible for law enforcement and crime laboratories. The book's second edition was published in 2000 which was reviewed by several security periodicals that included ASIS Security Management, and the Journal of Forensic Identification.

In 2008, Tobias co-authored Open in Thirty Seconds: Cracking One of the Most Secure Locks in America which describes methods to defeat Medeco locks.

In 2024, his eighth book, Tobias on Locks and Insecurity Engineering, was published by Wiley. The book discusses the historical development of lock engineering and examines the progression of lock technologies, from traditional mechanical systems to modern digital codes. It discusses how increasing complexity in lock design can introduce new vulnerabilities. The book was reviewed by the Security Management magazine and described as a "comprehensive engineering reference."

== Bibliography ==
- Tobias, Marc W. (1971). Locks, Safes, and Security: An International Police Reference
- Tobias, Marc W. (1972). Pre-trial Criminal Procedure: A Survey of Constitutional Rights
- Tobias, Marc W. (1974). Police Communications
- Tobias, Marc W. (1975). A Field Manual of Criminal Law and Police Procedure
- Tobias, Marc W. (2000). Locks, Safes, and Security: An International Police Reference (2nd edition)
- Tobias, Marc W. (2008). Techno Security's Guide to Securing SCADA
- Tobias, Marc W.; Bluzmanis, Tobias (2008). Open in Thirty Seconds: Cracking One of the Most Secure Locks in America
- Tobias, Marc W. (2024). Tobias on Locks and Insecurity Engineering
