= Mul-T-Lock =

Israeli lock manufacturer

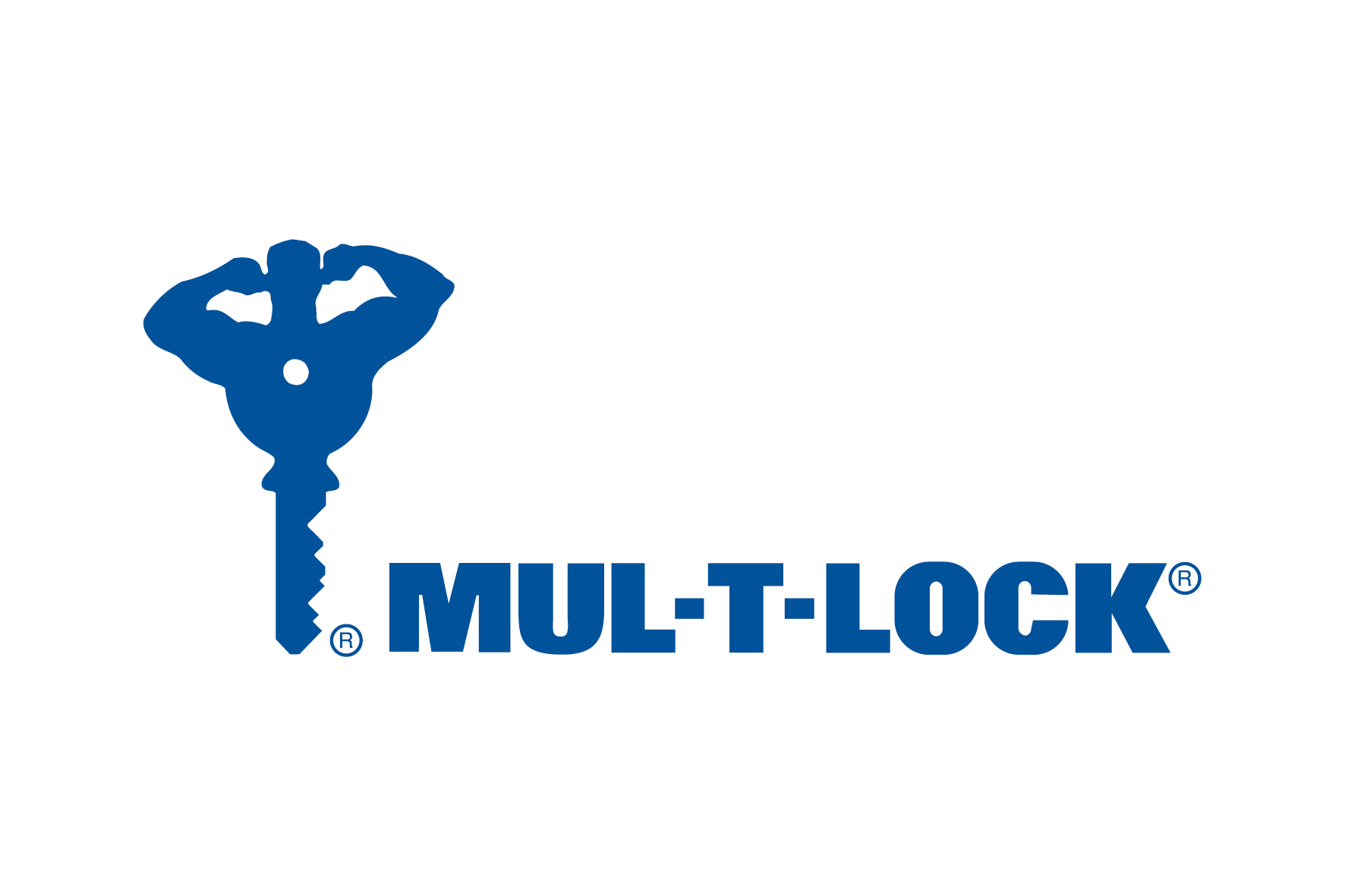
- Type: Subsidiary
- Industry: Locks, Home Security, Burglar Alarms, Door Viewers, Window Locks, Padlocks, Keys, Cylinders, Electro Mechanical Security, Access Control Systems
- Founded: 1973; 53 years ago
- Headquarters: Yavne, Israel
- Products: WatchLock, AS Cylinder Lock, ENTR, SMARTair Genesis, CLIQ
- Parent: Assa Abloy

Mul-T-Lock is an Israeli company that develops and sells padlocks, combination locks, and related security products. It was founded in 1973 by Moshe Dolev and Avraham Bahry and is a subsidiary of Assa Abloy. Four years later, in 1977, Mul-T-Lock introduced the telescopic pin technology and entered the cylinders market.

== History ==
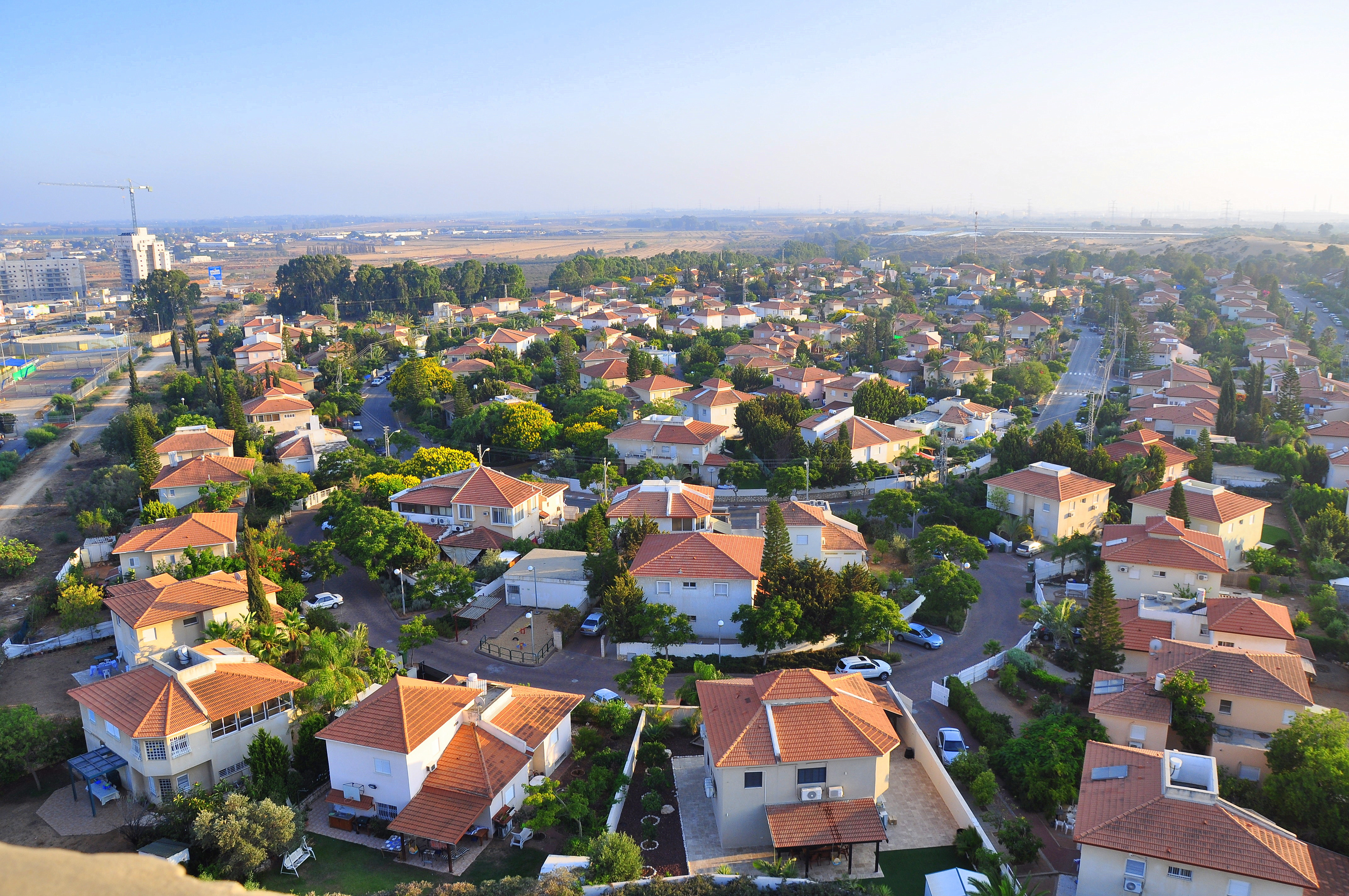
Yavne, Israel, headquarters of the company

Mul-T-Lock was established in 1973, with the invention of the 4-way lock. In 1976, its marketing efforts expanded internationally in 1976. As the company experienced growth, it expanded its manufacturing facilities.

In 1987 Mul-T-Lock opened its first business unit in the United States and its second manufacturing plant in Israel.

Mul-T-Lock launched the Interactive patented platform in 1992 and expanded with new European selling units and entered the Asia Pacific market.

In 2000, Mul-T-Lock became part of the ASSA ABLOY Group, a manufacturer of access solutions. The company introduced the MT5 + high-security premium cylinder platform and the KC5 key-cutting machine in 2006. It expanded its network of distributors and authorized locksmiths to over 80 countries.

== Product categories ==
- Mechanical locks
- Electromechanical access control systems
- Patented locks
- Cylinders
- Padlocks
- Locks and lock cases
- Vehicle protection
- Master key systems
- Key management systems
- Industrial locks
- Key cutting machines
