= Assa Abloy =

Swedish physical security conglomerate

Assa Abloy AB
- Type: Public
- Traded as: Nasdaq Stockholm: ASSA B
- ISIN: SE0007100581
- Industry: Manufacturing and services
- Founded: 1994; 32 years ago
- Headquarters: Stockholm, Sweden
- Key people: Johan Hjertonsson (chairman); Nico Delvaux (president and CEO)
- Products: Locks, automatic and security doors
- Revenue: ▲140.7 kr billion (2023)
- Operating income: ▲22.18 kr billion (2023)
- Net income: ▲13.64 kr billion (2023)
- Total assets: ▲196.3 kr billion (2023)
- Total equity: ▲91.64 kr billion (2023)
- Number of employees: 61,000 (2023)
- Website: assaabloy.com

Assa Abloy AB is a Swedish company that sells products and services related to locks, doors, gates, and entrance automation, as well as controlling access and confirming identities with keys, cards, tags, mobile, and biometric identity verification systems.

The company was formed in 1994, when Assa AB was separated from Swedish security firm Securitas AB. Shortly thereafter, Assa AB merged with the Finnish high security lock manufacturer Abloy Oy (based in Joensuu, a then subsidiary of the Finnish company Wärtsilä). The company was introduced to the Stockholm Stock Exchange later the same year. Assa Abloy has since made over 300 acquisitions including Yale, Chubb Locks, Medeco in the United States, Mul-T-Lock in Israel and Fichet-Bauche in France. Its two largest shareholders are Investment AB Latour and Melker Schörling AB.

== Name ==
Assa Abloy was founded at the merger of the two companies Assa and Abloy in 1994. Assa stands for August Stenman Stenman August. The name Abloy comes from a contraction of the Swedish Finnish bilingual name Ab Låsfabriken Lukkotehdas Oy, meaning literally Corp. Lock Factory Lock Factory Corp. (first Corp. and Låsfabriken from Swedish, last Lukkotehdas and Corp. from Finnish). In 1919 the company was renamed Aktiebolag Lukko Osakeyhtiö, understood word for word as Corp. Lock Corp.

== History ==
=== Founding, growth and development ===
Assa Abloy was formed in 1994, through the merger of Swedish firm ASSA and Finnish high security lock manufacturer Abloy. The company was introduced to the Stockholm Stock Exchange later the same year.

From a regional company with 4,700 employees in 1994, Assa Abloy has become a global group with 61,000 employees in 2023. The company has grown its revenue by more than 9% annually and operates now in over 70 countries.

Revenue in 2022 was SEK 120,793 M. Sales revenue in 2023 was 140,716 M. The increase of 16% was a third due to the effects of the exchange rate.

== Brands ==
- ASSA, Sweden (namesake) (August Stenman Stenman August (founded by August Stenman))
- ABLOY, Joensuu & Helsinki, Finland (namesake) (AktieBolag Lukko OsakeYhtiö)
- Albany, United States (founded in Albany, NY)
- Alcea, France
- Amarr, United States (founded by Abraham & Morris Brenner)
- Ameristar, United States
- Arrow, United States
- Baron, Canada
- Besam, Sweden (founded by Bertil Samuelsson)
- Biosite, United Kingdom
- Carlisle Brass, United Kingdom (founded in Carlisle, United Kingdom)
- Carpro, Sweden
- Caldwell, United States (founded by William Caldwell)
- Centrios, United States
- Corbin, Italy (named after Philip & Frank Corbin)
- Corbin Russwin, United States (founded by Philip & Frank Corbin, Henry Russell, Cornelius Erwin)
- Control ID (Identification), Brazil
- Crawford, United States (founded by Fred Crawford)
- Ditec, Italy
- D&D Technologies, Australia (founded by Neil Dunne & David Doyle)
- Effeff Fritz Fuss, Germany ('founded by Fritz Fuss)
- Elsafe, Norway
- FAB, Czech Republic (Faborsky & Salda founded by Alois Faborsky)
- Fargo Electronics, United States (named after William Fargo)
- Fichet, France (founded by Alexandre Fichet)
- Flexiforce, Netherlands
- Forte, Peru
- Global Reach, United Kingdom
- Guoqiang, China (founded by Song Guoqiang)
- Hanchett Entry Systems (HES), United States (founded by Lee Hanchett)
- HID (Hughes Identification Devices, founded by Howard Hughes), United States
- HKC Security, Ireland (Harte, Kelly & Company(1993-2000) founded by Peter Harte & Gerry Kelly)
- IDS, South Africa (Inhep Digital Security founded by ' Roy Innes & Anthony Pitout)
- Ikon, Germany
- Janam Technologies, United States
- Jerith, USA (named afterJerry & Judith Shchwartz)
- JPM, France (founded by Jean Pierre Maquennehen)
- KAD (Korea Auto Door), South Korea
- Kelley, USA (founded by Gary Kelley)
- Keso, Switzerland (Keller & Sohn, founded by Ernst Keller)
- Kwikset, United States
- LaFonte, Brazil
- L-Door, Belgium (founded by Luc de Bischop in Liedekerke)
- Level Home, United States
- Lips, The Netherlands ('founded by Jacobus Lips)
- Litto, Belgium (founded in th Belgian Littoral)
- Lockwood (named after Henry Lockwood), Australia
- Lorient, United Kingdom (named after Lorient, France)
- Luxer One, United States
- MAB, Italy (founded by Domenico Masellis in Bologna)
- MAUER, Bulgaria (named after Gunter Mauer)
- Medeco, United States (Mechanical Development Company)
- MR, Portugal ('M'Rodrigues SA founded by Manuel Rodrigues)
- MegaDoor, United States
- Metaflex Door, The Netherlands
- Mercor, Poland
- Mul-T-Lock, Israel
- Nassau Door, Denmark (named after Nassau, Germany)
- National Hardware, United States
- NEMEF, The Netherlands(NEderlandsche MEubelsloten Fabriek)
- Norton, United States (founded by Lewis Norton)
- ODIS, Chile (Obras De Ingeneria Santiago)
- Olimpia Hardware, Costa Rica (named after Olympia, Greece)
- Papaiz, Brazil (founded by Luigi Papaiz)
- Pfister, United States (founded by William Pfister)
- Phillips, Mexico (founded by Fernando Phillips)
- Planet, Switzerland
- Point Fort Fichet, France (founded by Alexandre Fichet)
- PTI Security Systems, United States (Preferred Technology Incorporated)
- Rixson, United States (founded by Oscar Rixson)
- Ruko, Denmark (founded by Rudolf Koreska)
- Sargent (founded by Joseph Sargent), United States
- Securitech, United States
- Silvana, Brazil
- SKIDATA, Austria
- Spence Doors, Australia (founded by Robert Spence)
- St Guchi, Malaysia (named after Guccio Guchi)
- Sure-Loc Hardware, United States
- Tesa, Spain (Talleres des Eskoriaza Sociedad Annonima, founded in Eskoriaza)
- Traka, United Kingdom
- TrioVing, Norway (named after Petter & Wilhelm RosenVinge)
- Trojan, United Kingdom (named after Troy)
- Udinese, Brazil (named after Udine, Italy)
- Uhlmann & Zacher, Germany (founded by Martin Uhlmann & Marc Zacher)
- Union, Kenya
- Union, United Kingdom
- Valli, Italy (founded by Pasquele Valli)
- Vachette, France (founded by Louis & Emile Vachette)
- VingCard Elsafe, Norway (named after Petter & Wilhelm RosenVinge)
- Wallace & Wallace, Canada (founded by Lowell Wallace)
- Wallace Perimeter Security, Canada (founded by Lowell Wallace)
- Wesko Locks, Canada (founded by Florian Westwinkel as Westwinkel Kompany)
- Weiser, Canada, United States
- Yale, except for United States and Canada (founded by Linus Yale)
- Yeti, Poland

=== Acquisitions ===
In May 1999, the acquisition of Effeff Fritz Fuss in Germany enabled Assa Abloy to enter the electromechanical lock market. Assa Abloy also acquires Mul-T-Lock in Israel, a manufacturer of high security locks. Assa Abloy doubles in size in 2000, when it acquires the global lock group Yale Intruder Security. In the same year, Assa Abloy acquires HID, adding electronic identification to its product portfolio.

In April 2002, Assa Abloy Group acquired Besam, a Swedish company specialized in automatic pedestrian doors. Another important acquisition for the group was Fargo Electronics, a company which develops systems for safe issuing of credit, bank, debit and ID cards. This was followed by other acquisitions such as Baodean in China and Irevo in South Korea in 2007.

In 2009, the Italian door automation manufacturer, Ditec, was bought. Important acquisitions were also made in September 2011, with the purchase of Crawford and Flexiforce. A number of purchases followed in 2012. In April 2012 Traka, a company specialising in key and asset management was acquired. The group also acquired Albany Door Systems, a manufacturer of high speed industrial doors. November 2013 came with the purchase of the Polish fire and security door manufacturer Mercor SA, Ameristar USA, and Amarr.

In 2018, Assa Abloy acquired Lorient, a UK based designer and manufacturer of high performance door sealing systems and HKC, an Irish alarm and cloud based monitoring solutions manufacturer.

In December 2018, Assa Abloy acquired Luxer One, a package locker business in the US.

In January 2019, Assa Abloy agreed to acquire KEYper Systems, a manufacturer of electronic and mechanical key management systems based in Harrisburg, North Carolina, to be run as a business unit of Traka.

In February 2020, Assa Abloy acquired the UK-based, 140-strong biometric access and workforce management technology business, Biosite.

In May 2021, Assa Abloy acquired Sure-Loc, the leading supplier of residential locks and associated hardware in the US.

In September 2021, Assa Abloy acquired the Hardware and Home Improvement ("HHI") division of Spectrum Brands for $4.3 billion. HHI has a varied portfolio of products, including patented SmartKey technology and electronic, smart and biometric locks. Key brands include Kwikset, Baldwin, Weiser, Pfister and National Hardware. HHI is headquartered in Lake Forest, California with some 7,500 employees worldwide and has manufacturing facilities in the United States, Mexico, Taiwan, China, and the Philippines.

In June 2022, Caldwell, a manufacturer of fenestration hardware for window manufacturers based in Rochester, NY, was acquired by Assa Abloy for an undisclosed sum.

In August 2022, ALCEA, a company specializing in access control solutions and catering to various vertical markets, was acquired by Assa Abloy Global Solutions.

In December 2022, Assa Abloy acquired the New York-headquartered provider of rugged handheld mobile computers and readers, Janam Technologies.

On September 8, 2021, Assa Abloy announced that it had signed a definitive agreement to acquire Spectrum Brands' HHI division, including Kwikset, among other brands, for a purchase price of $4.3 billion. The transaction was initially expected to close in the fourth quarter of 2021. On June 20, 2023, the purchase of the "HHI" division of Spectrum Brands was completed, this included the Kwikset brand.

In October 2023, Assa Abloy acquired New York-headquartered manufacturer of high-security mechanical and electronic door hardware products in the U.S., Securitech Group Inc.

In September 2024, Assa Abloy acquired SKIDATA from the Kudelski Group.

In late 2024, Irish subsidiary HKC launched the first online portal for clients and customers.

=== Cooperation with colleges and universities ===
The company is a Corporate Partner in the Stockholm School of Economics partner program for companies that contribute financially to the college and works closely with regard to research and education.

== Gallery ==
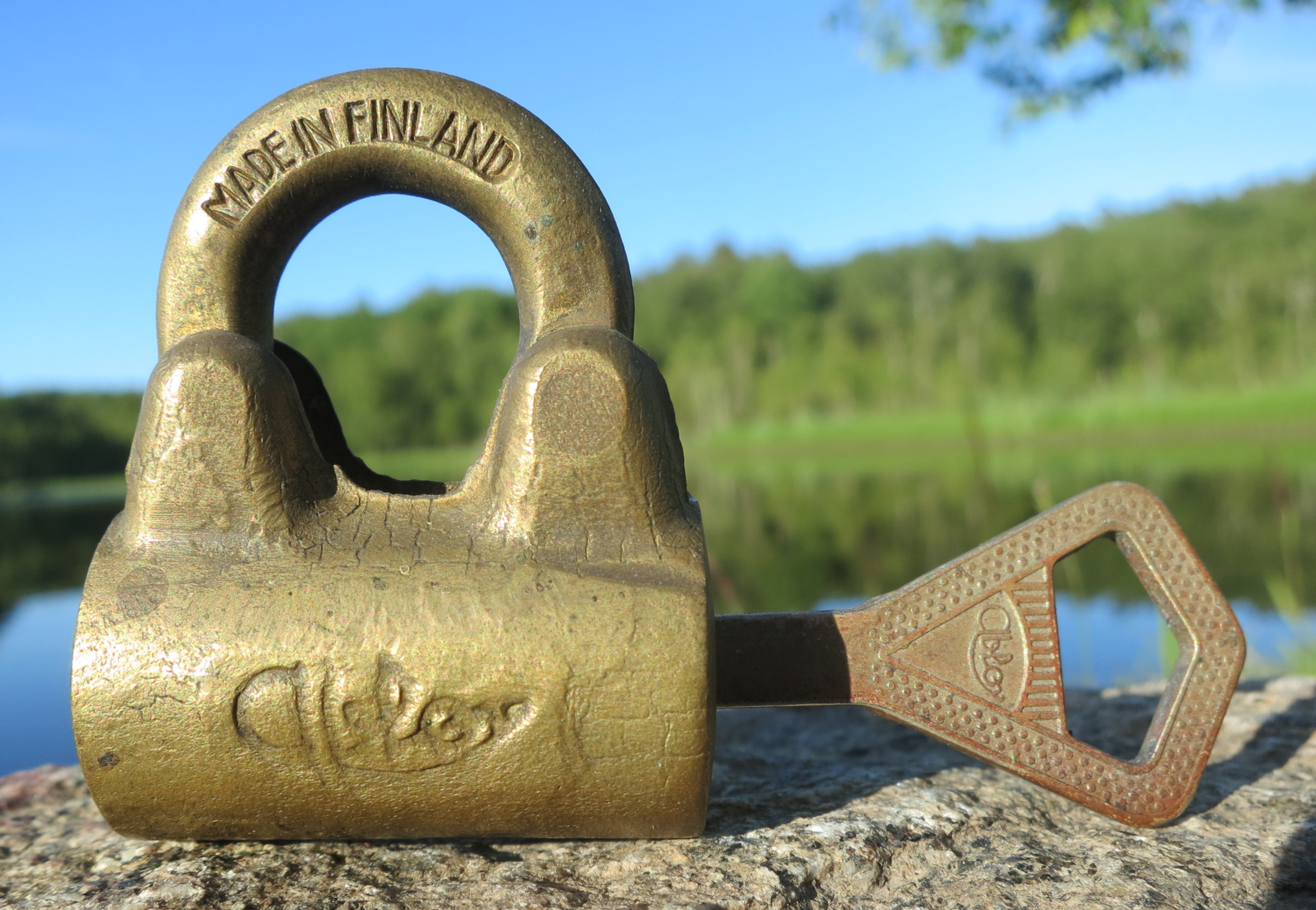
Mid-20th-century padlock by Abloy Oy, which merged with Assa AB in 1994 to become Assa Abloy AB.

== See also ==
- List of Swedish companies
