= Kensington Security Slot =

Anti-theft system for computer equipment

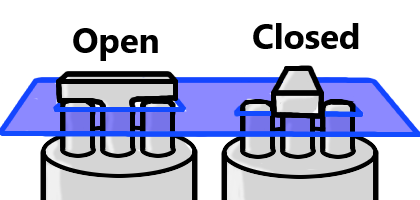
Kensington Security lock: unlocked, locked

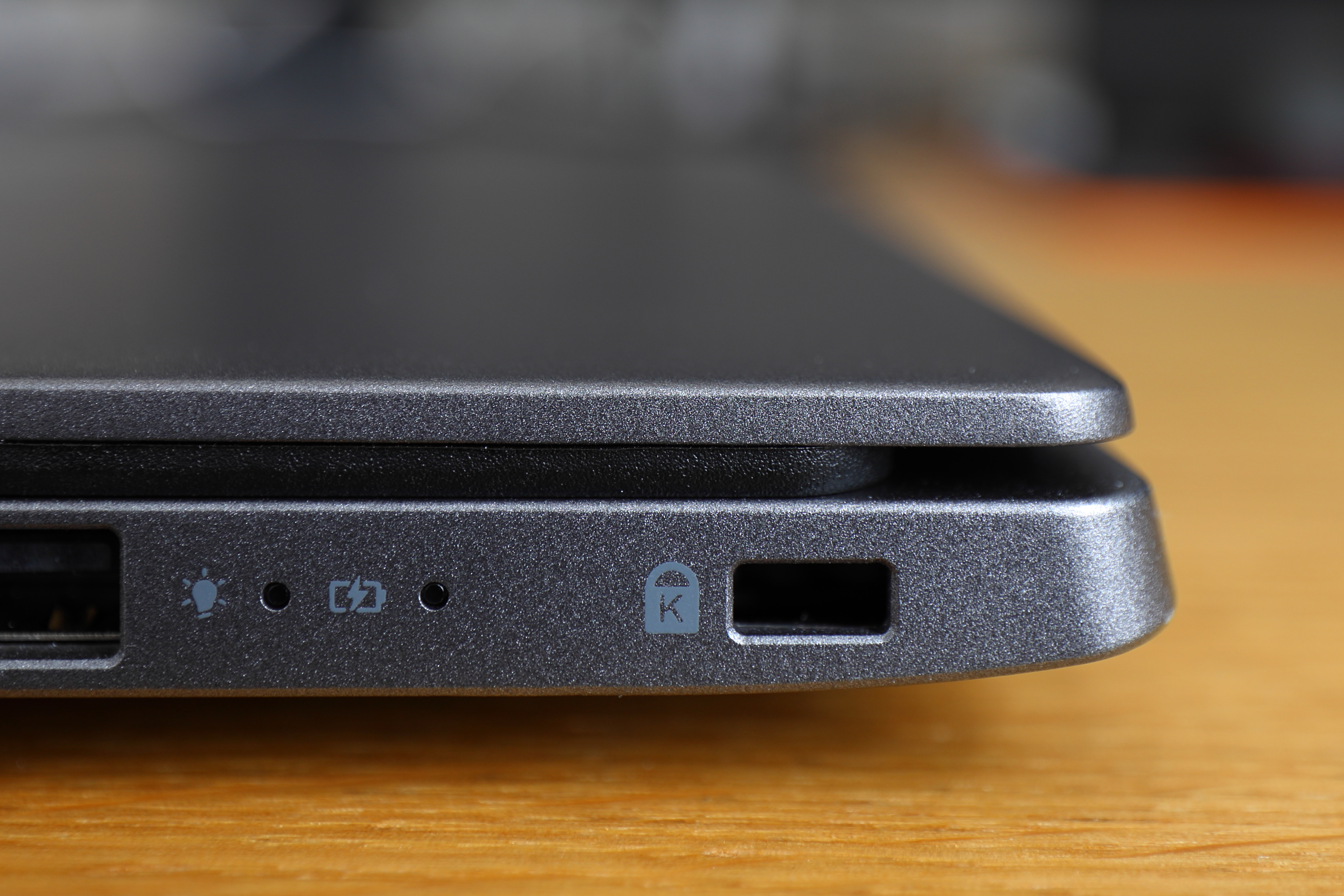
The Kensington Security Slot is the rightmost opening on the side of an Acer Swift 3 laptop computer

The Kensington Security Slot (also called a K-Slot or Kensington lock) is an anti-theft system for hardware electronics such as notebook computers, computer monitors and others. It is a small, metal-reinforced hole used for attaching a lock-and-cable apparatus. It is produced by Kensington Computer Products Group.

== Development ==
Designed in the mid 1980s and patented by Kryptonite in 1999–2000, assigned to Schlage in 2002, and since 2005 owned and marketed by Kensington Computer Products Group.

== Design ==
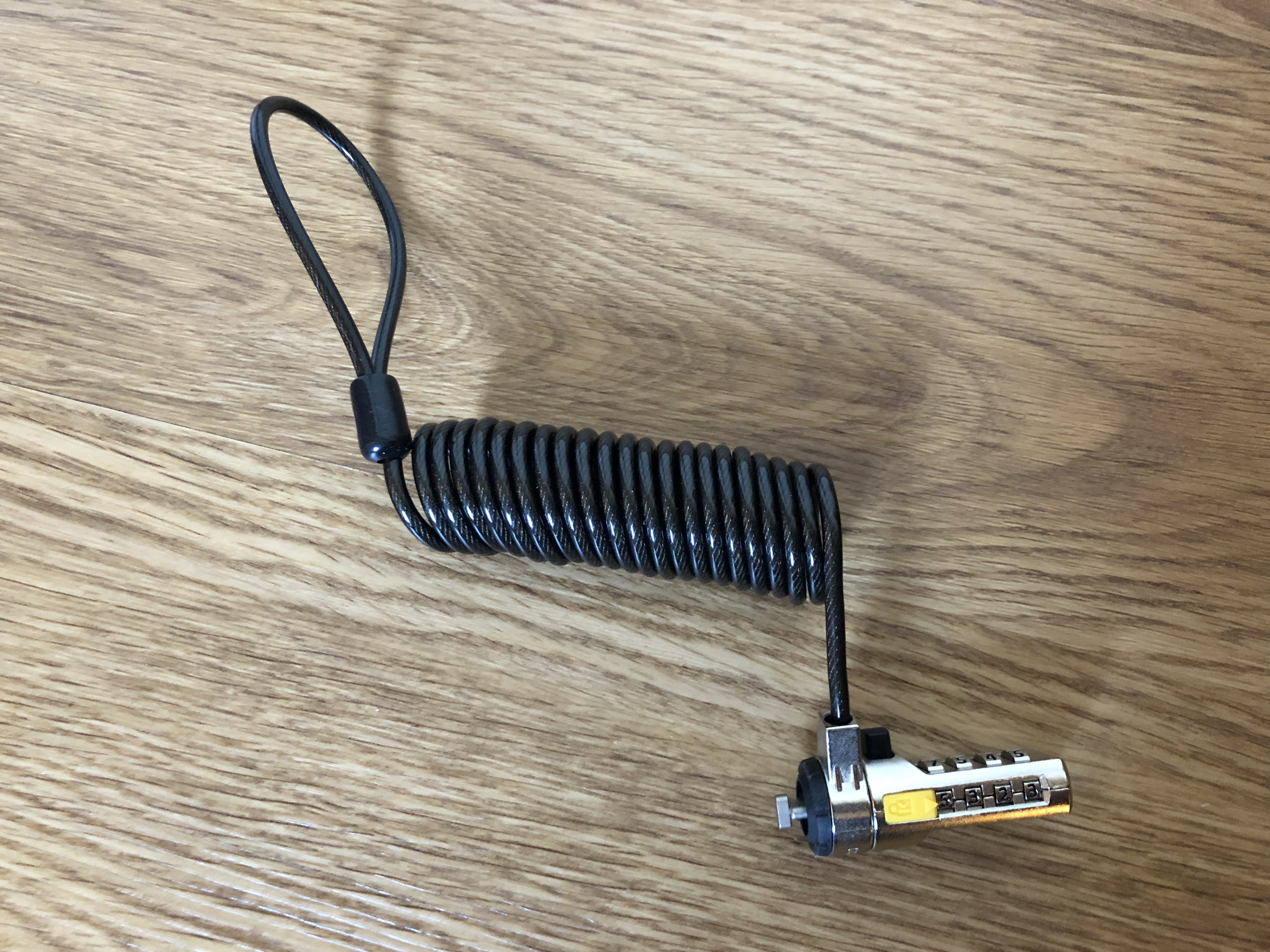
Kensington Laptop Lock

Kensington created a slot-based locking mechanism in 1992 very similar to ones Jay S. Derman had patented earlier; eventually leading to Kensington and ACCO Brands acquiring those patents and keeping him on as a designer.

The system consists of a small, metal-reinforced hole found commonly on small or portable computers and electronic equipment such as laptops, computer monitors, desktop computers, video game consoles, audio interfaces, and video projectors, combined with a metal anchor attached to a rubberized metal cable secured with a key or combination lock. The end of the cable has a small loop that allows the cable to be looped around a permanent object, such as a heavy table or other similar equipment.

The hole is found in many laptops, although a lock for it is typically not included. Occasionally, the slot is located so that installing a lock will also prevent the removal of a valuable subcomponent, such as a rechargeable battery or a memory module. The Kensington slot may be marked with a small icon that looks like a padlock with a capital "K", or the slot may be unlabelled.

For many years, 95% of all laptops were manufactured with a Kensington slot.

== Efficacy ==
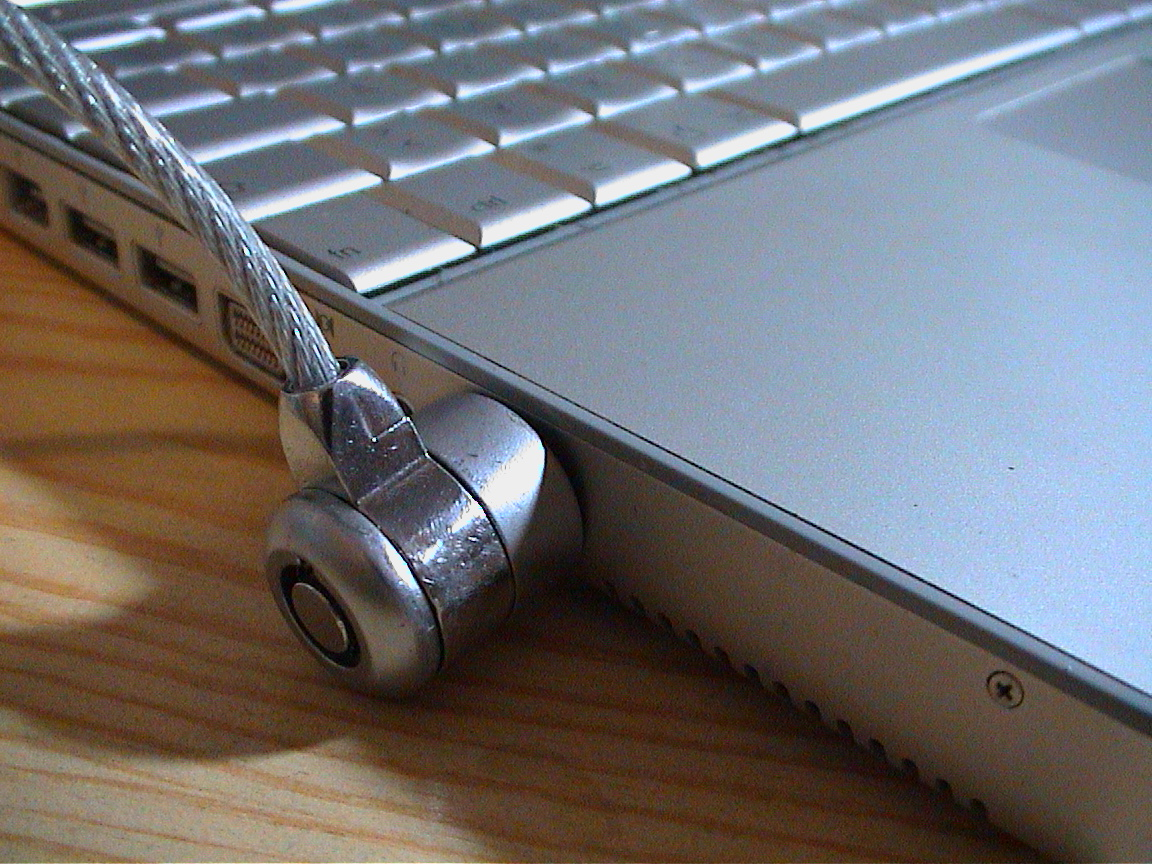
Kensington lock attached to a Kensington Security Slot on a PowerBook G4

Kensington locks can discourage opportunistic grab-and-run thefts of equipment from public locations such as coffee shops or libraries, but they are not designed to be impervious protection measures, nor are they intended to secure equipment in unattended locations, because they can be torn out of equipment (although not without causing visible damage), given that the cases are typically made of plastic or thin metal, and the cable can be cut with wire or bolt cutters. In addition to this, successfully securing the non-locking, loop end of the cable is dependent upon the availability of a suitable anchoring point on a virtually immovable base object, or a thief may just shift that object, and then take the protected device with cable attached.

The lock mechanism is typically a tubular pin tumbler lock or, less frequently, a flat key lock or a numeric combination lock with no key.

== Alternatives ==
As laptops have gotten thinner, many no longer have the space above and below the "long side" of the 7 mm x 3 mm security slot required for the original Kensington security lock.

There are at least 2 alternative slot-based locking mechanisms that fit much thinner laptops, where the lock does not extend above or below the "long side" of the security slot, but instead extends left and right behind the "short side" of the security slot:

The Kensington NanoSaver Laptop Lock fits into a Kensington Nano Security Slot. Some Lenovo ThinkPads, HP laptops, and ASUS laptops are manufactured with a 6 mm x 2.5 mm Kensington Nano Security Slot.

Newer Dell laptops are manufactured with a 4.5 mm x 3.2 mm Noble Wedge-Shaped Security Slot.

Several manufacturers offer similar locking mechanisms that do not require a special lock hole. They attach to a popular port, such as the VGA or printer port, and have special screws to secure locks in place, though this is less relevant in modern PCs that often lack these ports.
