= Kryptonite (disambiguation) =

Kryptonite is a fictional material from the Superman comic book series.

Kryptonite or Cryptonite may also refer to:

== Arts and entertainment ==
=== Comics ===
- Kryptonite (story arc) a 2007–2008 Superman Confidential story arc
- Kryptonite Man, several DC Comics supervillains

=== Film and television ===
- Kryptonite!, a 2011 Italian film
- Kryptonita (English: Kryptonite), a 2015 Argentinian film
- "Kryptonite" (New Girl), a 2011 television episode

=== Music ===
- Apollo (band), originally Kryptonite, a late-1970s American R&B/disco group
- Kryptonite (album), by DJ Fresh, 2010
- "Kryptonite" (3 Doors Down song), 2000
- "Kryptonite" (Don Toliver song), 2024
- "Kryptonite (I'm on It)", a song by Purple Ribbon All-Stars, 2006
- "Kryptonite", a song by James Arthur, 2014
- "Kryptonite", a song by Guy Sebastian from Beautiful Life, 2004
- "Kryptonite", a song by Mario from Go, 2007
- "Kryptonite", a song by James Spaulding from Schizophrenia, 1967
- "Cryptonite", a song by Nettspend, 2023

== Other uses ==
- Kryptonite lock, a brand of bicycle lock
- Operation Kryptonite, a 2007 military operation by British, Dutch and Afghan forces

== See also ==
- Krypton (disambiguation)
- Jadarite, a mineral with a similar formula to the fictional kryptonite
- Pocket Full of Kryptonite, a 1991 album by the Spin Doctors
- CryptoNight
