= Gravis PC GamePad =

Game port game controller

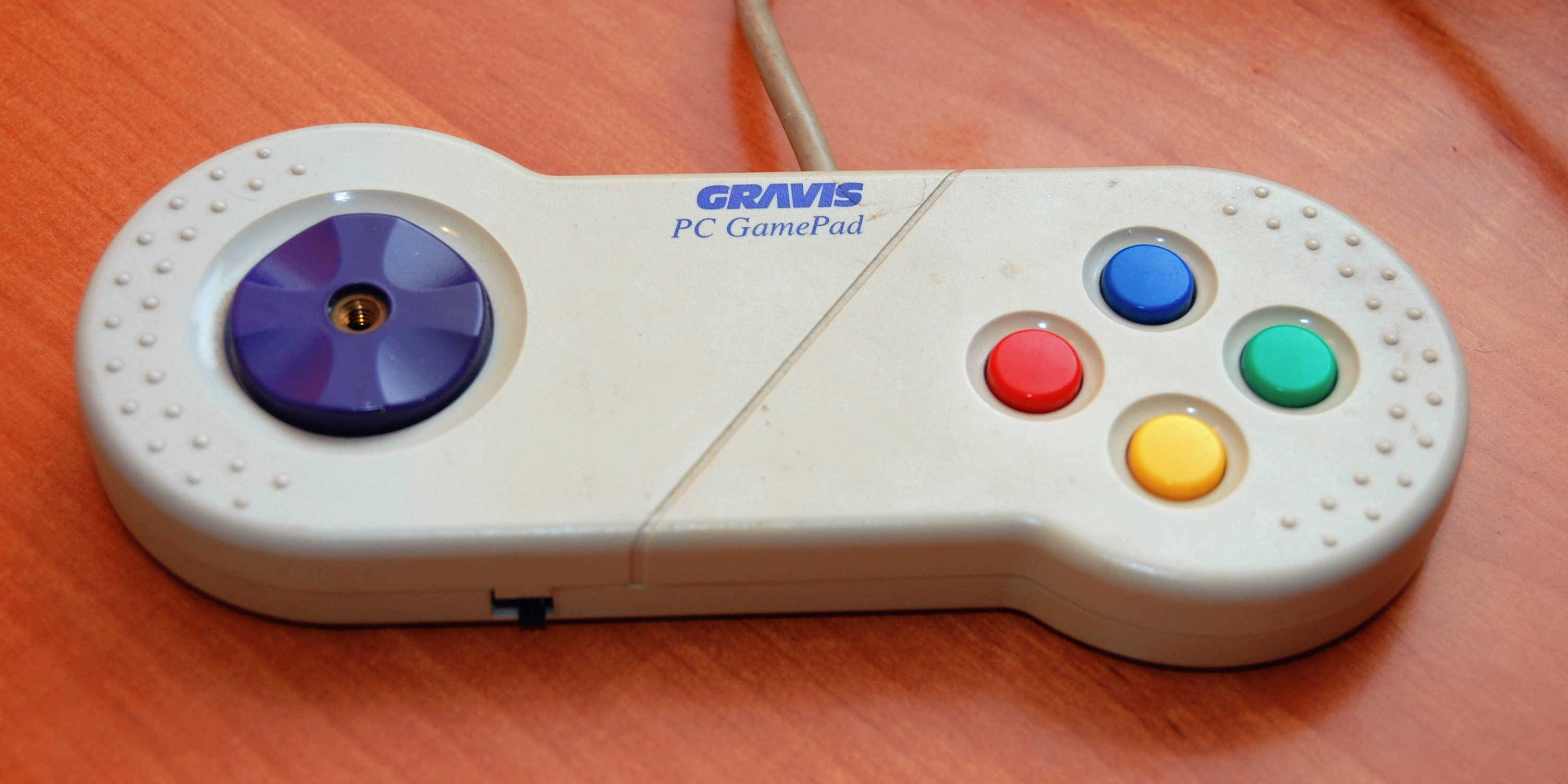
Original Gravis Gamepad for the PC

The Gravis PC GamePad is a game port game controller produced by Advanced Gravis Computer Technology first released in 1991. It was the first gamepad for the IBM PC compatible in a market then dominated by joysticks. Included with the gamepad was a shareware Commander Keen game, episode 1, Marooned on Mars, which was later replaced with the shareware episode 4, Secret of the Oracle which supported all 4 buttons. The gamepad is no longer manufactured, as Gravis was acquired in 1997 by Kensington Computer Products Group.

== Features ==
The gamepad's design is similar to that of the stock SNES controller (more so the Japanese and European version with colored buttons), although it lacks the Start, Select and shoulder buttons, and the shape of the controller's chassis differs slightly, with an inverted curve on the left side. As originally found in some versions of the Master System controller, the center of the Gravis GamePad's d-pad allows a small joystick to be inserted. The resulting lever action provides increased directional sensitivity, which may be preferred in fighting games.

Both at the top and bottom of the gamepad are switches. One of them removes the normal functionality from 2 of the buttons, and turns them into autofire variants of the first 2. This gave all four buttons functionality even in PC games that only supported two buttons on joysticks or for scenarios when two gamepads are connected with a Y-splitter. The other allows for left-handed operation by turning the workings of the D-pad and buttons upside down.

== Variations ==
For PC, two followup variations were made, called the GamePad Pro and GamePad Pro USB, which resemble the original PlayStation Controller, with the addition of four shoulder buttons, as well as Select and Start buttons. The GamePad Pro utilized the 'button' signal lines on an analog PC joystick port to send digital signals (referred to as "GrIP") to allow for both the use of ten buttons and the simultaneous use of up to four controllers connected by the controller's built-in piggyback plug. A switch on the back of the non-USB pad could be used to allow the pad to function as a standard analog four-button pad; otherwise, games could not detect the gamepad unless they were coded with the device in mind (DOS) or a specific driver was installed (Windows). The latter uses the USB port and the USB Human Interface Device class standards, and is not intended for DOS use. Gravis also launched other series of gamepads for the Mac, the Amiga, and Atari ST.

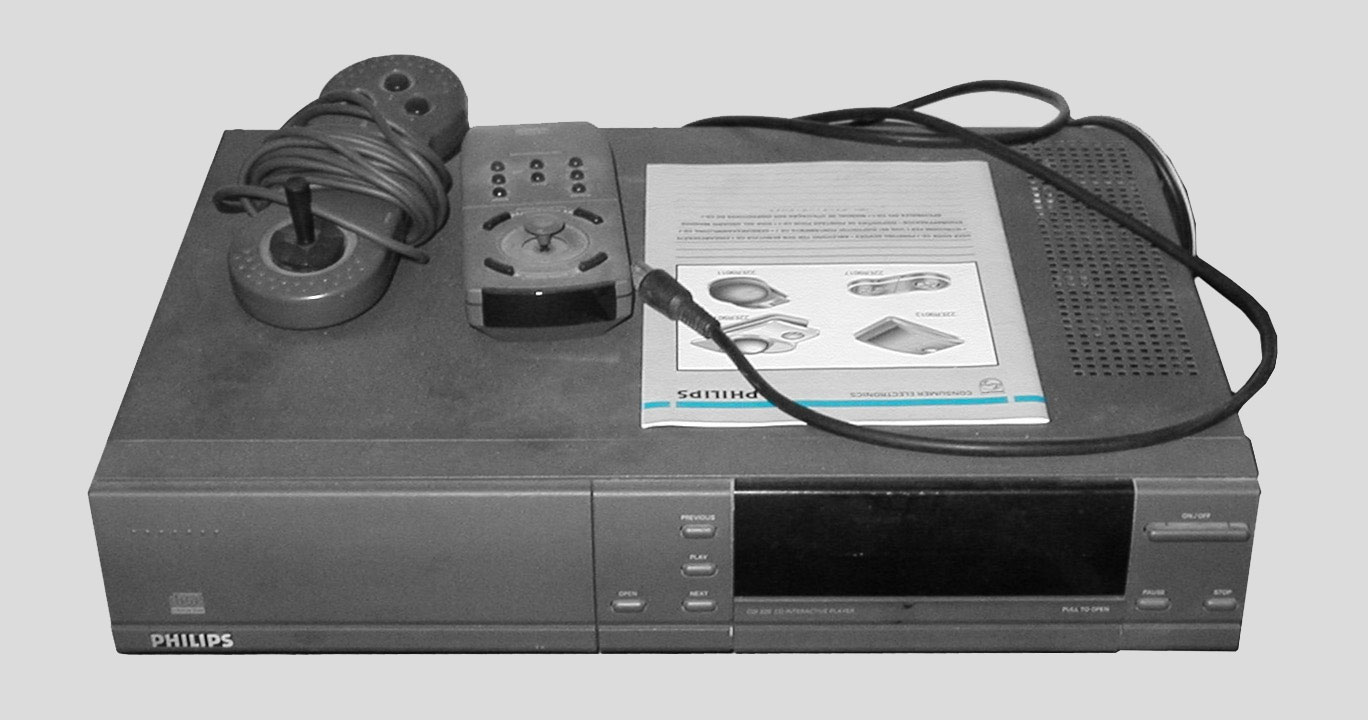
CD-i with wired controller on top

The Philips CD-i interactive multimedia CD player features a wired controller that is basically the original Gravis PC GamePad in a monochrome, grey colour scheme. The Gravis logo is replaced with the Philips logo. There are only two button functions, and the switch at the bottom controls the cursor speed in menus.

== Reception ==
According to Next Generation in 1996, "The Gravis Game Pad, one of the first and probably the best PC game pad, has enjoyed steady sales for several years." Giochi per il mio computer gave the regular version a score of 7.7 out of 10 and the Pro version a score of 7.6 out of 10 in 1997.

== Media ==
One icon from the Nuvola icon set resembles the GamePad. The GamePad was also the official gamepad of Jazz Jackrabbit, as noted in the shareware demo version of the game. The gamepad appears in the game as a power-up, and as an advertisement in the background, which reads "All kids love Gravis GamePad".

== See also ==
- Microsoft Sidewinder
