= Krypton (disambiguation) =

Krypton is a chemical element with symbol Kr and atomic number 36.

Krypton may also refer to:

- Krypton (comics), a fictional planet and the birthplace of Kal-El, better known as Superman
  - Krypton (TV series), a series for SyFy following Superman's grandfather
- Kh-31, also known as AS-17 "Krypton", a Russian anti-radar missile
- Krypton (band), a Romanian pop-rock band
- Krypton (programming language), a frame-based computer programming language
- Krypton, Kentucky

Crypton may refer to:

- Crypton (fabric), a patented stain prevention fabric treatment
- CRYPTON, a block cipher in cryptography
- Crypton, deprecated name for mitosome, an organelle in biology
- Crypton transposon, a family of DNA transposons
- Crypton (particle), a theoretical sub-atomic particle
- Crypton Future Media, a Japanese company
- Crypton (framework), a cryptographic web framework
- Crypton Engineering, a defunct Italian motor racing team

== See also ==
- Kryptonite (disambiguation)
- Kr (disambiguation)
- Isotopes of krypton
