= Gravis =

Gravis may refer to:

- Advanced Gravis Computer Technology, manufacturer of computer peripherals, soundcards and joysticks
- Dynamic Sport Gravis, a Polish paraglider design
- Gravis (Ninjago), a character in Ninjago
- Gravis, an alien in the Doctor Who story Frontios
- Myasthenia gravis, a long-term neuromuscular disease
