= Costruzioni Italiane Serrature e Affini =

Costruzioni Italiane Serrature e Affini S.p.A.
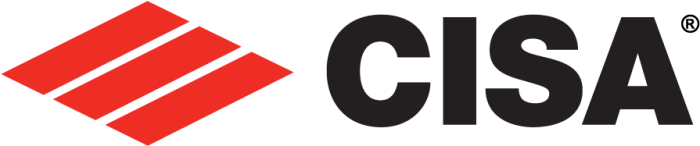
- Logo used since 1970
- Trade name: CISA S.p.A.
- Type: Subsidiary
- Industry: Locking, Access control
- Founded: 1926; 100 years ago
- Founder: Luigi Bucci
- Headquarters: Faenza, Italy
- Number of locations: 3 offices

Costruzioni Italiane Serrature e Affini, also known by the acronym CISA, is an Italian manufacturer of locking and access control systems.

== History ==
Costruzioni Italiane Serrature e Affini was founded in Florence, by Luigi Bucci in 1926. The company is part of Allegion.

CISA is present worldwide in over 70 countries.

From 2 December 2013 CISA became part of the new Allegion group, which includes international brands in the security technology sector.

CISA is present in Italy with offices in Faenza and Monsampolo del Tronto. The Monsampolo office specializes in the production of keys and cylinders.
