= Tubular pin tumbler lock =

Round-key lock

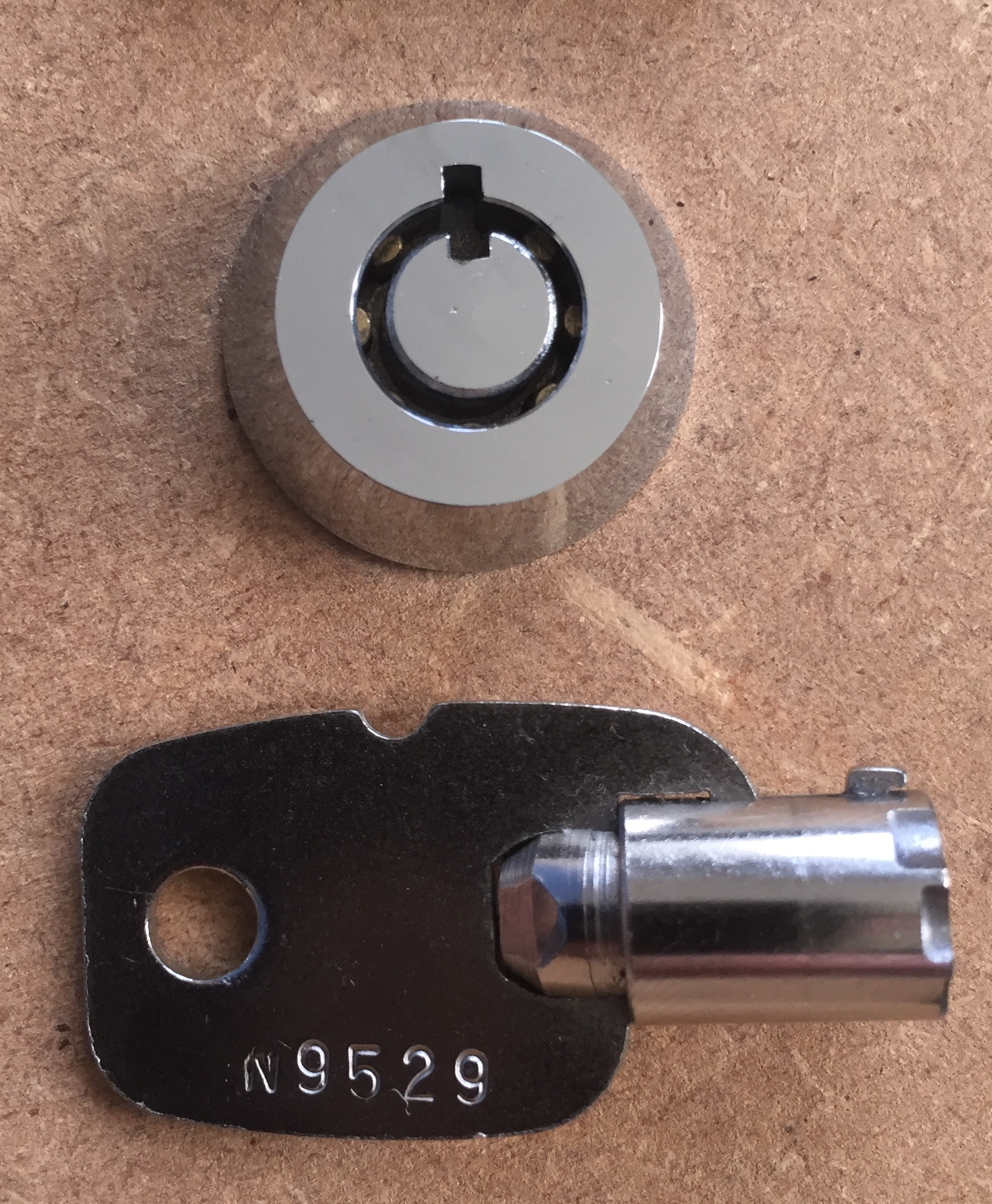
A tubular lock and key

A tubular pin tumbler lock, also known as a circle pin tumbler lock, radial lock, or the trademark Ace lock popularized by manufacturer Chicago Lock Company since 1933, is a variety of pin tumbler lock in which a number of pins are arranged in a circular pattern, and the corresponding key is tubular or cylindrical in shape. Most locks use between six and eight pins, although some use as few as four or as many as ten. The devices have been widely used on vending machines, elevators, public computers, and bicycle locks.

== Design ==
The design of a tubular lock is similar to the pin tumbler lock, in that there are several stacks of pins. The key is a cylinder shape with notches cut around the outer or (rarely) inner edge. Each of these notches depresses a single pin inside the lock to a specific height allowing the lock cylinder to turn freely.

Mechanism

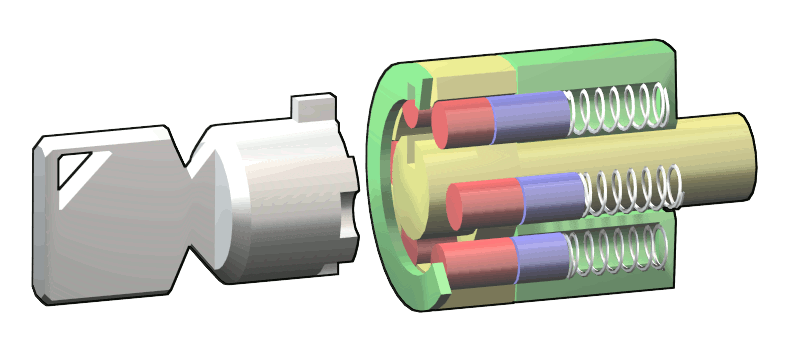
The key pins (red) and driver pins (blue) are pushed towards the front of the lock, preventing the plug (yellow) from rotating. The tubular key has several half-cylinder indentations which align with the pins.

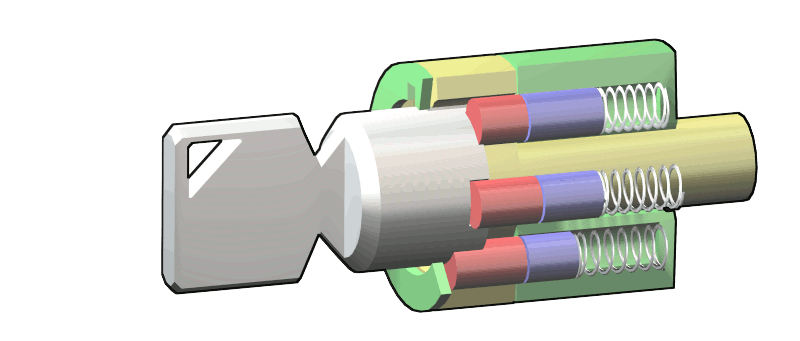
The protrusion on top of the key fits into the rectangular recess in the lock, causing the indentations to properly align with the pins. When the key is inserted, the gaps between the key pins (red) and driver pins (blue) align with the shear plane separating the plug (yellow) from the outer casing (green).

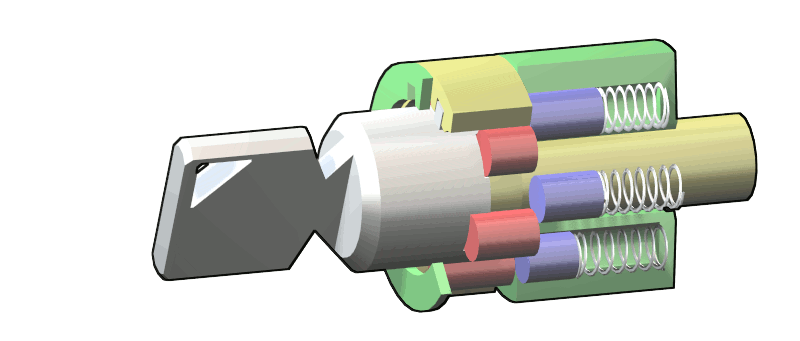
With the pins correctly aligned, the lock may turn.

== Uses ==
Tubular locks are commonly seen on bicycle locks (such as the Kryptonite lock), Kensington computer locks, elevators, and a variety of coin-operated devices such as vending machines, and coin-operated washing machines.

Tubular pin tumbler locks are often considered to be safer and more resistant to picking than standard locks. This is primarily because they are often seen on coin boxes for vending machines and coin-operated machines, such as those used in a laundromat. However, the primary reason this type of lock is used in these applications is that it can be made physically shorter than other locks.

== Vulnerabilities ==
Such locks can be picked by a special tubular lock pick with minimal effort in very little time; it is also possible to defeat them by drilling with a hole-saw drill bit. Standard tubular-lock drill bit diameters are 0.375 in (9.5 mm) and 0.394 in (10.0 mm). To prevent drilling, many tubular locks have a middle pin made from hardened steel or contain a ball bearing in the middle pin.

Some tubular locks, such as those used on older models of Kryptonite-brand bike locks, can be opened with the back end of a ball-point pen.

== See also ==
- Pin tumbler lock
- Tubular lock pick
- Wafer tumbler lock
