= Advanced Gravis =

Canadian computer component manufacturer

Advanced Gravis Computer Technology, Ltd.

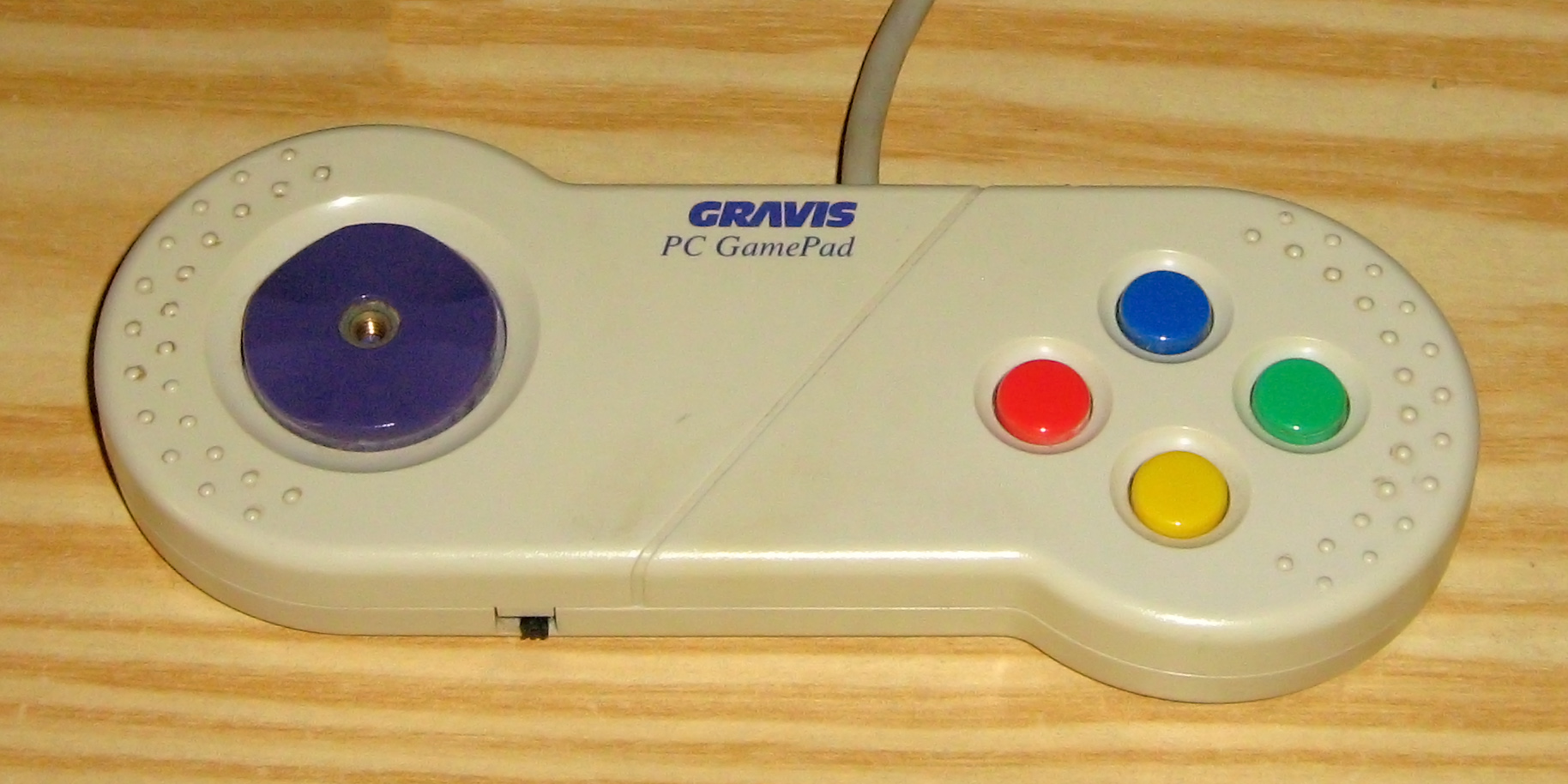
- Gravis Gamepad
- Type: Private
- Industry: Computer
- Founded: 1982; 44 years ago in British Columbia, Canada
- Defunct: 1997; 29 years ago
- Fate: Acquired by Kensington Computer Products Group
- Products: Peripherals

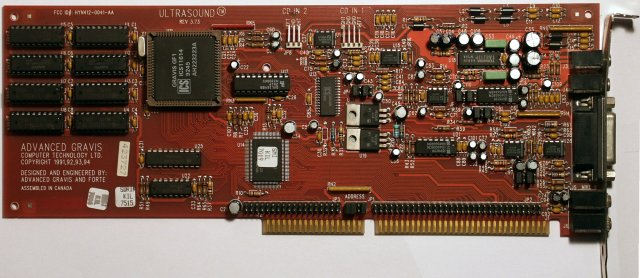
The original Gravis UltraSound card ("Classic")

Advanced Gravis Computer Technology, Ltd. was a manufacturer of computer peripherals and hardware. The company was founded in 1982 in British Columbia, Canada.

Their most famous products were the Gravis PC GamePad, at one time one of the most popular gaming controllers for the PC, the once-ubiquitous Gravis Joystick (black with red buttons), and the Gravis UltraSound add-on card, competitor to the Sound Blaster. At its peak, the company had almost 300 employees with a European office in The Netherlands, and was at the time the world's largest manufacturer of computer joysticks and gamepads.

The company was acquired by Kensington Computer Products Group towards the end of 1997. Although the brand remained in use for some time after this, with the website still active until the mid-2000s it has since essentially disappeared.

== Product Development and Technological Innovations ==
During the late 1980s and early 1990s, Advanced Gravis expanded its portfolio to include gamepads compatible with home consoles like the NES and PC platforms. Their four-button Gravis GamePad launched in 1991 was considered an essential controller for PC gamers. The product lineup evolved over time, including models such as the Phoenix (1994), Firebird (1996), and Blackhawk (1997).

Gravis also experimented with advanced input protocols. In 2000, the company partnered with Immersion Corp. to integrate ARC motor feedback into peripherals. This innovation used digital signals over traditional 15-pin analogue ports, enhancing button capacity and axis precision.

One of their early joystick models, the MK VI, released in 1986, featured a pistol-grip design, tension control, and three independent fire buttons, demonstrating Gravis's commitment to ergonomic and customizable input. Later USB-compatible products like the GamePad Pro USB (2001) and Eliminator series extended Gravis's relevance well into the 2000s before the brand eventually phased out.
