= Chicago Lock =

American lock manufacturer

Chicago Lock Co. is a lock manufacturer, founded in Chicago in 1920. Since 1933, it has sold a tubular pin tumbler lock marketed under the registered trademark "Ace." Millions of Ace locks have been sold; for instance, these locks are used in Northwestern Corporation's Triple Play bulk vending machine. In 2004 it was widely publicized that the barrel of a cheap ballpoint pen would act as an effective lock pick for many brands of tubular lock.

== History ==
Chicago Lock Co was located on the northside of Chicago, from 1920 until 1964, at Racine and Clyborn avenues. In 1964, the company relocated to the northwest side of the city at Belmont and Lowell avenues. In 1995, the company again relocated this time to Pleasant Prairie, Wisconsin.

The company was family owned and operated for 80 years. The popular history of the company was that it began as a lightning rod manufacturer, later they grew into a furniture builder that incorporated locks in some of the pieces they created. This then began their long history of lock making.

The company engineered locks to their customers' specific needs, furniture, vending, car alarms, military, and wall safes were among the specialty products.

== Acquisition ==
Chicago Lock was acquired in November 1999 by CompX, and its products continue to be manufactured at a facility in Mauldin, South Carolina.
