= Seatylock =

- Industry: Security
- Founded: 2008; 18 years ago
- Website: https://seatylock.com

Seatylock produces locking solutions for bicycles, e-bikes, scooters, and motorcycles.

== History ==
Established in 2008, Seatylock's products are tested and certified by organizations such as Sold Secure in the United Kingdom, ART in the Netherlands, and FUB in France to ensure they meet established security standards.

== Design awards ==
- Reddot 2020 - Red Dot Design Award
- EPDA 2020 - European Product Design Award
- DNA Paris design awards 2023
- IDA design award 2024 - Design Award Bronze Winner

== See also ==
- Kryptonite lock
