= Kryptonite (story arc) =

Story arc in Superman comics

- Cover of Superman Confidential #1 (Nov. 2006). Art by Tim Sale.

Publication information
- Publisher: DC Comics
- Schedule: monthly
- Publication date: January 2007 - March 2008
- No. of issues: 6
- Main character(s): Superman; Lois Lane; Jimmy Olsen; Perry White

Creative team
- Written by: Darwyn Cooke
- Artist: Tim Sale

Kryptonite is a story arc written by Darwyn Cooke and Tim Sale that appeared in Superman Confidential, a monthly series that was published from January 2007 and then later cancelled in April 2008 that told stories set in the character's early years of his career. This arc, the first story from that title, tells the story of Superman's first encounter with kryptonite. Artist Tim Sale described the story's theme as "...Superman learning about vulnerability, and one of the ways that he had to learn it, and ultimately the most personal way, was through his relationship with Lois". With Superman: Secret Origin, it has been assumed this story arc is not in continuity anymore as of 2010.

== Plot ==
From the flashbacks; Kal-El's rocket reaches the Earth, and as it does, a chunk of green rock breaks off. It is taken to a temple as a display, where five years later, it is stolen by mobsters and set in their courtyard. After the mobster is killed by his own wife; she is then killed by their son, Tony Gallo, who appears to be under the influence of the rock. As time passes, Gallo grows up into a vile, contemptible person. The rock itself, narrating, makes a point that it cannot exist without "him".

In present-day Metropolis, Superman fights the Royal Flush Gang on a tanker. He thinks about how the city sees him as a symbol of hope just as much as he hopes he does not screw up just as the gang causes the tanker to explode. Because Superman is not hurt, he wonders if he will ever feel pain. Later, Superman and Lois Lane share a meal on the Eiffel Tower, pointing out that he hates not spending enough time with the perfect woman. The next day, Perry White meets with Clark Kent, Lois Lane and Jimmy Olsen; after starting dramatic, he assigns to the team their next story: the new Metropolis casino from Tony Gallo that might be an illegal front. After setting up their undercover location to set up a sting; Lois calls Gallo, who decides to talk to her after realizing who she is. Gallo sets up dinner with Lois, thinking the article is of a positive nature, but because Lois has an engagement with Superman, asks to be set up for tomorrow. Clark, listening, is happy and goes on patrol that night before seeing Lois, where he finds a village in danger from a volcano. He goes to subdue the volcano by going below, but Superman almost drowns in the lava and misses the date with Lois as she is now being taken by Gallo. A scared Superman goes to see Ma and Pa Kent and after telling them the story, Pa asks Clark to come to him if it happens again, as Ma can get easily scared. Gallo returns Lois home, having a great time, and just as Gallo leaves, Lois sees Superman.

Lois and Superman talk at her apartment, where she reveals that she met a perfect man but, because he is committed to the world, does not think a relationship could work and thus leaves him. Ace, the android member of the Royal Flush Gang, meets with Lex Luthor to discuss the fight; the point of the attack was to see what could harm Superman. Luthor gets an idea when he hears Superman caring for the people around him and tells the android and the Gang to leave Metropolis. After Superman talks to a polar bear close to the Fortress of Solitude over his problems, he returns home, giving a huge cake for "Fun Day" where Luthor is giving a presentation and Lois hands Superman a card from Gallo; he asks Superman to pick up a check from the first six months of profits to be sent for pediatric care. He reads that toward the audience, but heads out when an explosion occurs at the casino. Just as Gallo stands naked toward the green glow from the rock, Superman begins to fall, losing his ability to fly, into the crater made from the explosion. Luthor watches his men beat Superman up, but cannot believe what they are using is that effective. Once Gallo closes the door from the rock, Superman becomes healthy again and defeats the men, before passing out. Jimmy comes over and helps him out by taking him to Clark's (to which Clark answers, as it is a robot Superman built). Lois goes to see Jimmy at the hideout, but he is not there and finds Luthor instead, who shows her images that prove Superman can be hurt. Mr. Ogilvy, from the Daily Planet, is a double agent as he reveals to Gallo what the reporters have been doing.

Lois asks Gallo about himself and Gallo wants to tell her a "fantastic" story. Lex finds out that Gallo has a rock of alien origin inside his building just as Superman goes back to Smallville to meet with his parents. Talking to both of them in the barn; Clark tells them about what happened and thinks he can be killed. Lois calls Jimmy to come over to the Casino, as Luthor plots his invasion on Gallo's casino. As promised at "Fun Day", Superman arrives at the casino, where Gallo meets with him with Lois and Jimmy behind him and reveals who he really is. Tony Gallo is not Tony Gallo at all; but a physical embodiment of kryptonite that came to Earth the same time Superman did. Gallo wants to show Superman his origins by going inside the kryptonite room, but its effects might kill him: Superman agrees anyway. Inside, Superman falls in pain and the rock takes an anthropomorphic form, just as Luthor arrives and insists on keeping the door opened. Just as they scan Superman and kryptonite, Gallo awakens and snaps, screaming to kill them all. Superman and the kryptonite are on Krypton at a time before it exploded; he sees Jor-El and Lara and sees himself as a baby. Gallo, driven mad, kills himself after thinking Lois is his mother. Luthor prepares to kill Lois and Jimmy, but Jimmy threatens him instead. Just as Krypton explodes, Superman sees how he escaped and is in tears when he sees Jor-El and Lara die, completing his origin. Luthor leaves, but is happy that he got a piece of the rock, just as Superman awakens to a relieved Lois and Jimmy.

Doing what the kryptonite asked for, Superman sends the rock into the sun and recounts the story to his Ma and Pa. He then goes to see Lois, as Clark, and asks if she wants some company. She agrees and they spend the night together.

== Reaction ==
Since its publication, readers have favored the story. The general response was that the story contained great moments between Lois and Superman, Superman with Ma and Pa Kent, and Tim Sale's artwork was great, but felt the story was mediocre, with Lex Luthor and Jimmy Olsen having no place in the story, and feeling the entity within the kryptonite was random. Supermanhomepage.com reviewed the issues of the story, and while they praised the first five, the final issue had a low score because of inconsistency with the entity that was inside the kryptonite.

== Continuity ==
With Superman: Secret Origin by Geoff Johns and Gary Frank, it can be assumed that this storyline is not in continuity anymore, but that notion can neither be confirmed nor denied as of 2010. The reasons ranged from Superman encountering kryptonite for the first time in this story, whereas this turns out to have happened in Secret Origin; the Fortress' appearance; the appearances of Krypton; Jor-El and Lara; and the events of this story itself have all led to the speculation that this storyline has been removed from continuity entirely.
