= Crypton (fabric) =

Technology for fabric treatment

Crypton is a name for a patented technology for the treatment of fabric to prevent it from becoming stained and to resist and inhibit the growth of bacteria. It is commonly used in the upholstery industry, and is popularly used in hotels and on cruise ships. Fabrics which are subjected to this technology become what the manufacturer describes as "Crypton Super Fabrics", and become able to resist penetration by water such that any water-based liquids which are applied to the fabric do not soak into it and do not penetrate any material underneath (such as a cushion). Crypton contains no volatile organic compounds nor formaldehyde. It was developed in 1993.
