= Kryptonite lock =

Bicycle lock

Kryptonite Corporation
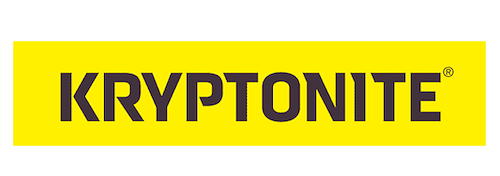

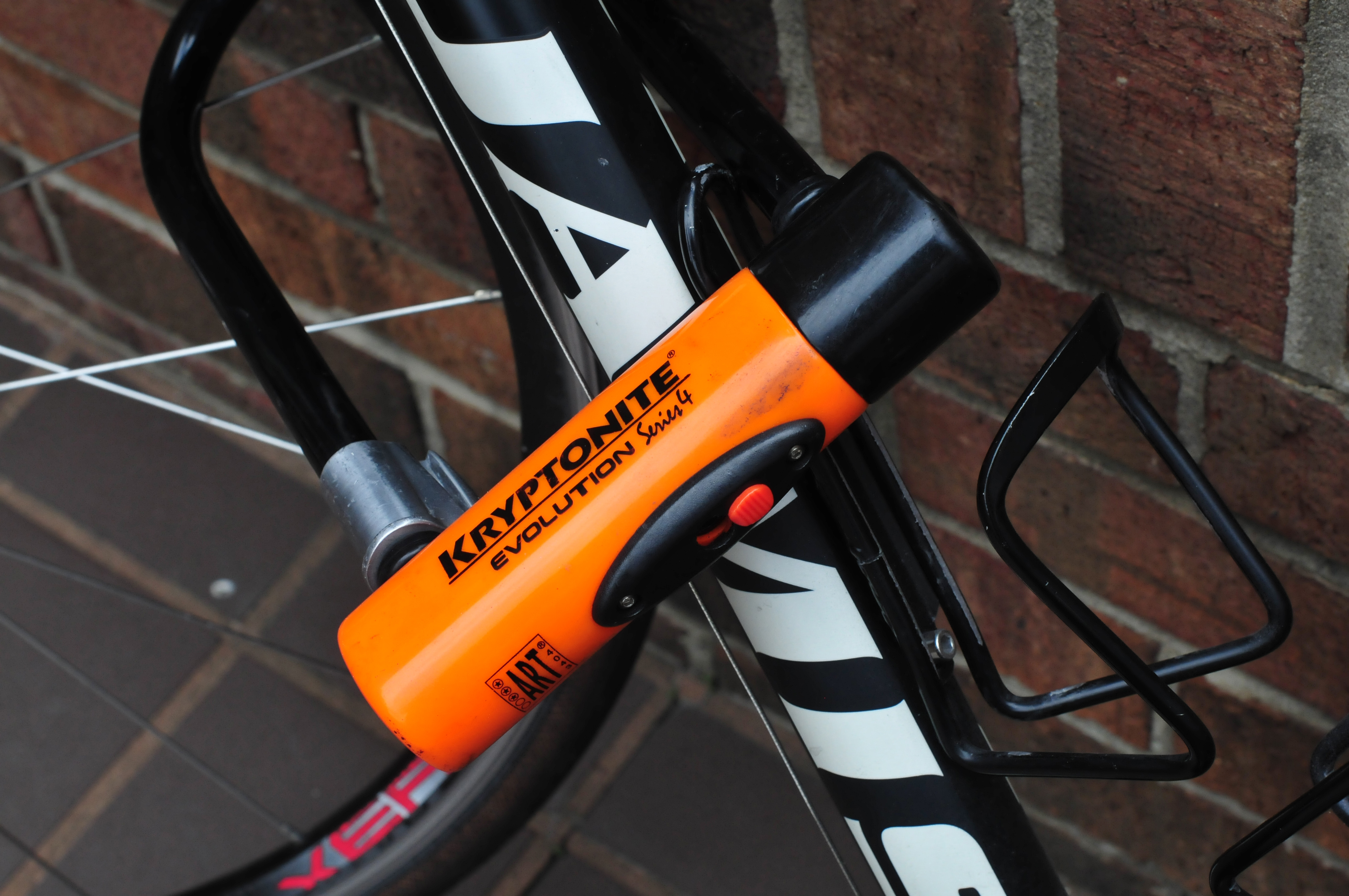
- Formerly: KBL Corporation (until April 1985)
- Type: Subsidiary
- Industry: Outdoor recreation products
- Founded: 1972; 54 years ago
- Founder: Stanley Kaplan
- Headquarters: Canton, Massachusetts, US
- Key people: Karen Rizzo, General Manager and Director of Marketing
- Products: Locks, and other security and safety products for bicycles, motorcycles, outdoor equipment
- Brands: Evolution series, New York Lock
- Number of employees: 30 (2008–2018)
- Parent: Allegion
- Website: kryptonitelock.com

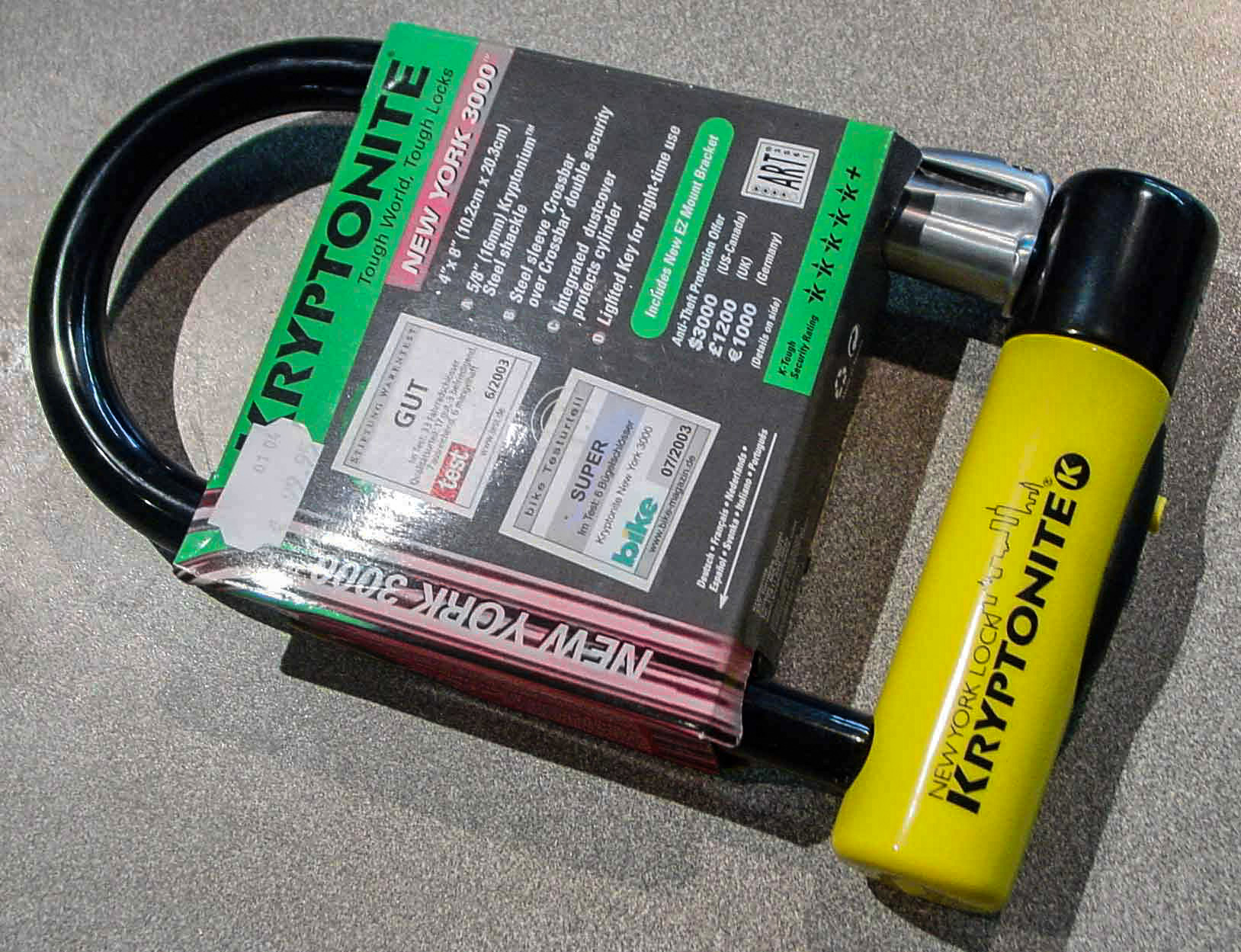
a "New York 3000" Kryptonite lock

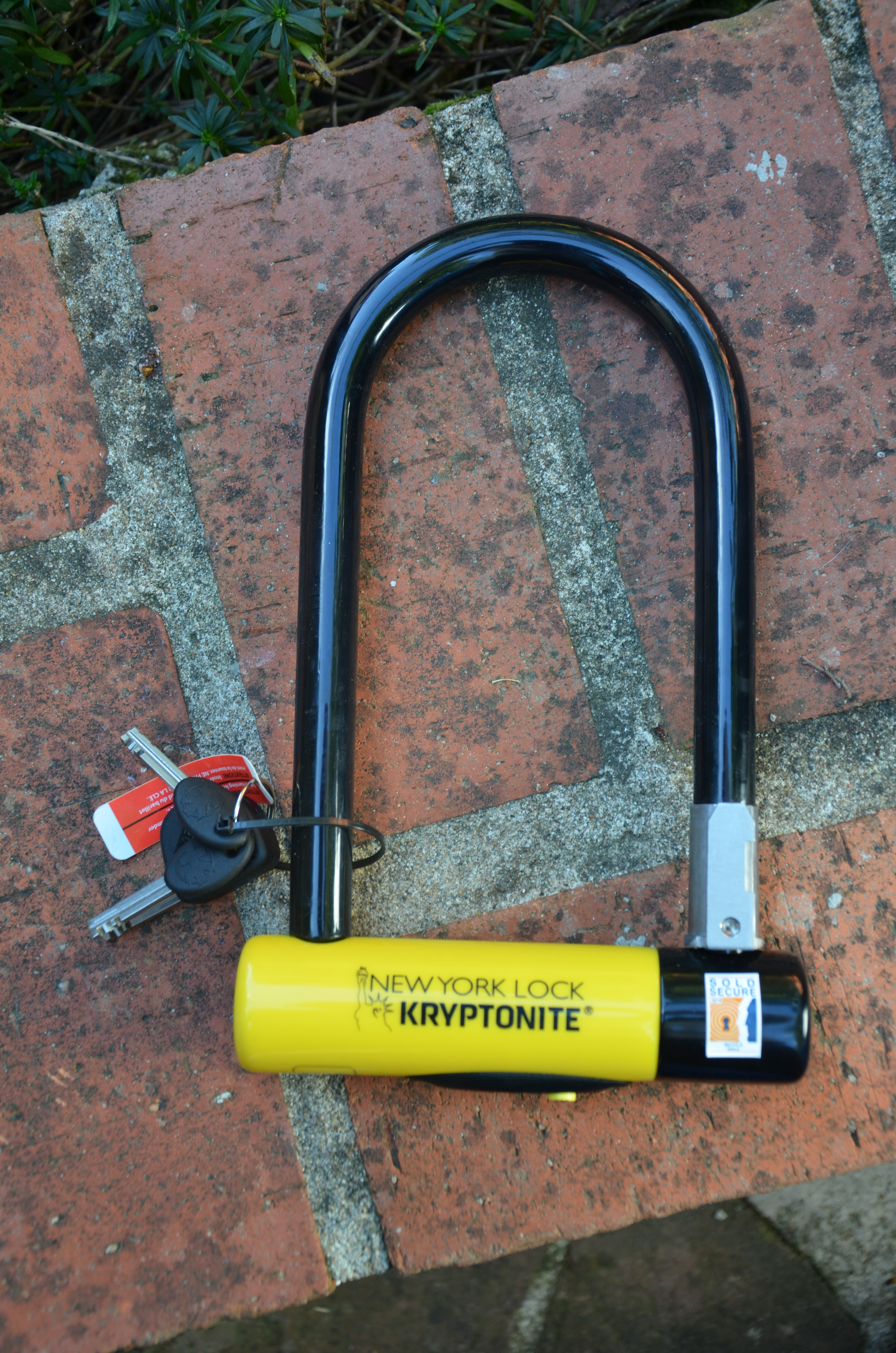
"New York standard" Kryptonite lock

Kryptonite is an Allegion-owned brand of bicycle lock for securing a bicycle to a pole or other fixture, when the owner wants to leave the bicycle in a public place. The basic design, made of hardened steel of circular cross section bent into a U-shape with a removable crossbar, has been emulated by numerous other manufacturers, and adapted with variations in size and shape for other applications, such as locking motorcycles.

The product was named after kryptonite, the fictitious substance that can thwart the powerful comic-book hero Superman. The name is used under a limited trademark agreement with DC Comics dating back to 1983.

== History ==
The Kryptonite u-lock was developed by Stanley Kaplan. Kaplan partnered with Michael Zane, whose father had a metal manufacturing company, to produce and market the locks. In 1972 Michael Zane bought the lock and company from Kaplan. In the early 1970s, in the US, the only proven method to secure one's bicycle was by the use of case hardened security chains with hexagonal links, but some cyclists were making the mistake of using inexpensive chains or cables that could be breached by thieves using commonly available tools. Indeed, local hardware stores would often sell inexpensive chain cut to length using simple bolt cutters. The first Kryptonite lock model was made of sheet metal cut and bent to shape, but the company soon went to the now universal circular cross section.

In an early test of the Kryptonite lock, a bicycle was locked to a signpost in Greenwich Village in New York City for thirty days. Thieves stripped the bicycle of every part that could be removed, but the lock resisted all attempts to break it.

Ingersoll Rand acquired Kryptonite in 2001. In 2013 Ingersoll Rand's security products were placed in a spin-off company called Allegion.

== Design ==
Until 2004, Kryptonite locks used the tubular pin tumbler locking mechanism. In 2005, after it was demonstrated that the tubular pin tumbler locks used on Kryptonite locks could easily be opened with the shaft of a Bic ballpoint pen of matching diameter, Kryptonite changed their locks from the tubular to a disc mechanism, preventing the use of cylindrically shaped objects to defeat the locking system. After this problem became public, Kryptonite offered a free exchange program for all owners of locks with tubular mechanisms. Kryptonite launched a Messenger Collection in 2015, created with input from actual bicycle messengers in New York City.

== See also ==
- Kryptonite (disambiguation)
- Seatylock
