= Kensington Computer Products Group =

American PC peripheral maker

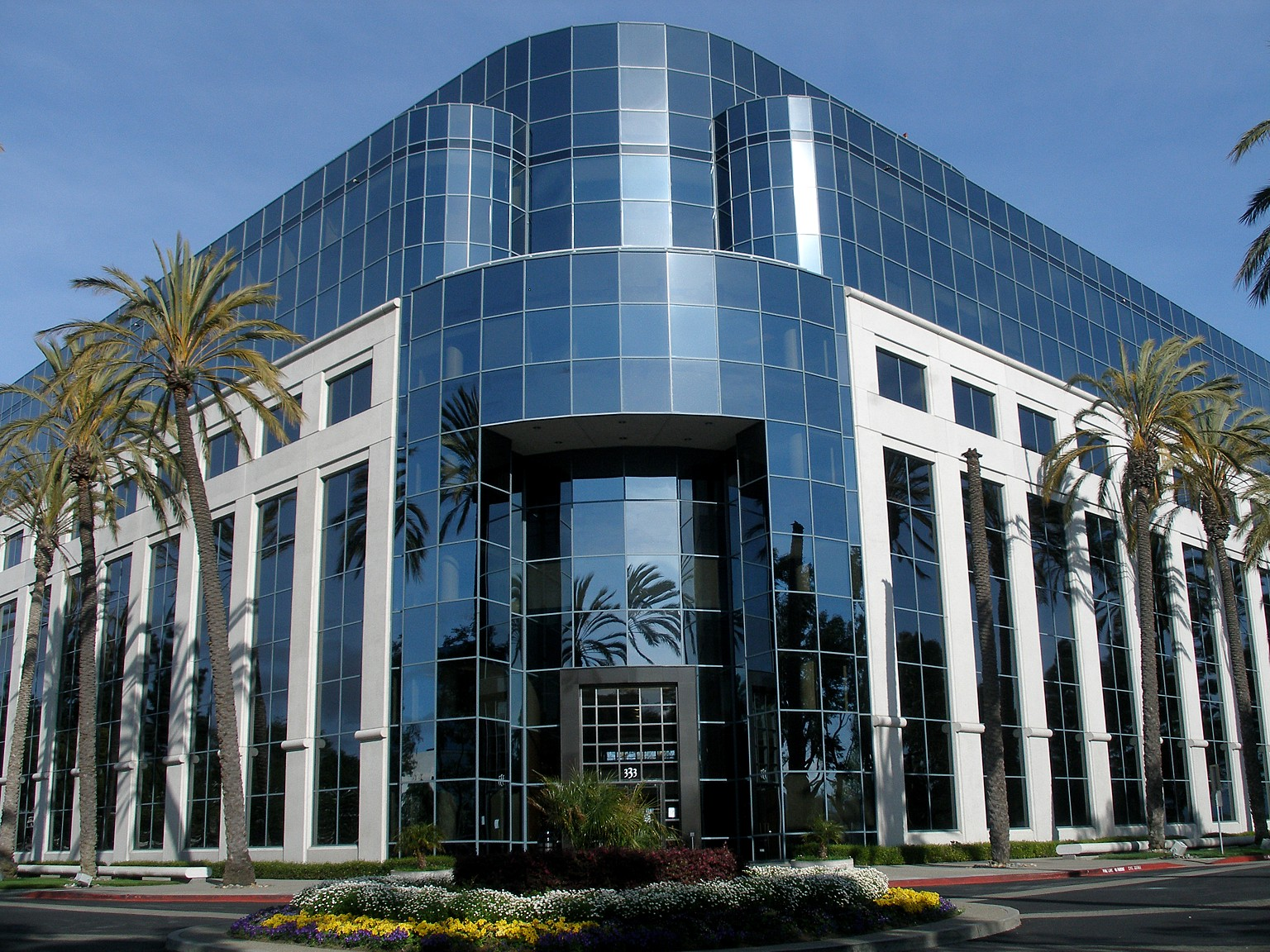
- Former headquarters in Redwood Shores, California
- Formation: 1981
- Headquarters: Burlingame, California, United States
- Owner: ACCO Brands
- Website: kensington.com
- Formerly called: Kensington Microware Limited (–c. 2000); Kensington Technology Group (division name, –c. 2012)

Kensington Computer Products Group is an American manufacturer of personal computer peripherals. The company produces peripherals including docking stations, mice, and cable locks for laptops and other devices. Headquartered in Burlingame, California, Kensington is a division of ACCO Brands.

== History ==
Logo until 2002

Co-founded by Philip Damiano as Kensington Microware in 1981, their first product was called the System Saver, an accessory for the Apple IIe that added a cooling fan and surge protection. In 1986, the company was acquired by ACCO Brands. Kensington's first trackball mouse was the Turbo Mouse for Macintosh released in 1986 and trackballs have since been one of the major offerings by the company. Their first laptop physical security lock was made in 1992.

Kensington also produced accessories for portable devices like the iPod, including the Stereo Dock in 2005.

== Products ==
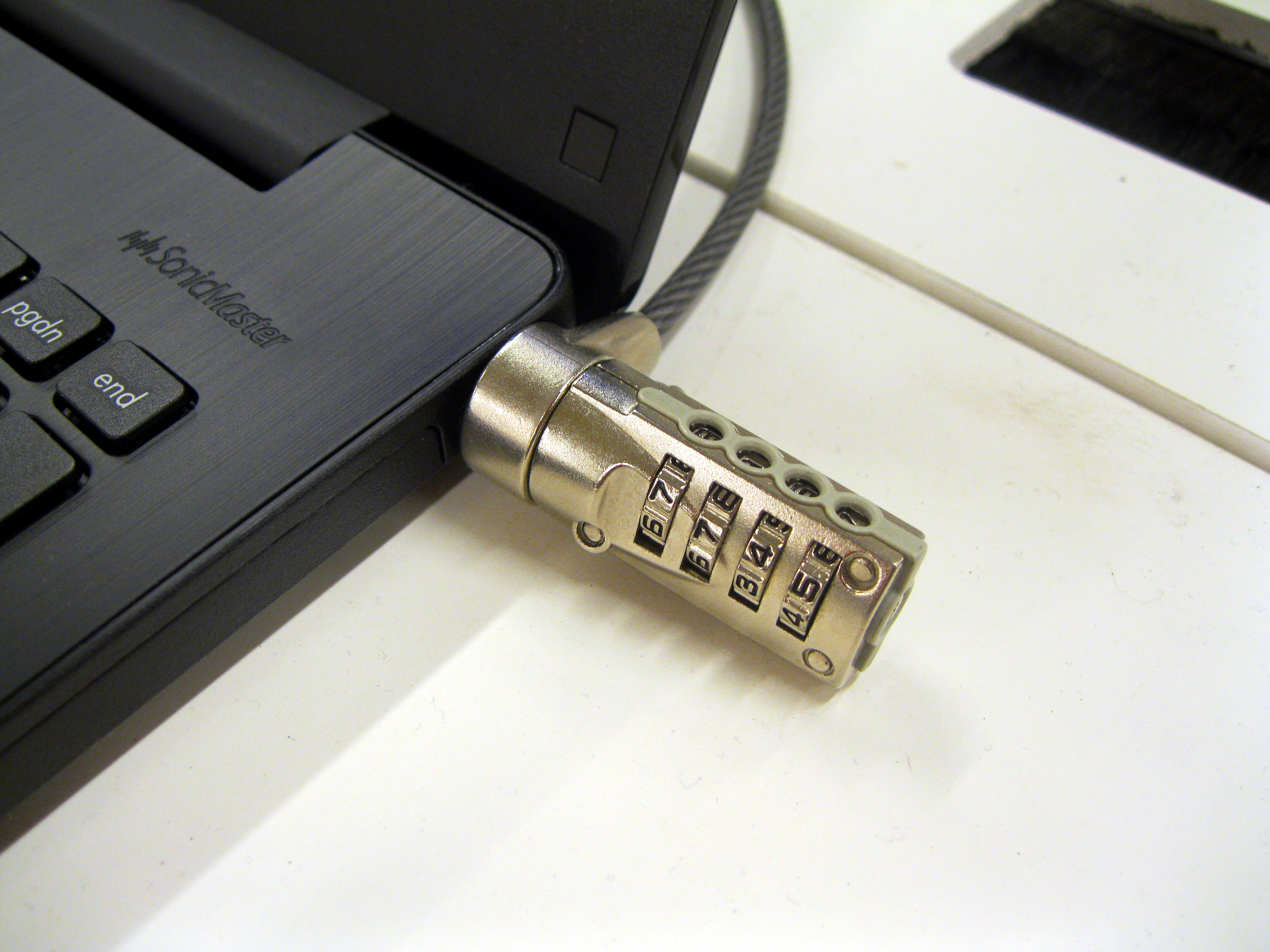
Kensington lock

Kensington primarily sells computer accessories, such as mice and keyboards as well as power supplies and anti-theft systems for computers and electronic devices. They have also made cases for laptops and other consumer electronics, such as the KeyFolio Expert protective case for iPad. The use of the accessories is aimed at both fixed and mobile workstations.

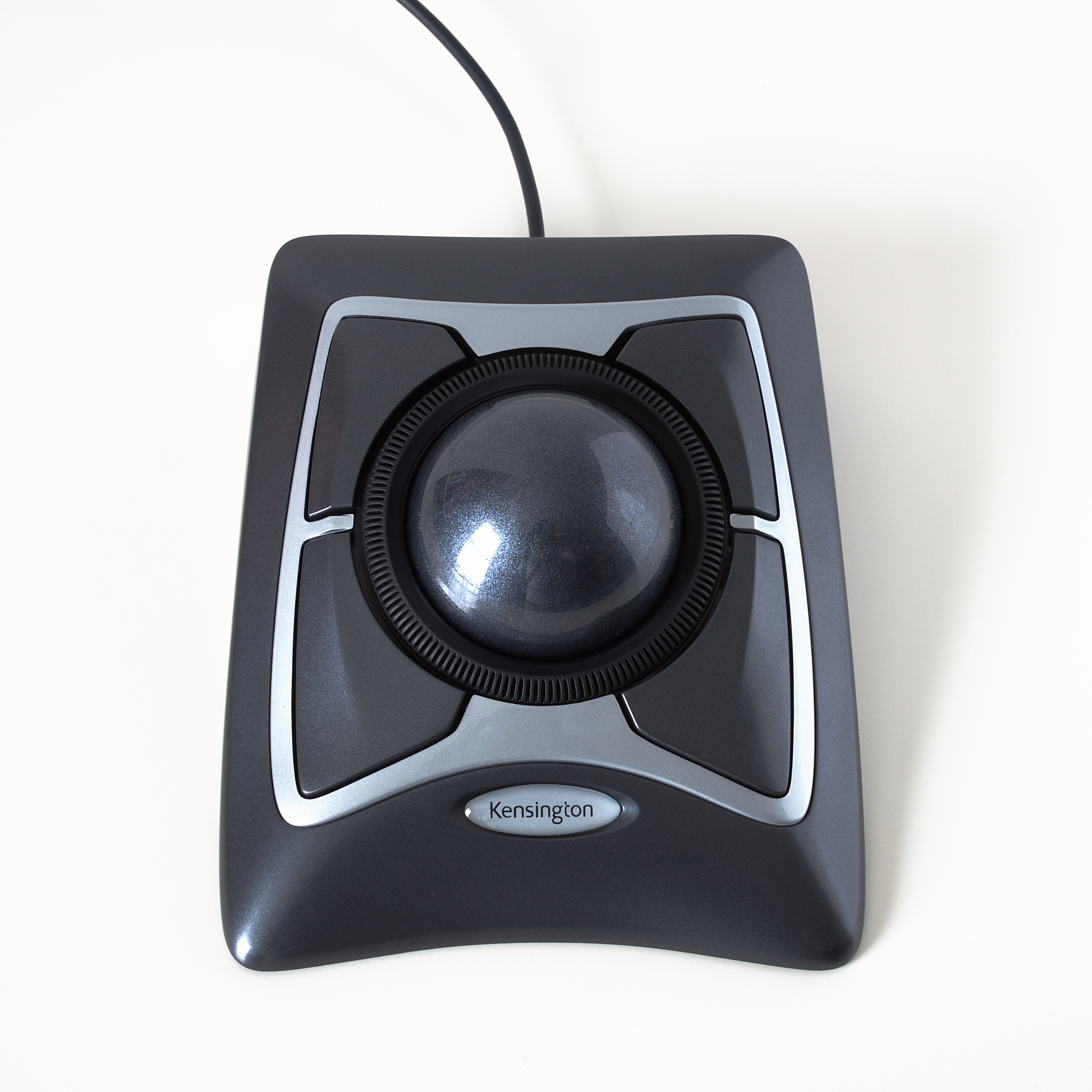
Kensington Expert Mouse Wired Trackball

The company offers the Kensington Lock, an anti-theft system for laptops and other peripherals, together with a range of individual locking systems with various options to secure computing devices such as laptops, desktops, projectors, TFTs and external hard drives.
