= Spindler =

Spindler or Špindler (English, German and Jewish (Ashkenazic): occupational name for a spindle maker) is a surname. Notable people with the surname include:

- Amy Spindler (1963–2004), American journalist
- Angela Spindler, British businesswoman, CEO of The Original Factory Shop
- Betty Spindler (born 1943), American ceramist
- Charles Spindler (1865–1938), Alsatian painter, marquetry inlayer, writer and photographer
- Erica Spindler (born 1957), American author
- Fritz Spindler (1817–1905), German pianist and composer
- George Spindler, American anthropologist
- Herbert Spindler (born 1954), Austrian former cyclist
- James C. Spindler, American lawyer and law professor
- Jaroslav Špindler (1890–1965), Bohemian-Austrian footballer
- Johanne Spindler (1781–1861), Danish ballet dancer and stage actress
- Karl Spindler (naval officer) (1887–1951), German naval officer who was involved in an attempt to bring German arms ashore in Ireland in 1916
- Karl Spindler (novelist) (1796–1855), German novelist
- Konrad Spindler (1939-2005), Austrian archaeologist
- Ludwig Spindler, German World War II Waffen-SS officer
- Marc Spindler (born 1969), American retired National Football League player
- Michael Spindler (1942–2016), German manager and CEO of Apple Computer, Inc.
- Nellie Spindler (1891–1917), British nurse killed during the First World War Battle of Passchendaele
- Rocco Spindler (born 2002), American football player
- Sid Spindler (1932–2008), Australian politician
- Sybille Spindler, East German former slalom canoeist who competed in the 1970s
- William Spindler (born 1963), Guatemalan writer and journalist

== See also ==
- Špindlerův Mlýn (German: Spindlermühle), town in the Czech Republic
