= Spindal =

Spindal and similar may refer to:

- Kahdal Spindal, character in Biomega (manga)
- Spindale, North Carolina, U.S.
- Spindel, a surname
- Spindle (disambiguation)
