= Spindle =

Spindle may refer to:

== Textiles and manufacturing ==
- Spindle (textiles), a straight spike to spin fibers into yarn
- Spindle (tool), a rotating axis of a machine tool

== Biology ==
- Common spindle and other species of shrubs and trees in genus Euonymus whose hard wood was used to make spindles
- Spindle apparatus or mitotic spindle, a cellular structure in cell biology
- Muscle spindle, stretch receptors within the body of a muscle
- Spindle neuron, a specific class of neuron
- Sleep spindle, bursts of neural oscillatory activity during sleep
- Spindle transfer, an in vitro fertilization technique (also known as Mitochondrial replacement therapy)

== Computing ==
- Spindle (hard disk drive), the axis of a hard disk drive
- Spindle (disc packaging), a plastic case for bulk optical disks

== Vehicles ==
- Spindle (automobile), a part of a car's suspension system
- Spindle (vehicle), an autonomous ice-penetrating vehicle

== Other uses ==
- Spindle (furniture), cylindrically symmetric shaft, usually made of wood
- Spindle (sculpture), a 1989 sculpture by Dustin Shuler made from cars
- Spindle (stationery), an upright spike used to hold papers
- Spindle, part of a door handle
- Spindle Rock, also called Adrachti, a rock in Meteora, Greece
- Spindle, an alternative term for a bicone

== See also ==
- Fusiform, having a spindle-like shape
- Rotation around a fixed axis
- Spindel, a surname
- Spindler, a surname
- Spindling, in computing
- The Spindles (disambiguation)
