= Edward Meshekoff =

American artist

Edward Meshekoff (1917 in Bronx, New York City – 2010) was an American artist, illustrator and designer.

A graduate of the University of California, Los Angeles, Meshekoff worked and lived in both Los Angeles and New York City.

In 1957, Meshekoff designed a pair of mosaic map murals depicting New York City's five boroughs. These murals were installed on the walls of a newly built Information Center located on a traffic island in the center of Times Square. In more recent years, the building has served as an NYPD police substation. As of 2016, Meshekoff's mosaic maps were scheduled for restoration and relocation to a new, yet-to-be determined location.

His commissions included the design of a children's playroom aboard the SS United States, illustrations for a 1952 children's book, The Little Car That Wanted a Garage, wall murals, and decorative design elements such as a sculpted overdoor sailing ship. Meshekoff also collaborated with Philip Johnson on larger projects, including the south building of Lincoln Center, (formerly known as The NY State Theater, home to the NYC Ballet) and The Kreeger Museum. Additionally, he was commissioned by other notable architects, including Alfred Easton Poor.
