= Factory Shop =

Factory Shop may refer to:

- The Original Factory Shop, a chain of department stores in the United Kingdom
- An outlet store
