= Overdoor =

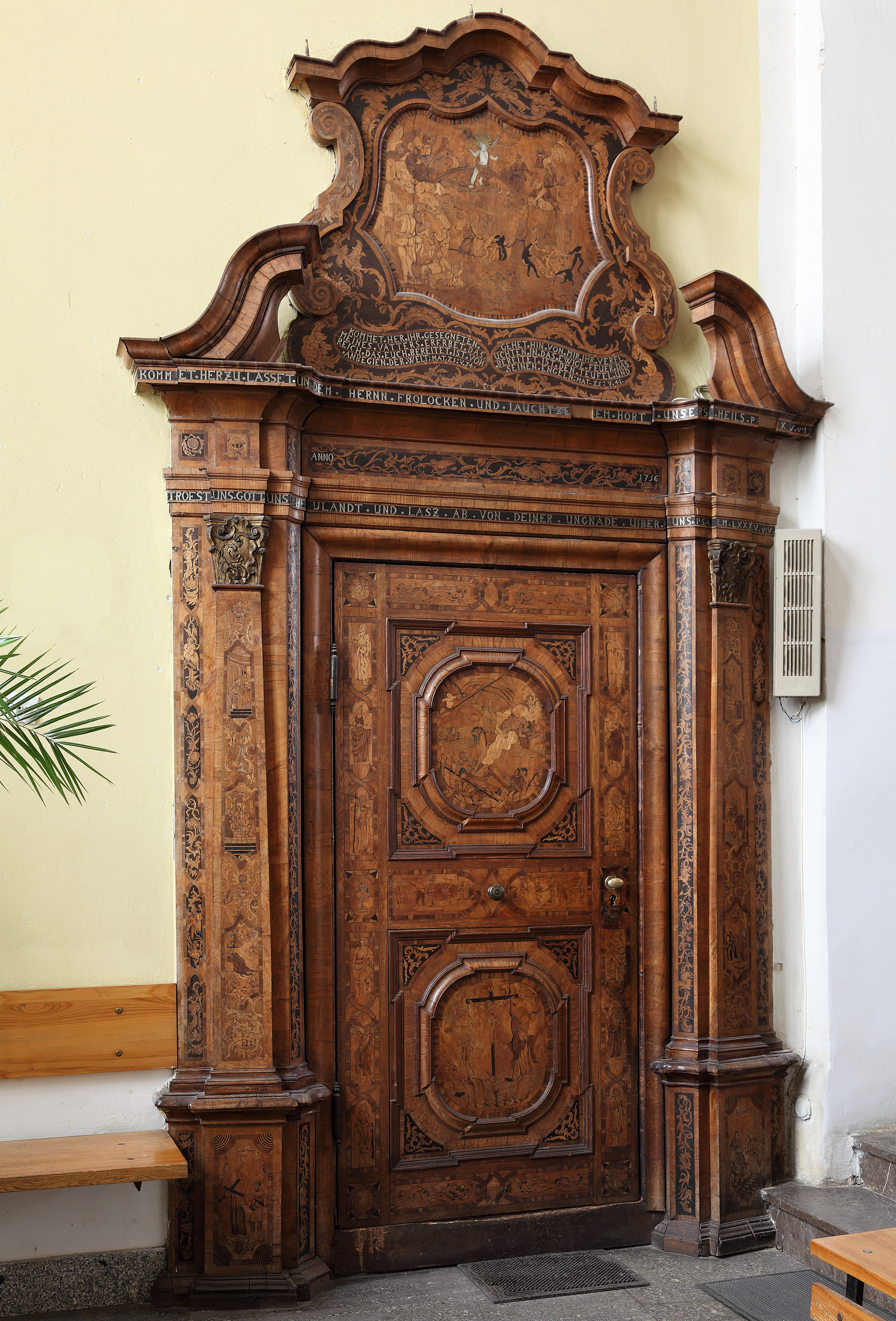
Carved and inlaid Late Baroque supraporte in Toruń, Poland

An "overdoor" (or "Supraporte" as in German, or "sopraporte" as in Italian) is a painting, bas-relief or decorative panel, generally in a horizontal format, that is set, typically within ornamental mouldings, over a door, or was originally intended for this purpose.

== Description ==
The overdoor is usually architectural in form, but may take the form of a cartouche in Rococo settings, or it may be little more than a moulded shelf for the placement of ceramic vases, busts or curiosities. An overmantel serves a similar function above a fireplace mantel.

From the end of the 16th century, at first in interiors such as the Palazzo Sampieri, Bologna, where Annibale Carracci provided overdoor paintings, they developed into a minor genre of their own, in which the trompe-l'œil representations of stone bas-reliefs, or vases of flowers, in which Jean-Baptiste Monnoyer specialized, were heightened by sotto in su perspective, in which the light was often painted to reproduce the light, diffused from below, that was entering the room from its windows. Overdoors of such flower pieces, allegorical subjects, and landscapes were favoured through the end of the 18th century.

French, Dutch and Flemish animalier artists such as Jean-Baptiste Oudry and Jan Weenix were often commissioned to paint sets of overdoors with groups of live or dead game and dogs for country houses or hunting lodges.

== See also ==
- Folding door
- Maud Eastwood
