= Bramah =

Bramah is a surname. Notable people with the surname include:

- Ernest Bramah (1868–1942), English author
- John Joseph Bramah (1798–1846), English ironmaster and engineer
- Joseph Bramah (1748–1814), English ironmaster and inventor, uncle of John Joseph Bramah
- Martin Bramah (born 1957), British musician
