= Door handle bacteria =

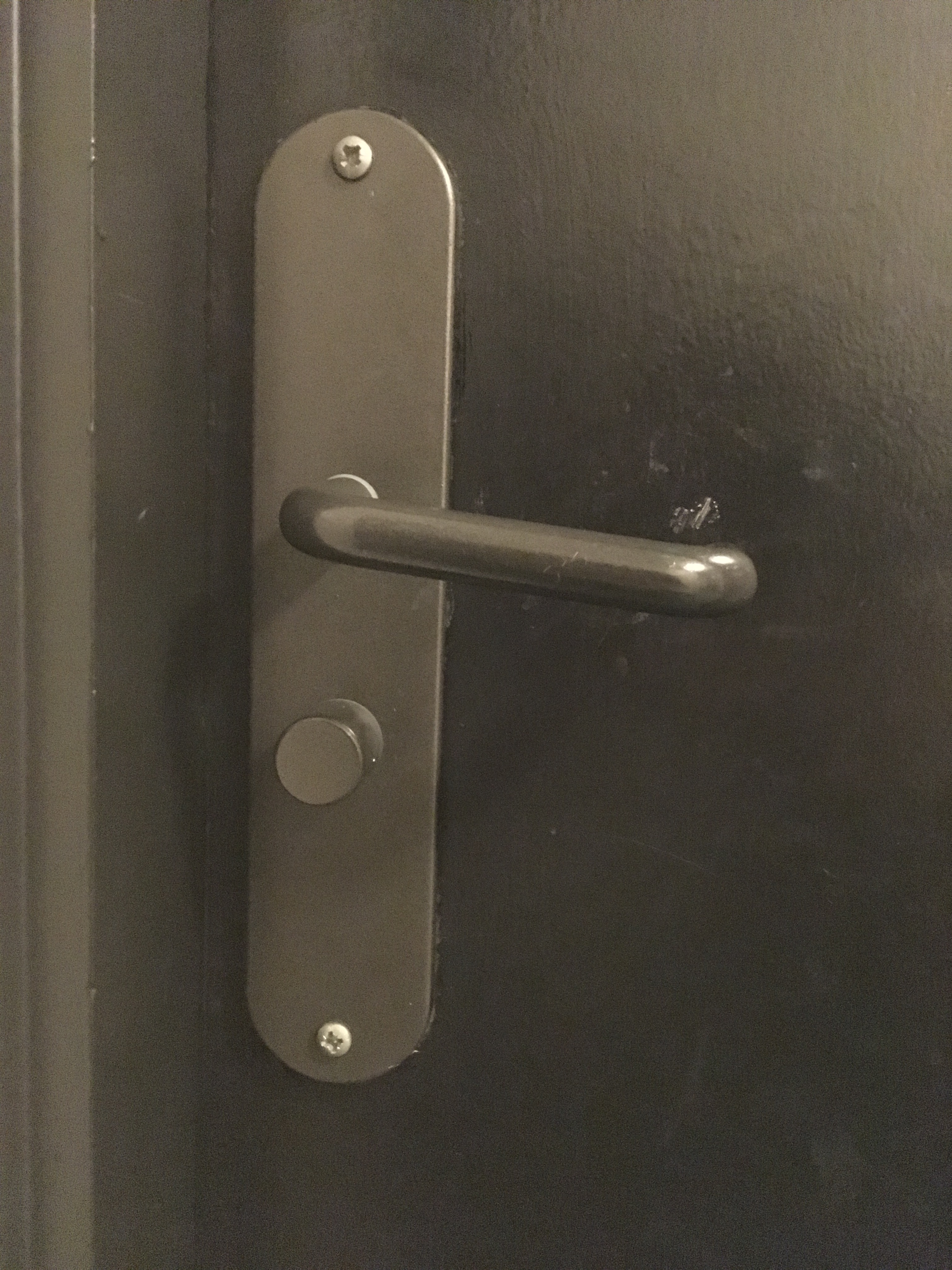
A typical door handle

Because door handles are commonplace and are interacted with by large numbers of people on a daily basis, they present opportunities for growth of bacterial colonies.

Many factors determine the habitability of a door handle for a population of bacteria. The material of the handle itself contributes to the growth of bacteria, with most door handles being constructed of stainless steel – a suitable home for bacteria. The material can affect the time bacteria can survive on door handles, but more important is the temperature and humidity of the environment. A hospitable environment can allow bacteria to thrive for anywhere from a few hours to a few weeks on a surface.

A crucial factor in the bacterial growth and spread is the location of the handle. A low-touch handle, such as that of a rarely opened closet will have significantly fewer bacteria than the high-touch handles in a busy public bathroom due to the frequency of contact with people's hands. Door handles in locations where elderly people or immune compromised people frequent should be cleaned frequently.

== Precautions and preventions ==
The most common way to prevent the contraction and spread of direct contact diseases is to try not to touch door handles at all, this may not be always possible. A door may be held open with a device such as a door holder or door closer, which can automatically release the door upon the sound of a fire alarm and protect a building in the event of a fire.

An ultraviolet door handle attendant can be installed to sterilize the existing handle. Automatic door handle sanitisers are used mainly in hospitals. These units spray a tiny amount of sanitiser onto the door handle after each use.

Automatic doors are also becoming more and more popular in hospitals, chemists and other public buildings due to them reducing the risk of contamination since there is no need to handle the door at all. Another prevention technique, which is mainly used in luxury hotels, is the use of a doorman who will open and close the main door, screening visitors and deliveries. These mean passers through do not have to touch the door at all therefore eliminating all risk of catching or passing on direct contact diseases. Precautionary measures which can be taken in order to prevent such diseases include wearing gloves, using paper towel or tissues to open handles or using tools, like the Loodini, to avoid using door handles all together.

The primary risk with touching a door handle is the subsequent transfer of bacteria into the body through the mouth, nose or eyes by touching the face. With this in mind, handles have been developed that can be operated using the forearm or the foot.

== Types of bacteria ==
Door handles provides a suitable environment for bacteria to spread easily, this makes it a hotspot for bacteria to gather and create colonies.

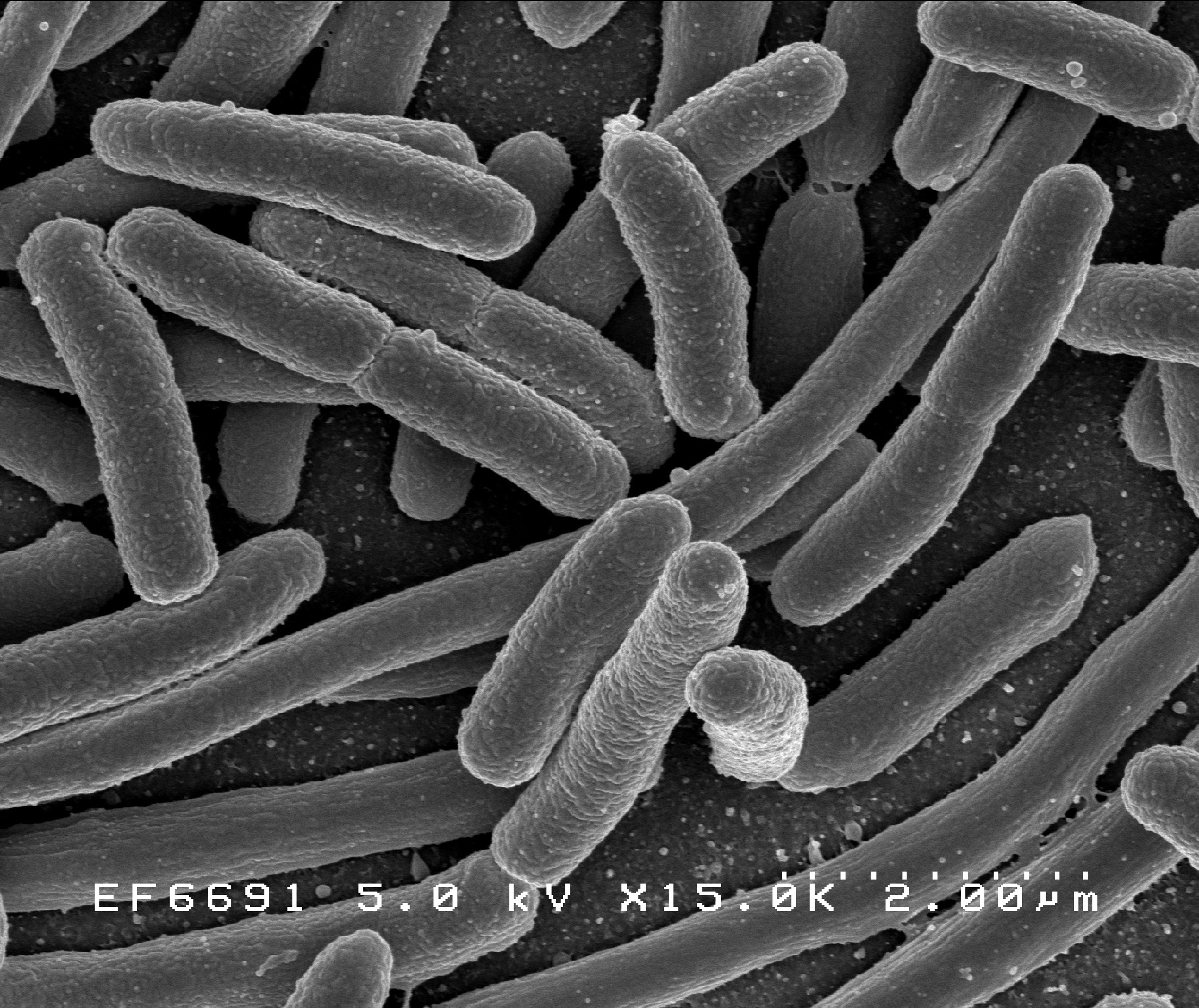
E Coli Bacteria Escherichia coli.

A 2016 study by the Worcester Polytechnic Institute (WPI) studied 1,323 bacterial colonies among 27 door handles. The study was conducted on the university campus, an area fairly dense in population, where many people access the doors, providing a host for the bacteria to travel elsewhere. Flu viruses can have the potential to last up to 24 hours on door handles.

Over this period of time, this allows the bacteria to further spread, and onto other door handles. This bacteria on exposure can be harmful to humans, potentially infecting us with diseases such as E. coli, fungal or other viral infections. Many people may forget the potential for bacteria to thrive on door handles, and after exposure may touch their face, or other places that may lead to ingesting it into their body. The WPI study used a hidden camera, discovering that 86 of 1,060 people touched their face after exposure with the door handle within 35 minutes.

== External factors influencing bacteria ==
=== Material ===
The material the door handle is made from, can play a significant part in the growth of bacteria. Different materials can mean the difference between a handle that is riddled with microorganisms or bacteria free. One experiment studied a stainless steel plate – which is what most door handles are currently made from – and a copper plate, coating them both with 10 million cells each of MRSA. Bacteria thrived on the stainless steel plates while the natural antibacterial properties of copper worked both directly and indirectly to destroy the bacteria. “The direct effect comes from the release of copper ions which degrade the DNA of a cell and inhibit its respiration. The indirect effect is even more rapid. On a dry surface, copper interacts with the bacteria's metabolism to generate very potent free radicals, which are even quicker than copper itself at destroying the DNA and inhibiting respiration.” Tests have shown that copper is effective against superbugs like MRSA C difficile, and other dangerous germs like the flu virus and E. coli.

=== Temperature ===
All bacteria have a certain optimum temperature to which they thrive. Door handles do not provide the best conditions for most bacteria to grow. Its subjection to room temperature (around 20 degrees Celsius) and dry surface means most bacteria are not likely to survive for more than 8 hours. There are exceptions like MRSA bacteria that can thrive on door handles surviving for days to weeks without any moisture at room temperature. Similarly, for pH, there is an optimum range for bacteria to grow faster. Generally speaking, bacteria grows the quickest in the pH range 6–8 and for MRSA specifically, 7.4–7.6.

=== Location ===
Just like all the factors above, the actual place where the door handles are located is crucial when it comes to the life expectancy of bacteria. Handles in public places, e.g. bathrooms, toilets and front doors, are most likely to spread disease because these places come in contact with people’s hands most frequently, transferring a wide variety of germs onto them. On the other hand, there are places like ordination rooms and laboratories where bacteria is unlikely to survive. However, despite being kept clean and sanitised, there is still a possibility of infective organisms.

=== Knobs vs. handles ===
Since bacteria likes wet and humid surroundings, the type of the handle – whether it is a lever or a knob – makes a difference. Depending on the size and material, the life conditions for bacteria differ. While door handles are usually made of metal, doorknobs, in the past, tended to be wooden, meaning they can absorb and retain dampness for a longer time making the perfect conditions for germs and bacteria to thrive. However, most modern door knobs, at least in the United States, tend to be made of metal. Although the commonly shaped metal handles can be more easily cleaned as they have a more wipeable surface, round knobs have a smaller size which mean a smaller area for the bacteria to live on.

== Notable diseases ==
=== Common cold ===
One of the most common diseases caused by door handle bacteria is the common cold. Since the virus is spread mostly by direct contact with an object or surface that has been contaminated followed by subsequent touching of the face, the everyday dangers are obvious. The symptoms become apparent a few days after the patient is infected and the following ones are the most recognizable: sore throat, runny nose, cough and sneezing. A statistic shows that on average 13,738,175 people in the United Kingdom suffer from common cold. By this number Britain has the largest number of infections of all countries in Western Europe.

=== Meningitis ===
Meningitis is the swelling of the membranes around the spinal cord and brain most often caused by viral and bacterial infection which incidentally are the only two types which could be passed through contact with door handles. Although relatively rare, meningitis can be life-threatening with rapidly developing symptoms. Bacterial meningitis is the deadliest form of this disease but throughout the years, as people have become more aware of the disease and its causes, the number of deaths due to meningitis each year has significantly decreased. As children are more at risk of contracting meningitis, recommended vaccines have been put in place across the UK for the three main bacteria types: Neisseria meningitides, Streptococcus pneumoniae and Haemophilus influenzae type b (Hib).

=== Swine flu ===
Swine flu is one of many diseases that are contracted by person to person contact. In April 2009, the virus was discovered in the USA, and 2 months later in June, the CDC announced the disease as a pandemic. It is believed that door handles provide a suitable environment for the disease to spread on, as the virus can survive on these metallic surfaces from 2 to up to 8 hours. Door handles provide a medium for the disease to spread as every person uses the handle, they can extend the duration that the microorganisms survive.

=== Calicivirus ===
The calicivirus, which causes the very common stomach flu, can live for days or weeks, depending on the surrounding conditions. This virus belongs to the family Caliciviridae, which includes other viruses such as:

- Norovirus, a common cause of food poisoning and acute gastroenteritis in humans;
- Sapovirus, formerly called "Sapporo-like virus" (SLV) and sometimes referred to as classic or typical calicivirus, which can also cause gastroenteritis in humans;
- Vesivirus, the swine vesicular exanthema virus; and
- Lagovirus, the rabbit haemorrhagic disease virus.

Each of these viruses can survive for various durations, depending on the surrounding conditions (room temperature, humidity, etc.) on door handles. While most of these can be prevented through simple hand washing, in public places this is much more difficult, resulting in significant spread.
