= Door handle =

Device to open or close door

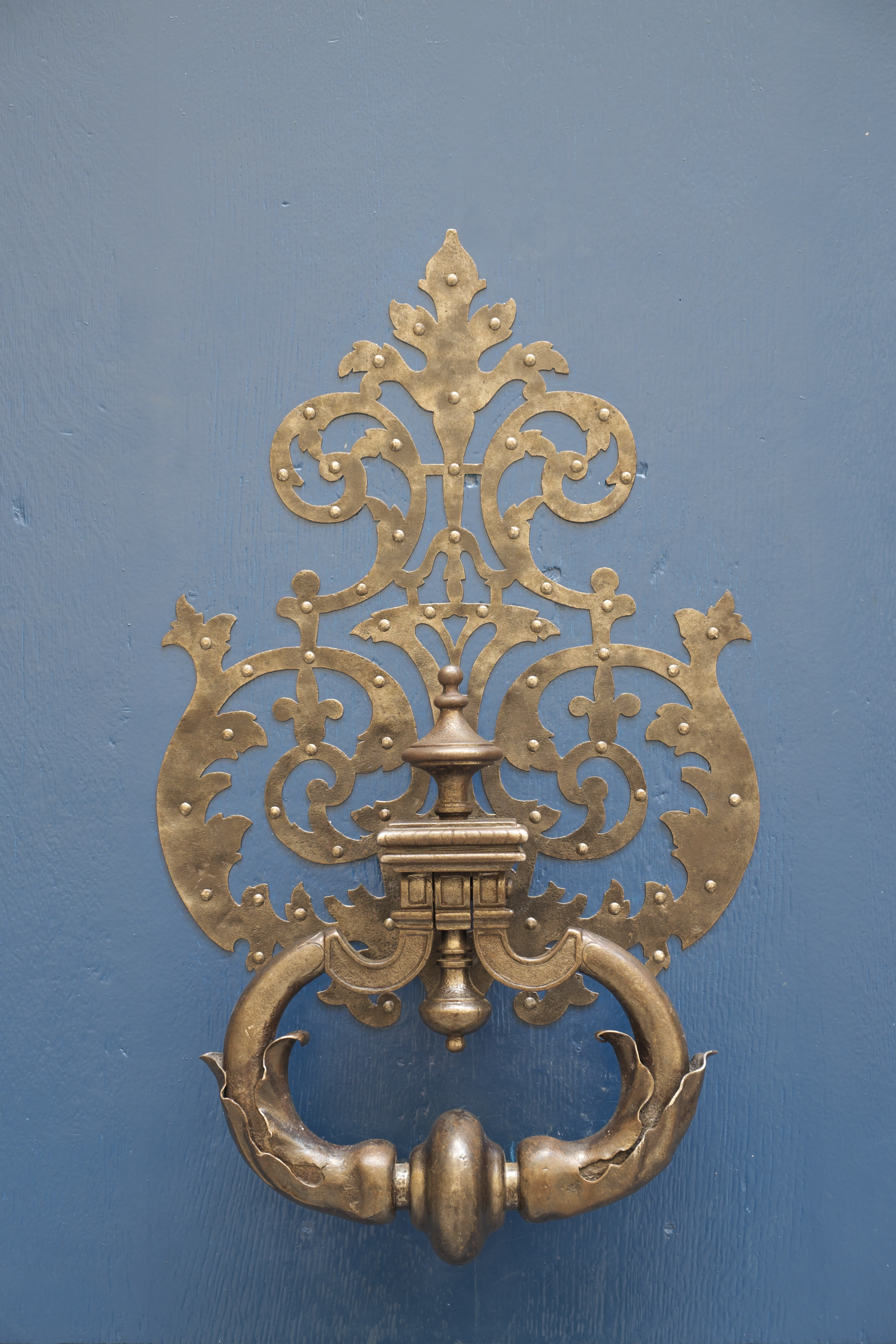
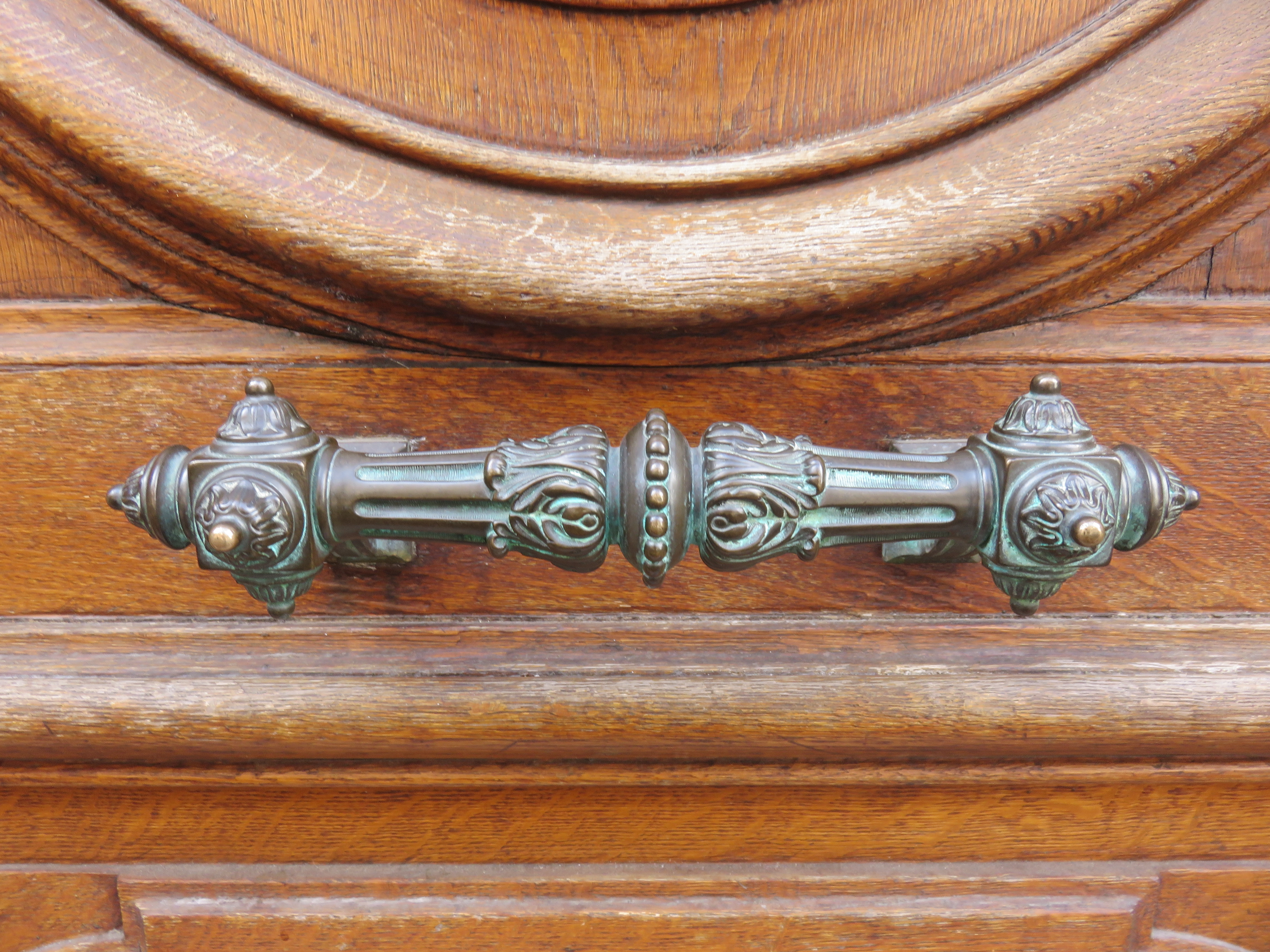
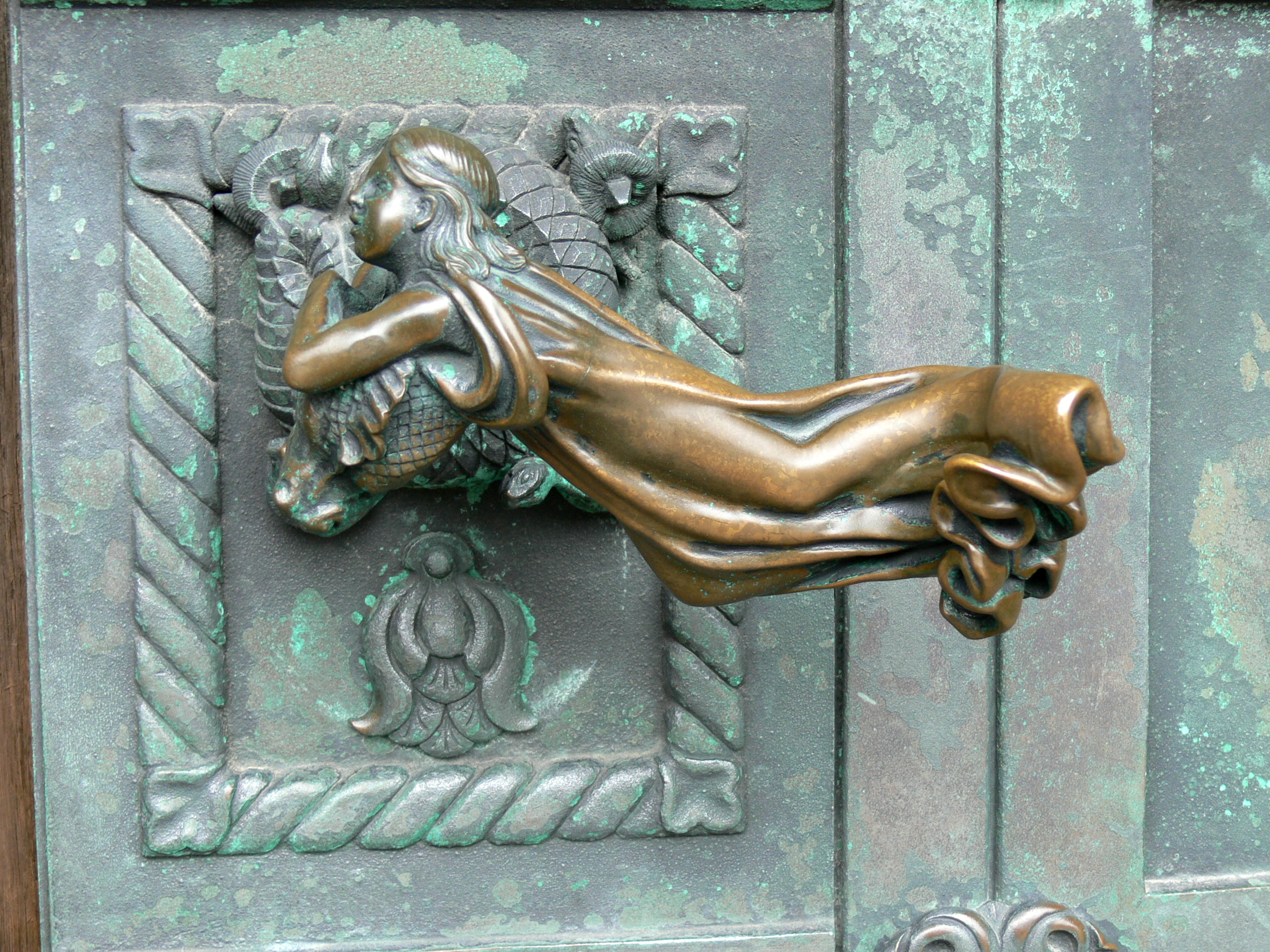
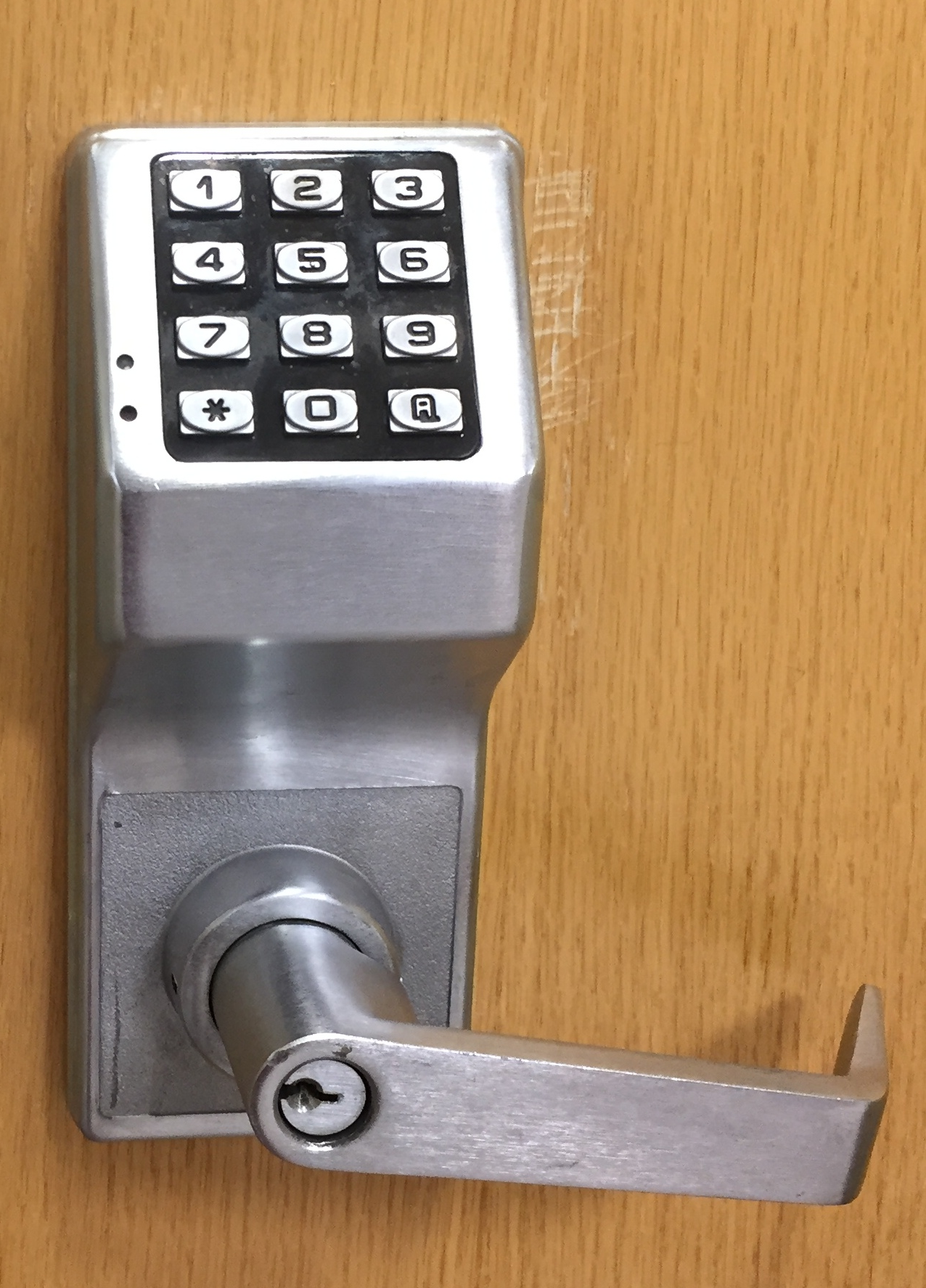
Various examples of door handles throughout history

A door handle or doorknob is a handle used to open or close a door. Door handles can be found on all types of doors including: exterior doors of residential and commercial buildings, internal doors, cupboard doors and vehicle doors. There are many designs of door handle, depending on the appropriate use. A large number of handles, particularly for commercial and residential doors, incorporate latching or locking mechanisms or are manufactured to fit to standardised door locking or latching mechanisms.

The most common types of door handle are the lever handle and the doorknob. Door handles can be made out of a plethora of materials. Examples include brass, porcelain, cut glass, wood, and bronze. Door handles have been in existence for at least 5000 years, and its design has evolved since, with more advanced mechanism, types, and designs made.

Some door handles are also arm- or foot-operated to reduce transmission of contagious illnesses.

== Types ==
Pull handle

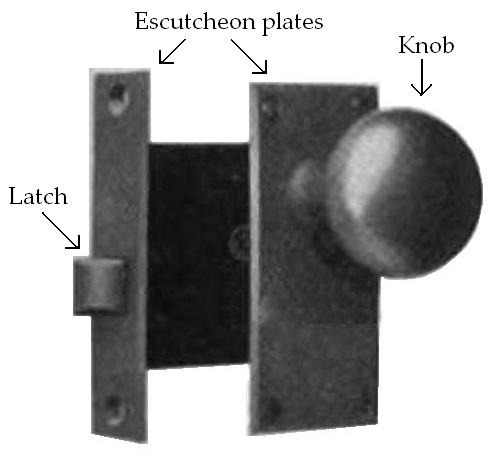

- The most common type of door handle is the lever latch or latch door handle, often found in residential houses and commercial and public buildings. Doors fitted with this handle have a latch that keeps the door shut. The door handle has only a lever handle or knob which operates this latch. Pushing the handle down rotates the spindle, operating the tubular latch mechanism inside the door, allowing it to be opened. This type of door handle is used on interior doors that do not need to be locked. The doorknob has a spindle running through it that sits just above a cylinder, to which the spindle is connected. Pushing the lever or turning the knob pulls the cylinder in the direction of the turn. The end of the cylinder is the "latch bolt" (more simply known as the "latch"), which protrudes into a space carved out of the door frame, and which prevents the door from being opened if the knob is not turned. A spring or similar mechanism causes the latch to return to its protruding state whenever the knob is not being turned.
- The lever lock door handle on a backplate is another type of door handle which operates similarly to the lever latch door handle. This type of handle on a backplate consists of a lever with a keyhole cut just below it. This allows a key to be inserted into the door to control a mortice sash lock. Just the like the lever latch, the door can be opened and shut by pushing the handle, but it can also be locked with a key. This locking mechanism is used on doors which can be opened by turning the handle if not locked, but can also be locked, requiring a key to open them.
- The lever bathroom is typically used on bathroom doors, as they can be locked and unlocked easily from the inside by turning the snib, but in an emergency, they can be opened from the outside by fitting a coin or similar object into a slot and rotating it. This lock is fitted with a mortice sash attached to a 5mm spindle which passes through the door.
- The lever privacy is functionally similar to the Lever Bathroom in that it is locked by turning a snib on the inside and can be unlocked from the outside in emergencies. Unlike the Lever Bathroom, there is no mortice sash; locking is achieved by jamming the lever in a closed position.
- Pull door handles or simply pull handles are U-shaped, and are typically used in kitchens and on drawers. They are usually made of stainless steel.

== History ==
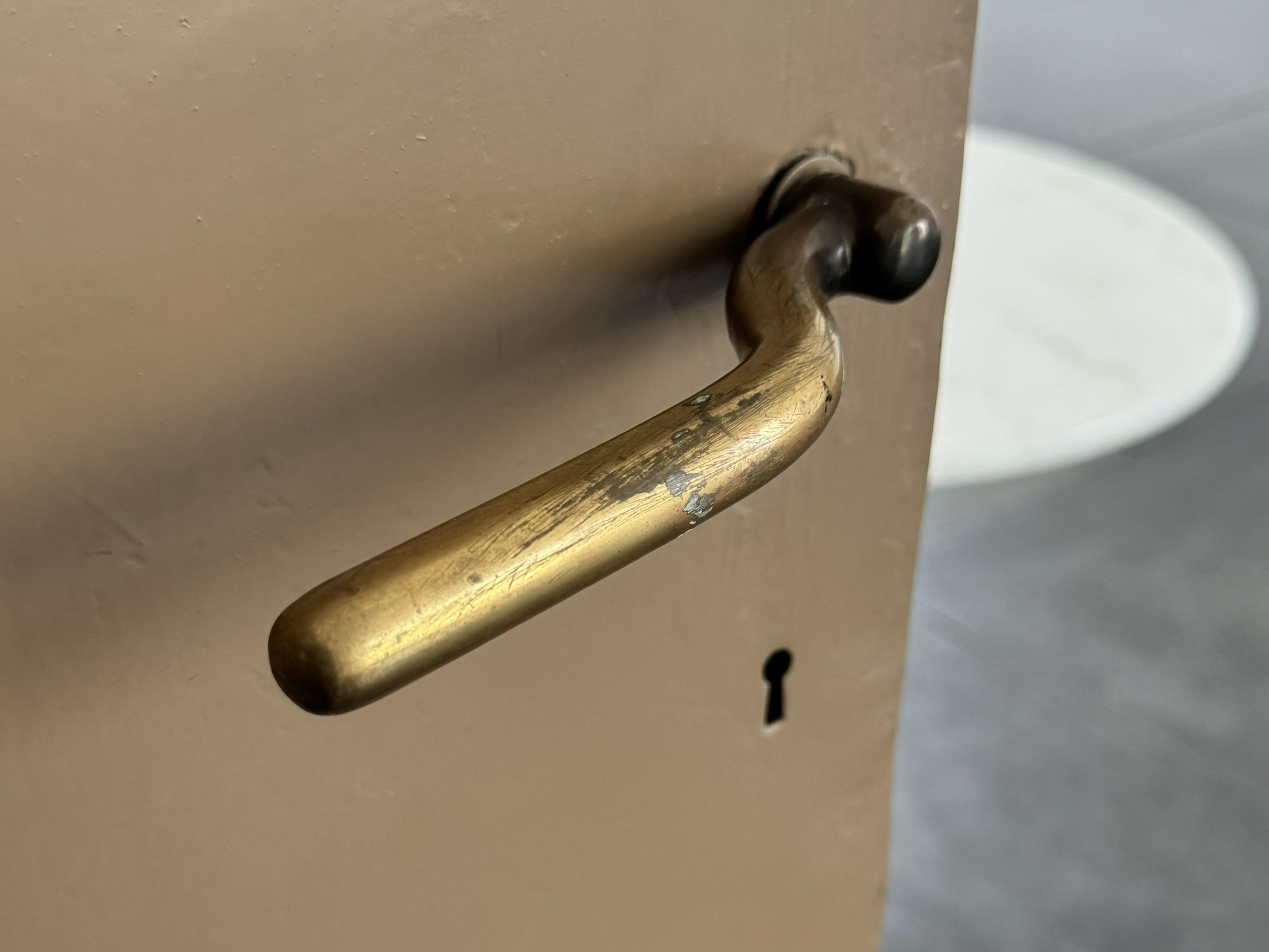
A door handle designed by Ludwig Wittgenstein in Haus Wittgenstein, Vienna (1927)

Door handles have been in existence at least since the Neolithic period. Locking or latching mechanisms have existed from about the same time. Key operated door locks have existed at least since Egyptian civilisation. The keys of these locks, which could be as large as two feet long, also functioned as door handles to slide a locking bolt and open the door. Subsequently Roman domuses and insulae incorporated lockable doors of a different design but also opened by a combined handle/key. Although available, these key lockable doors were relatively rare. Houses were almost always occupied so most lockable doors would feature a sliding bolt or a drop-in bar that allowed the building to be locked from the inside. The bolt or bar bracket acted as a handle. Although interior doors were less common in Rome than in modern buildings, the Romans had recognisably modern interior doors including door handles. Doors excavated from Lake Nemi and dated to around 1st century CE feature knob-shaped handles.

In Asia, China by the 4th century CE was producing a range of automated doors, door locks and door bars.

There is little record of door handle development between the Fall of Rome and about 1000 CE. The oldest European doors include the Bernward Doors and the "Pyx door" of Westminster Abbey. The Bernward doors have large decorative ring-shaped handles of a type that became common on decorated doors from that period onwards. The Westminster Abbey door features a sliding bolt that can also function as a handle. From at least the Middle Ages blacksmiths made drop latches which could be opened by a handle connected to the latch by a split pin passing through the door. Taking the form of a ring or strip, these handles could be elaborate and decorated but were universally made of metal. It can be speculated that since the task of making door hardware fell to the blacksmith, the use of turned or carved wooden knobs was not convenient. Wooden latches are also known from this period. A finger hole could be made that allowed the user to raise the latch from the other side of the door. The finger hole would double as a grip or handle. In another common design, transferred motion to open the latch was effected by a string passing through the door, which could be withdrawn from the inside to effectively lock the door to outsiders. In this case the door might also have a basic handle carved or turned from wood.

From about mid-17th century, drop handles were increasingly replaced by forged vertical handles formed as a bracket fixed to the door at the top and bottom of the bracket. Vertical handles with an incorporated latch mechanism, known as Suffolk latches were developed. By the mid-18th century, forged vertical handles were being replaced by cast vertical handles, including the Norfolk latch.

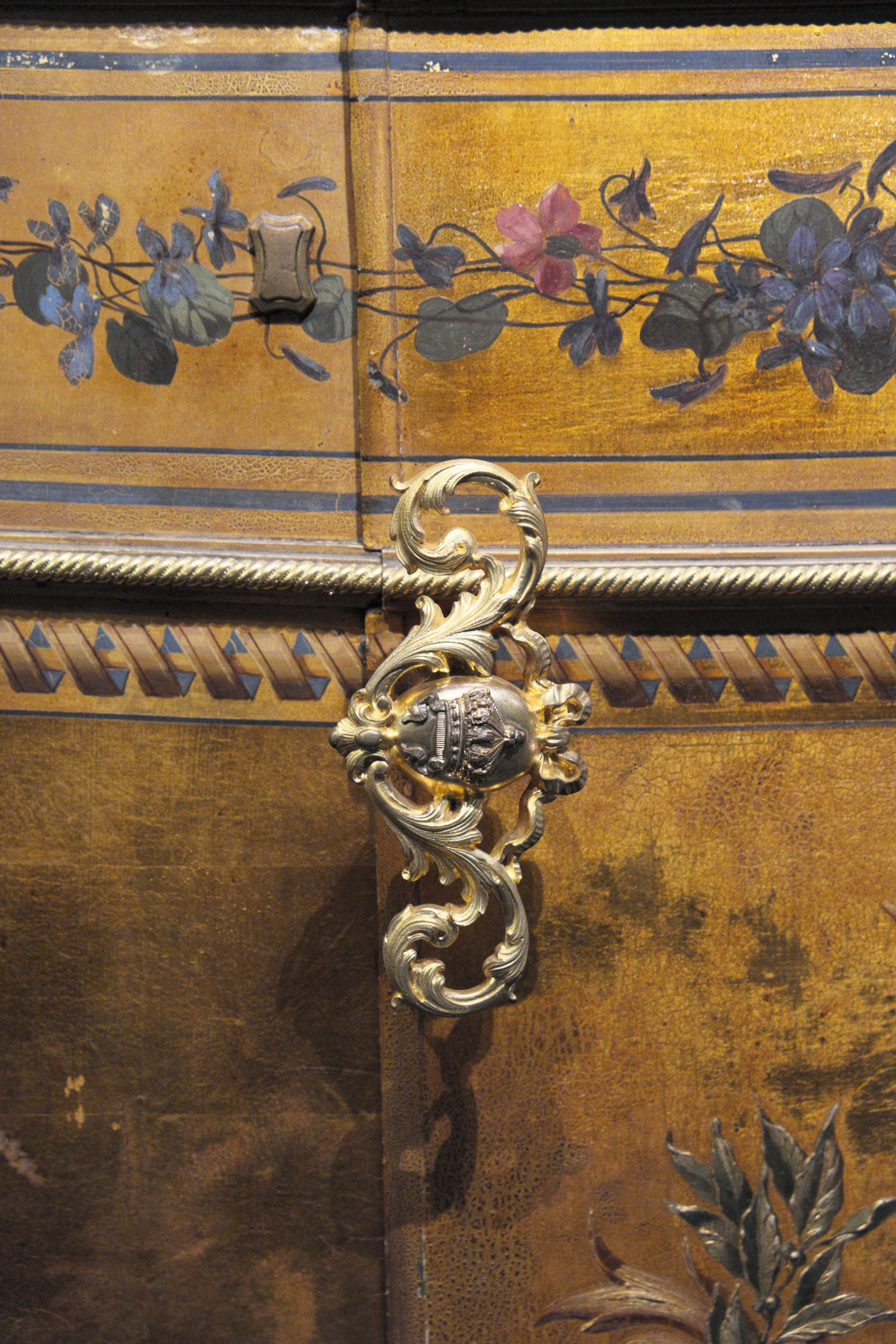
Door handle of Napoleon's coronation coach by Jean-Ernest-Auguste Getting (c. 1804)

The early 17th century also saw metalworking of a standard that allowed mortise locks and latches and compact rim locks and latches to be made for use in the most expensive buildings. These locks used a twisting motion to operate, accelerating development in decorative doorknobs. The Industrial Revolution dramatically reduced the cost of lock and latch manufacture with lock designers including Barronin, Chubb and Bramah competing against each other around the end of the 18th century. From the 18th century, a wide variety of lever handles and knobs started to be produced, with designs determined by local aesthetic preference and technology. Knobs could be cast, turned, brazed or spun from a variety of materials. Levers could be wrought or cast. Designs became more complicated and might include a rose or escutcheon plate.

Until about 1830 door handle manufacture in the western world was almost entirely European. In 1838 the US was importing between 80 and 95% of its door handles. Between 1830 and 1876, the date of the Centennial Exposition, door handle manufacture grew rapidly in the US; more than 100 patents were filed for door handle and doorknob improvements in that time. This period also saw glass doorknobs appear as a major part of the industry thanks to improvements in the pressed glass manufacturing process. Cut glass knobs were also popular from the time of the Centennial Exposition to about 1910.

From the early 20th century architects and designers started to take serious interest in door handles as part of a comprehensive vision of spaces for living. In 1927 Ludwig Wittgenstein designed a door handle which has become a prototype for curved tubular handles since then. Emerson wrote of handles in his "The American Scholar" address. Peter Behrens, Walter Gropius and Antoni Gaudi all produced handle designs, many of which continue to be manufactured.

While aesthetic design, cost of manufacture and functionality remain primary drivers of door handle design, the 21st century has seen additional considerations introduced. In particular, considerations of infection control {see section below} and accessibility have become increasingly important since around 2000. The Coronavirus pandemic has contributed to a rapid development of new handle designs including foot-operated handles and handles that can be operated by the user's forearm.

== Escutcheon plate ==
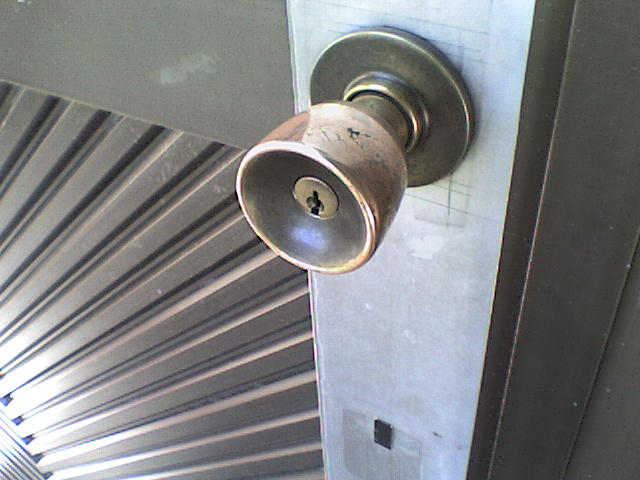
A Schlage Tulip doorknob with an escutcheon plate tight against the door

Escutcheon plates, also known as back plates, are used behind door handles, drawer pulls, surrounding keyholes and separate locks, and other similar purposes. These may be plain or fancy, embellished in any form, and serve variously to protect surrounding surfaces, conceal (and render tamperproof) important attachment fasteners, cover uneven rough openings, and add a decorative flourish.

The plate on the edge of a door (where a bolt or door plunger protrudes) is called the "faceplate"; opposite on the jamb is the "latchplate", creating or reinforcing the hole receiving a latch, bolt, or plunger.

== Usage ==
The location of the door handle along the horizontal axis on the door can vary between a few inches or centimeters away from the edge of the door to the exact center of the door, depending on local culture, decorative style, or owner preference. The distance from the edge of the door to the center of the handle is called the backset.

The location of the door handle along the vertical axis on the door may vary between 34 and 48 inches (860 and 1,220 mm).

Doorknobs can be difficult for the young and elderly to operate. For this reason, door handles in most American commercial and industrial buildings and in many households are lever-operated, rather than a knob, as the lever does not require a tight grip. Levers are also beneficial on doors with narrow stile widths where the reduced backset leaves insufficient space to comfortably turn a doorknob.

Most household door handles use a simple mechanism with a screw-style axle (called a spindle) that has at least one flat side, which is passed through the door jigger, leaving some length exposed on each side of the door to which the handles are attached. Some handles are attached on both sides by screwing or sliding them directly onto the spindle, and then securing one or more retaining screws (set screws) through the knob perpendicular to the flat of the spindle. Handles that lose traction can frequently be repaired by replacing or adjusting the set screw, which prevents them from slipping on the spindle. Other types of handles, typically used in Europe, slide onto the spindle but are affixed only to the door itself without use of set screws.

Types of household handles:

- Entrance: These door handles are typically used on exterior doors, and include keyed cylinders.
- Privacy: Typically used on bedrooms and bathrooms; while they are lockable (unlockable with a generic tool), they do not have keyed cylinders.
- Passage: Also known as hall or closet, these do not lock and are used in hall or closet doors.
- Dummy: These types are used for ball catch doors or other applications where a mechanism is not needed, but a similar aesthetic effect is desired.

=== Cars ===
Car door handles may protrude from the vehicle's exterior surface or be streamlined into the vehicle's contour (as in a Tesla, for example). In some automobiles, especially luxury vehicles, the door handles may feature a key-less entry pad utilizing either a numerical code, thumb scan or face recognition.

== Foldables ==
On a balcony whose door has an outside shutter, a special door handle is used on the outer side. The protruding part of such handle (usually ring-shaped) can be folded sideways, so that the shutter can be fully closed without being obstructed by the door handle. These doors are referenced in pop culture such as Interstellar and A Dolphin Tale, as they are culturally significant in certain regions of the world.

== Pocket doors ==
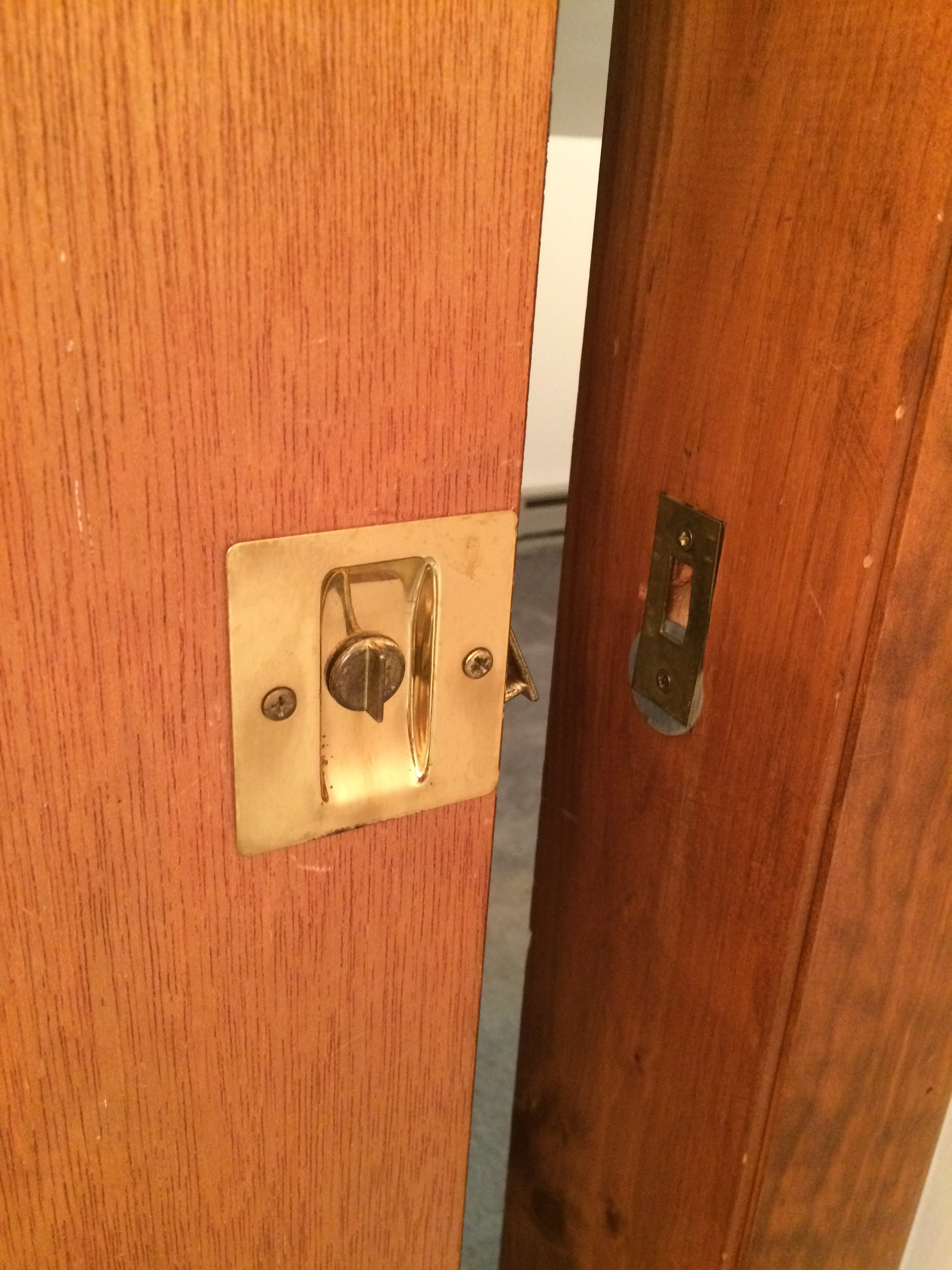
Recessed pocket door handle

A pocket door handle is a recessed rectangular insert, typically with operating hardware called a door pull.

Door handles can also be called "handle sets". In addition there are door handles that are flush-mount and require pressing rather than turning or gripping, and there are touch-free, electronic, and motion-sensor door handles.

== Infection control ==
Door handles play a role in the spread of some infections. Infection transmission can occur when an individual touches a handle and subsequently touches their eyes, nose or mouth. However, some materials, e.g. brass, copper and silver, are slowly poisonous to many germs. The exact mechanism is not known, but is commonly thought to be via the oligodynamic effect, perhaps by some other electrostatic effect. Brass and copper, for example, disinfect themselves of many door handle bacteria within eight hours. Other materials such as glass, porcelain, stainless steel and aluminium do not have this effect.

Arm-operated handles in a supermarket

To avoid hand contact, some door handles are designed to be operated by the arm or foot.

== Collecting ==
The Antique Doorknob Collectors of America (ADCA) is a nonprofit organization dedicated to the collection of antique doorknobs. Established in 1981, they have over 1000 members as of 2018. The doorknob collecting hobby was kick-started after the publication of The Antique Doorknob by Maud Eastwood in 1976.

== Gallery ==
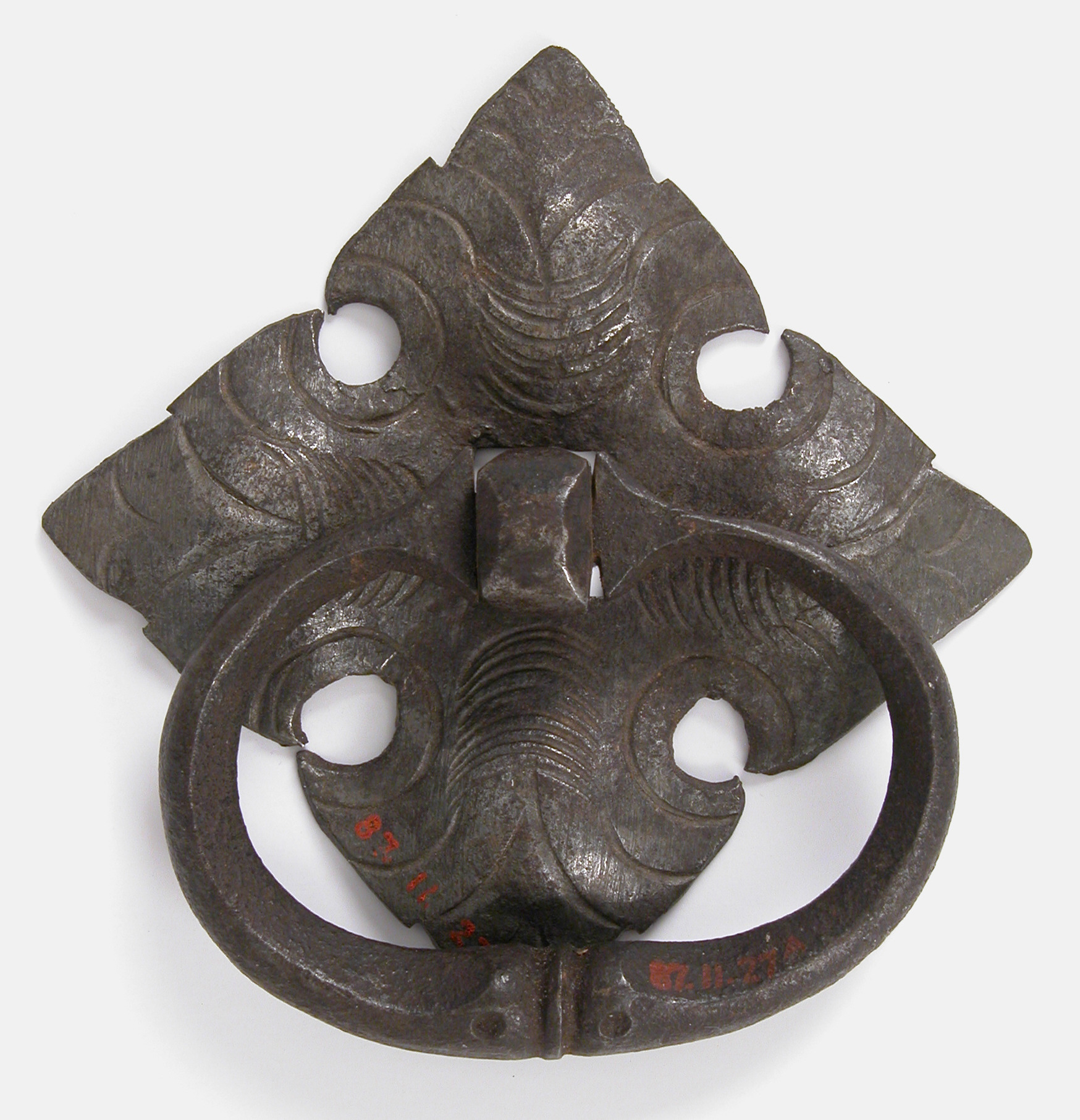
Wrought iron handle, Germany, 15th century, Metropolitan Museum

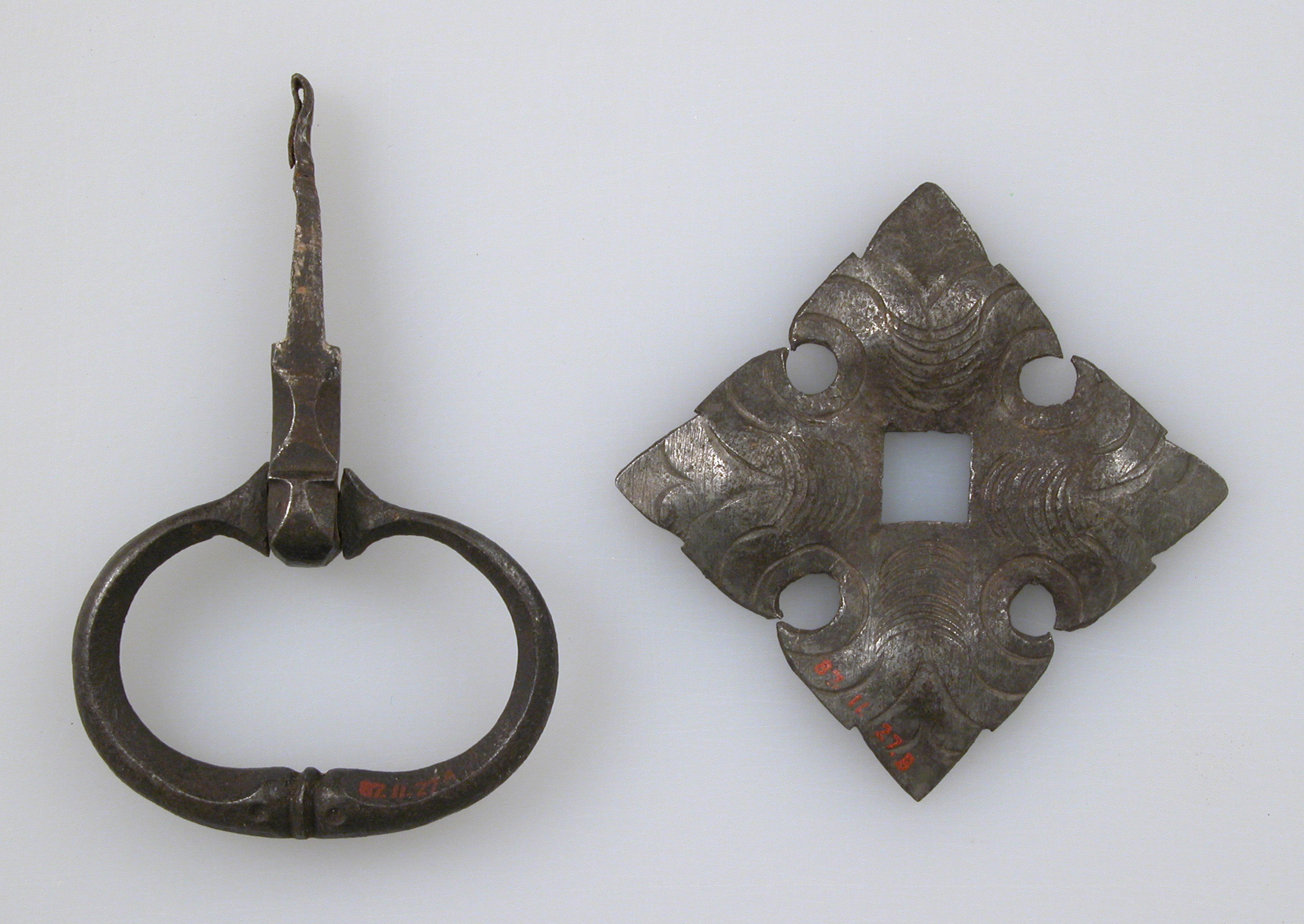
Wrought iron handle (disassembled), Germany, 15th century

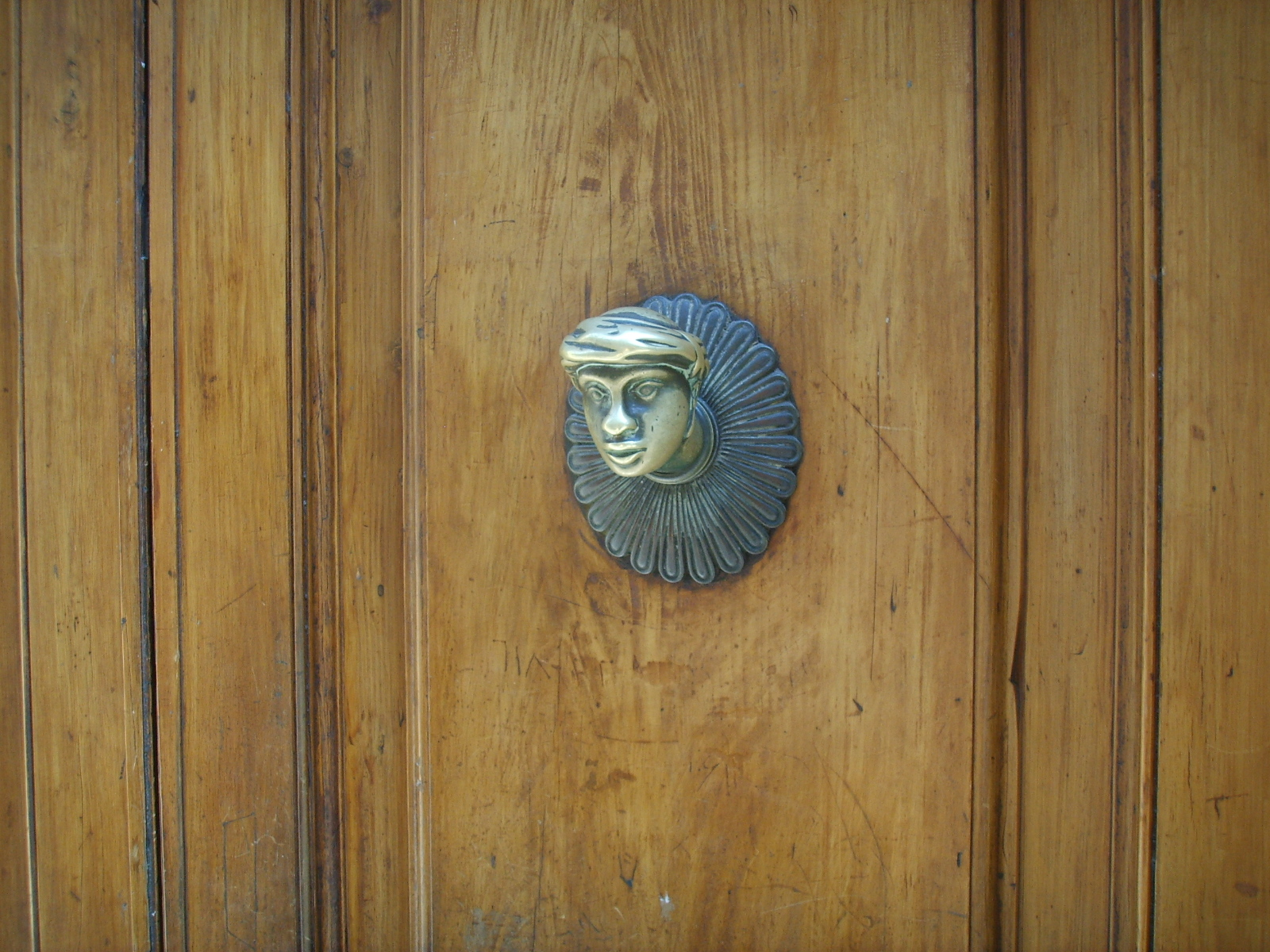
Head shaped doorknob, Florence

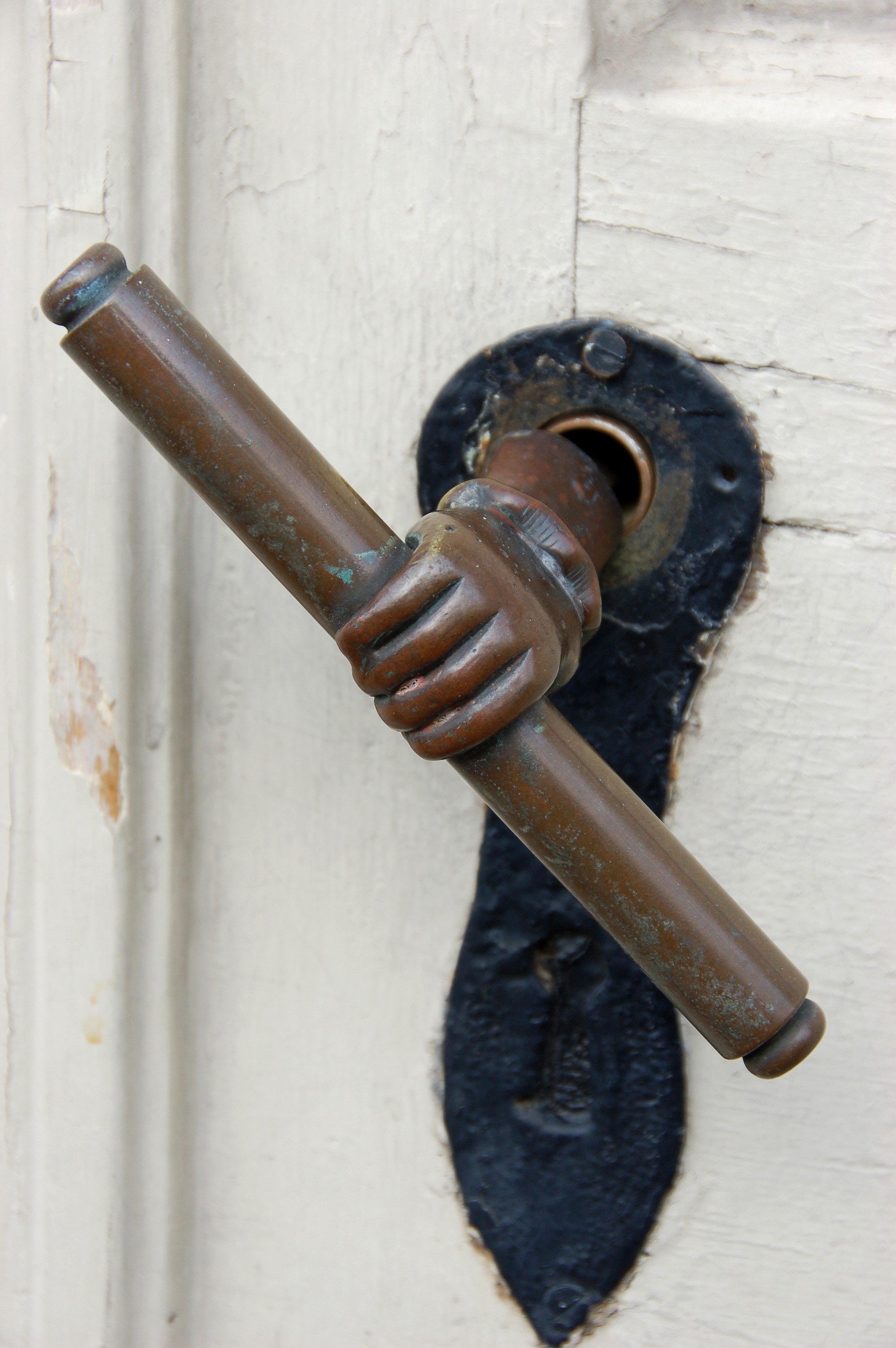
Ornate door handle on a Moravian Church

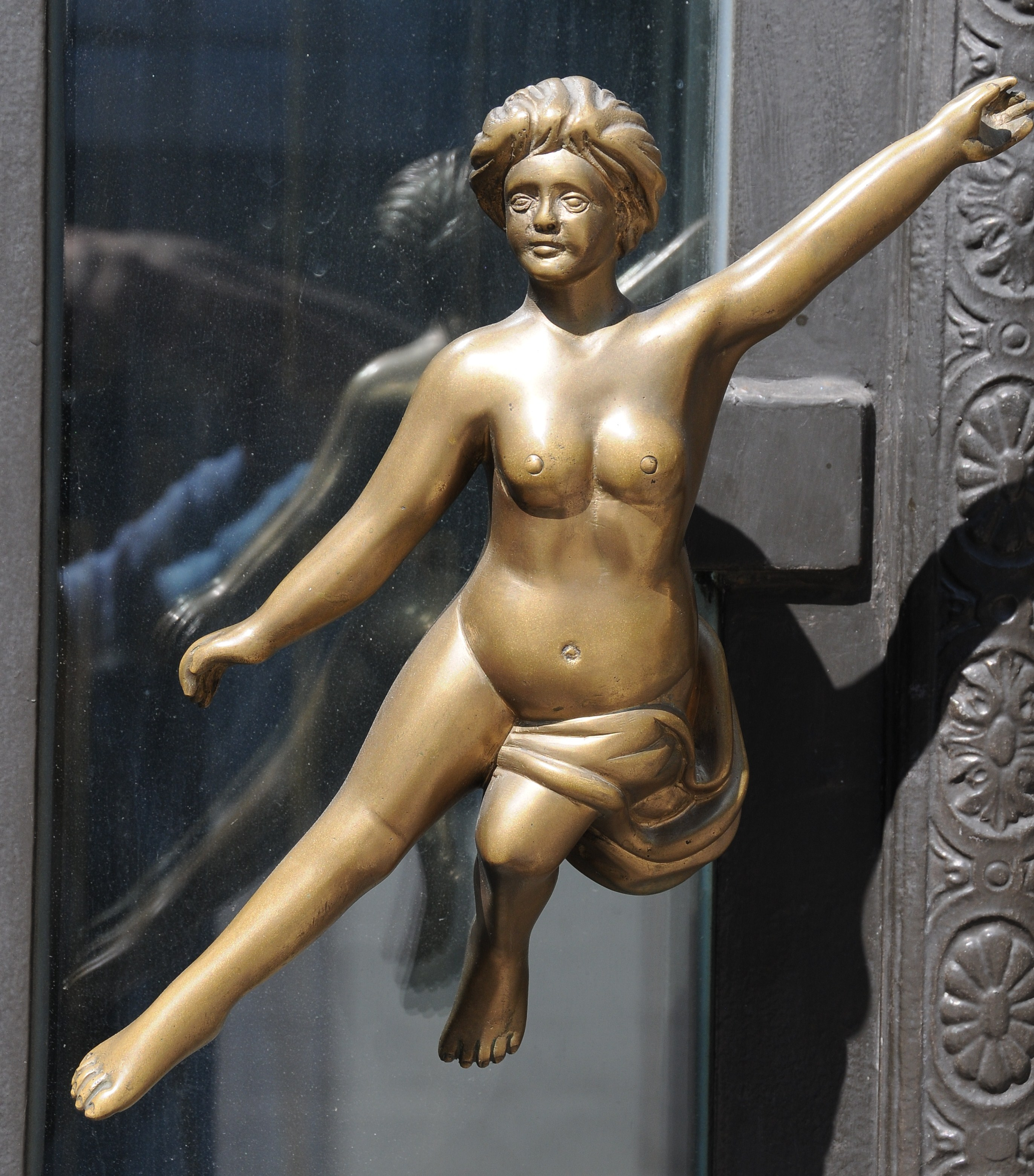
A door handle in Theatro Circo, Braga, Portugal

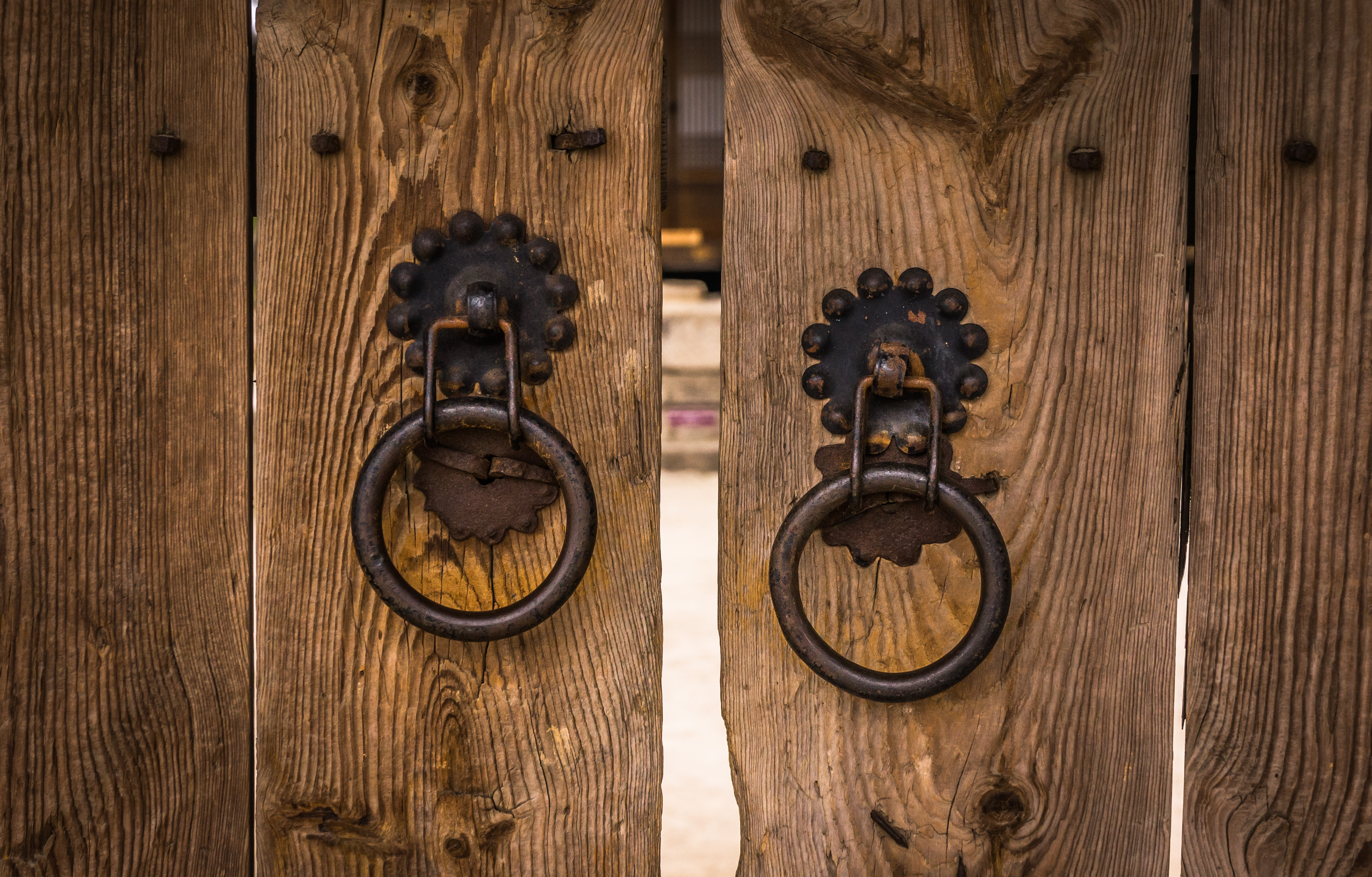
Traditional door handles in Korea

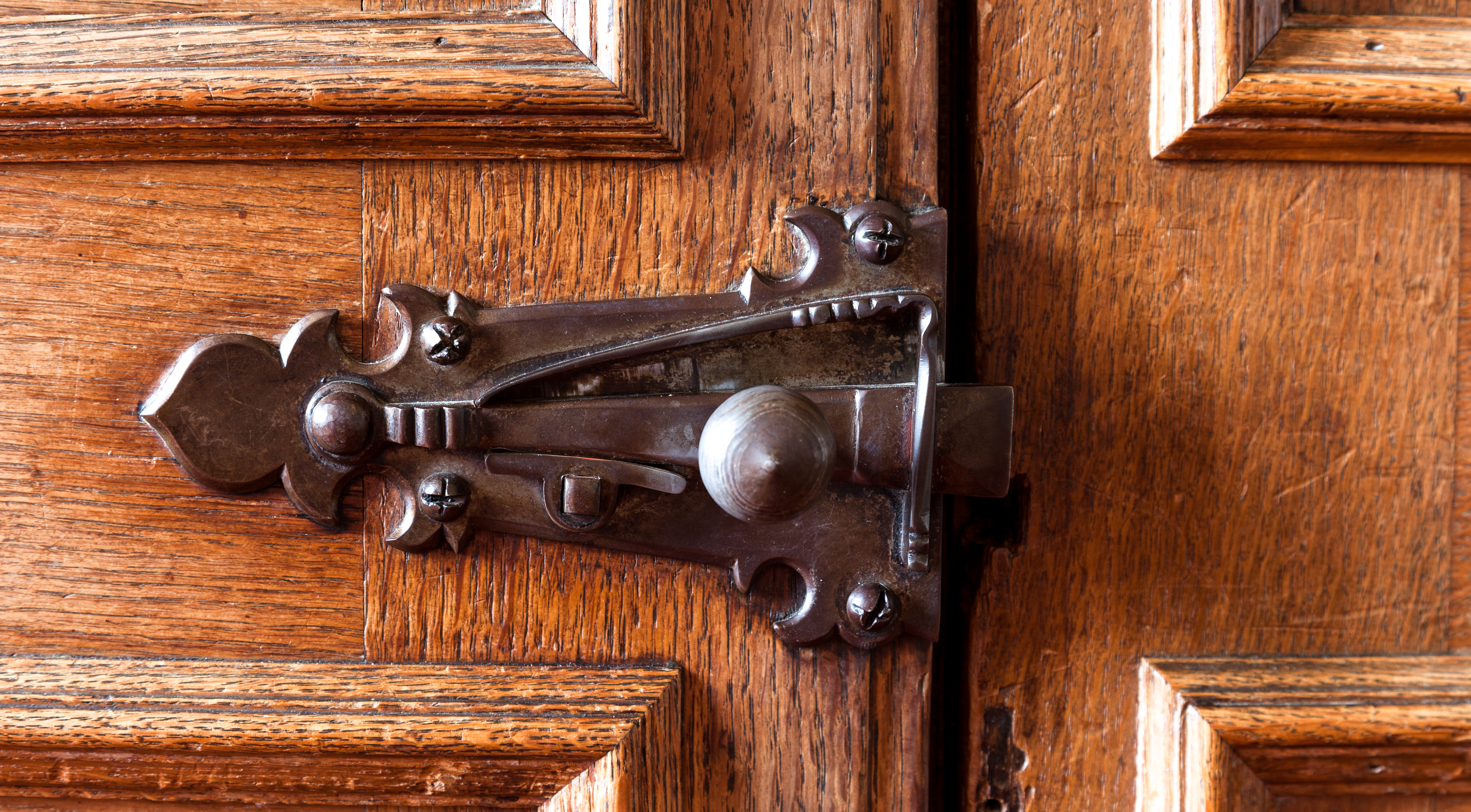
Door latch at Madingley Hall, Cambridgeshire

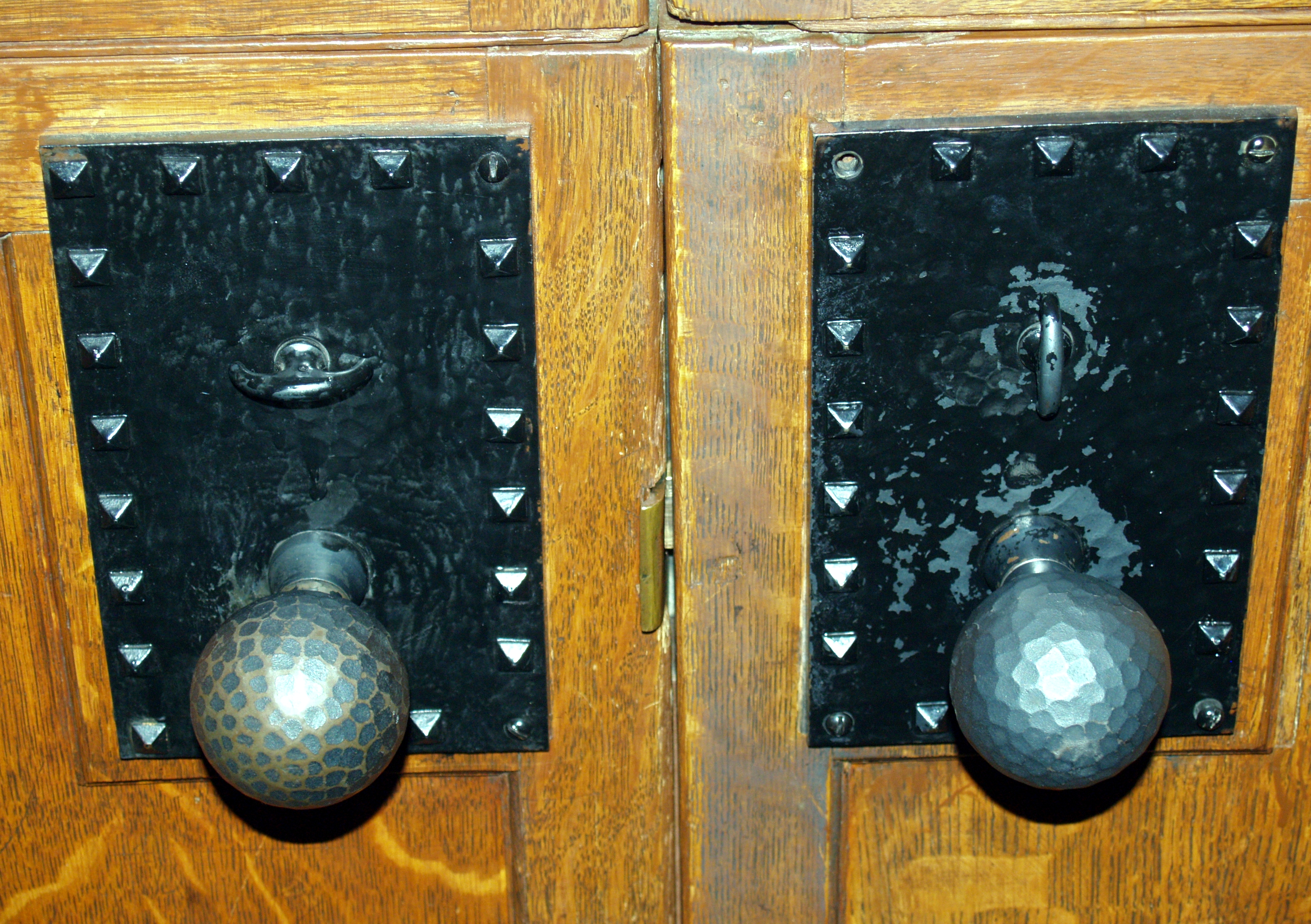
The doorknobs at Glen Eyrie castle in Colorado Springs

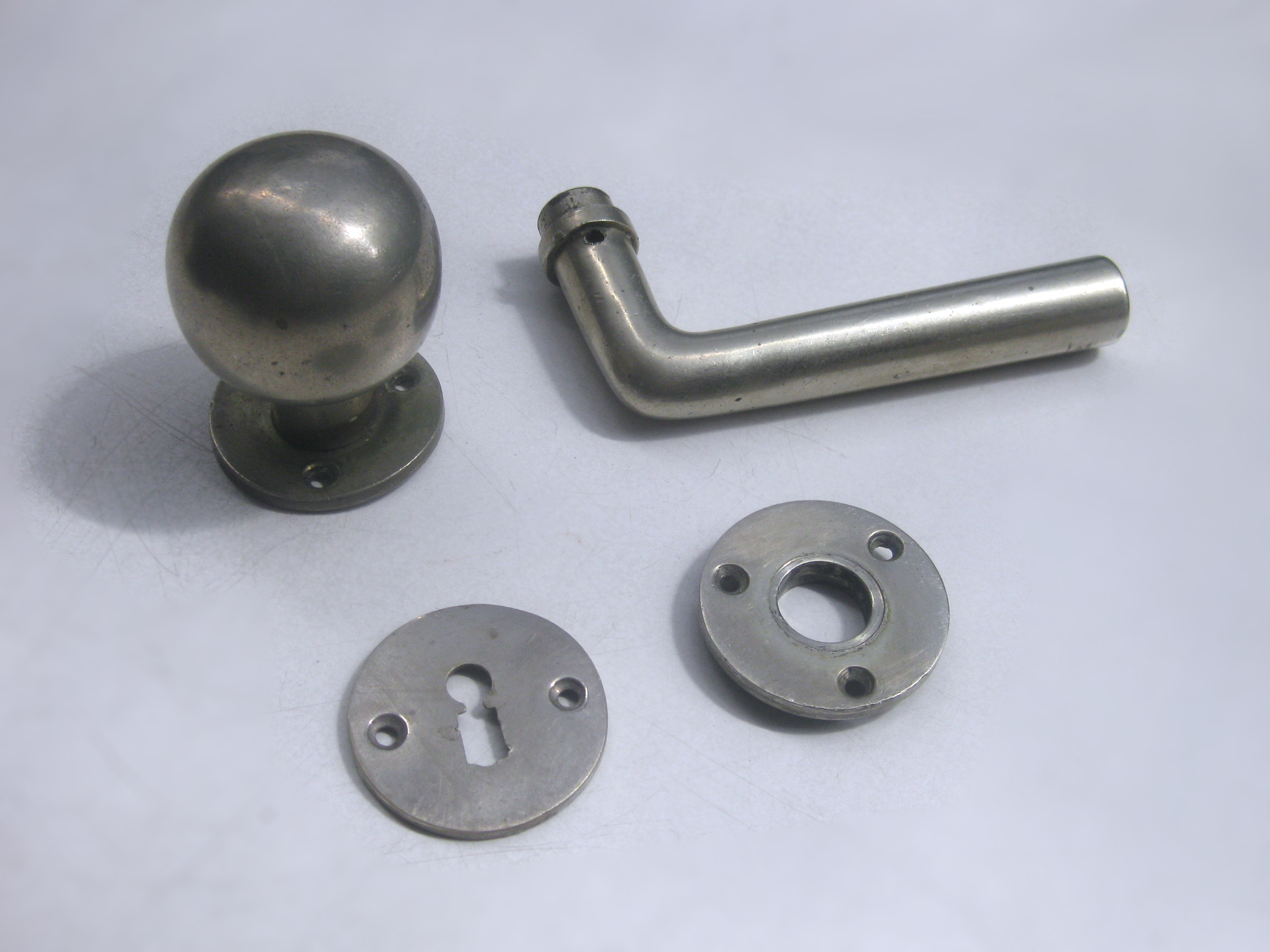
Door handles designed by Ferdinand Kramer, 1925

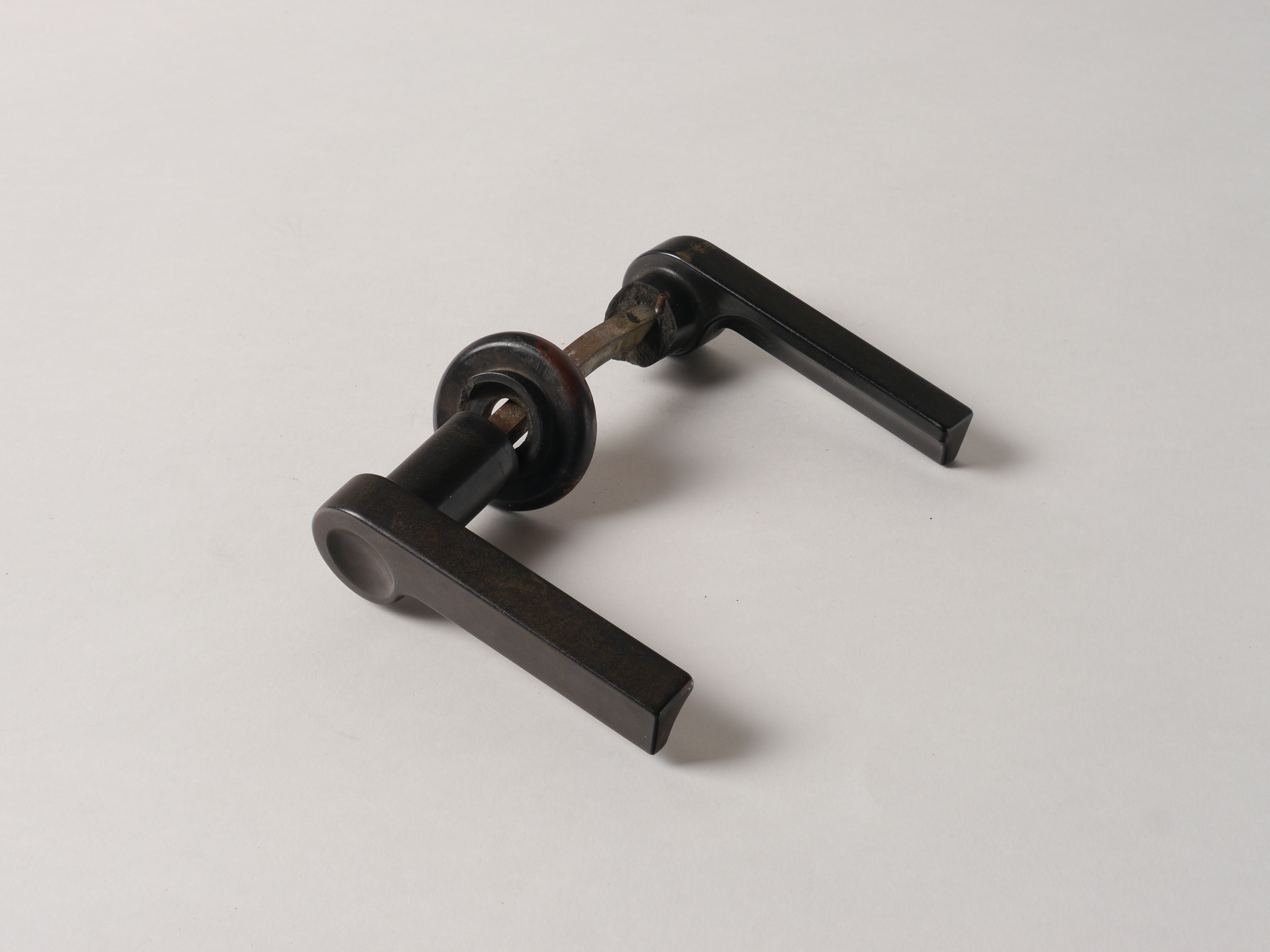
Double door handle in bakelite, collection Museum of Industry, Ghent

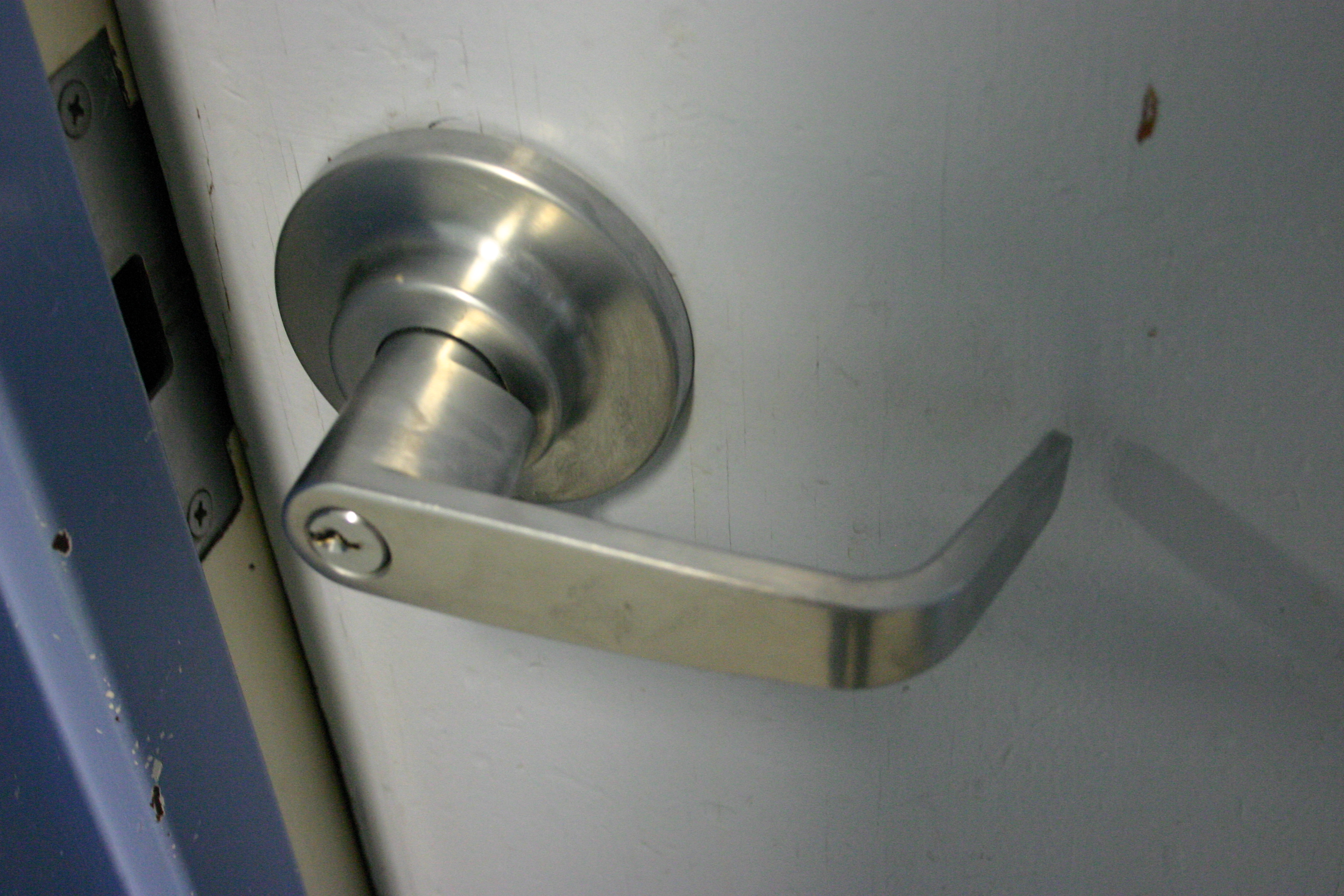
Commercial duty lever door handle

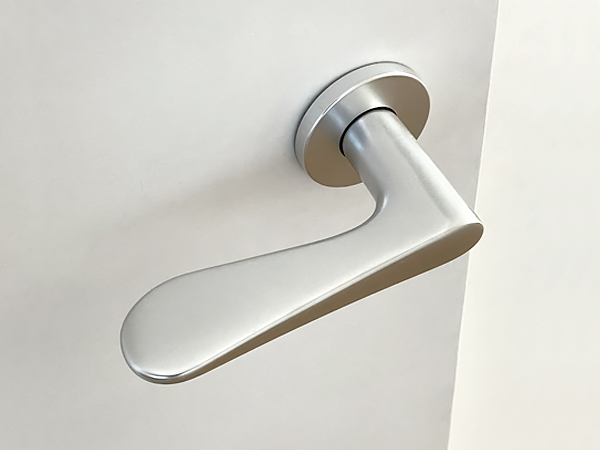
Lever-style door handle by Jasper Morrison, 1990

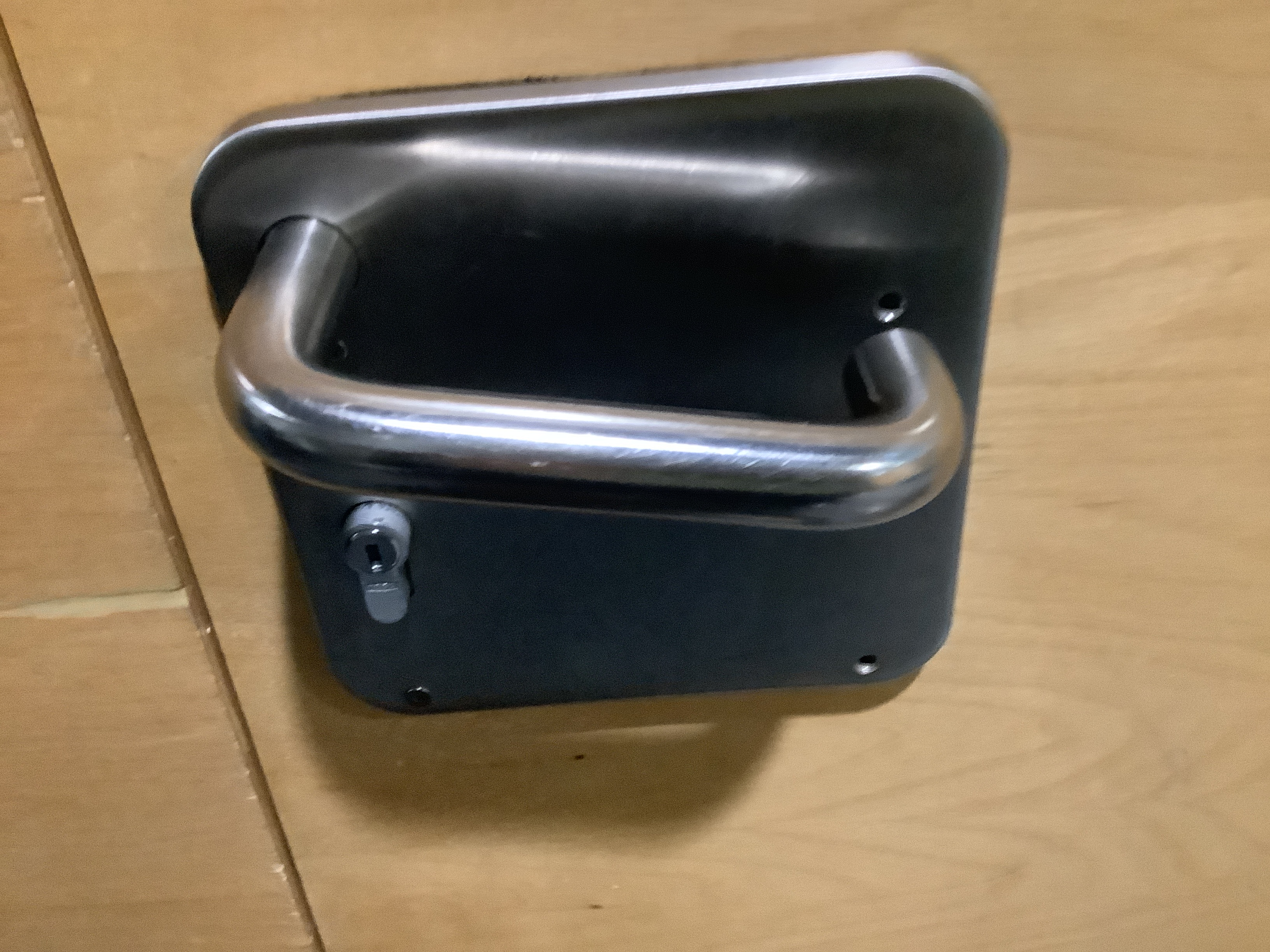
Door handle

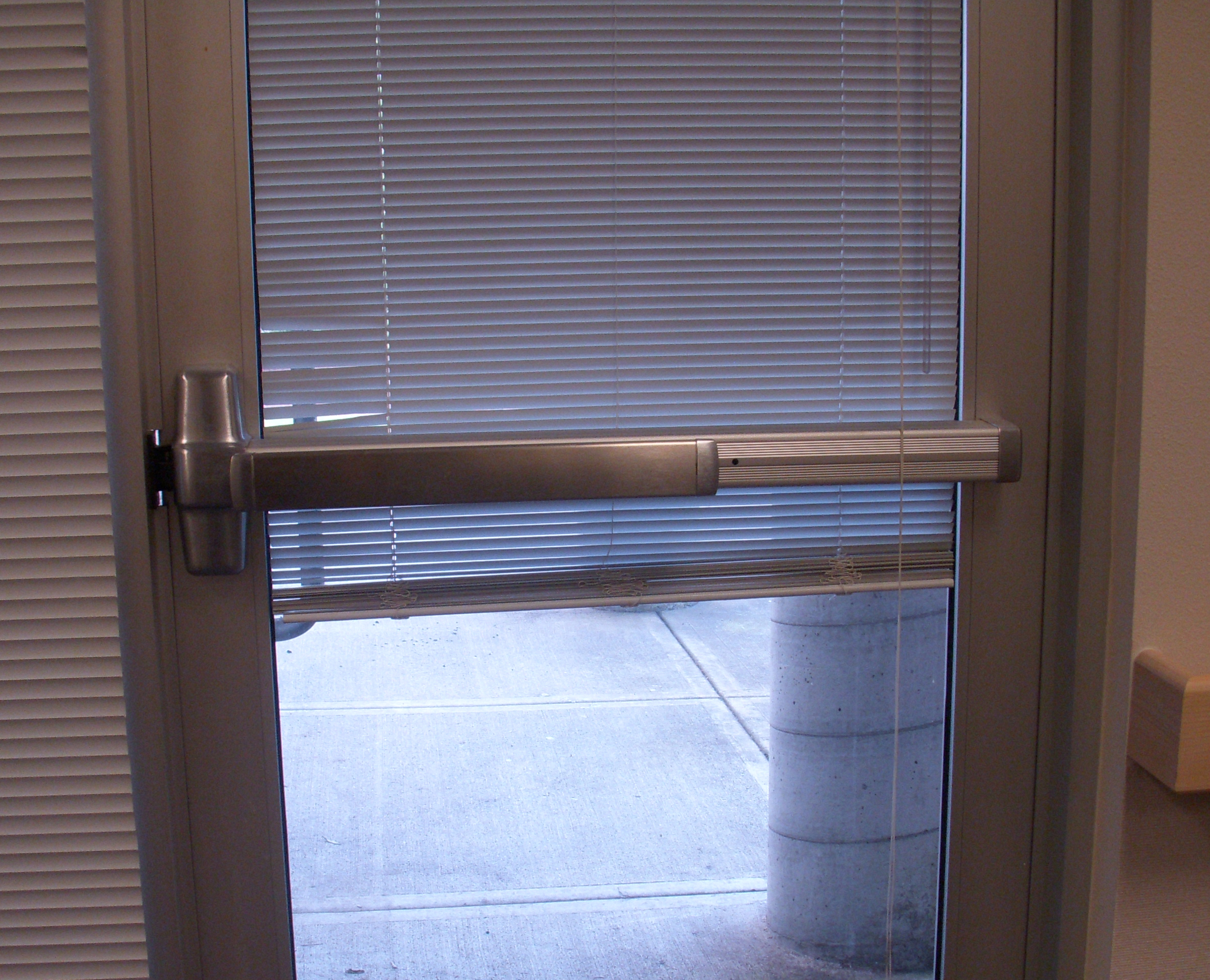
"Crash bar" handle installed on a glass exterior door

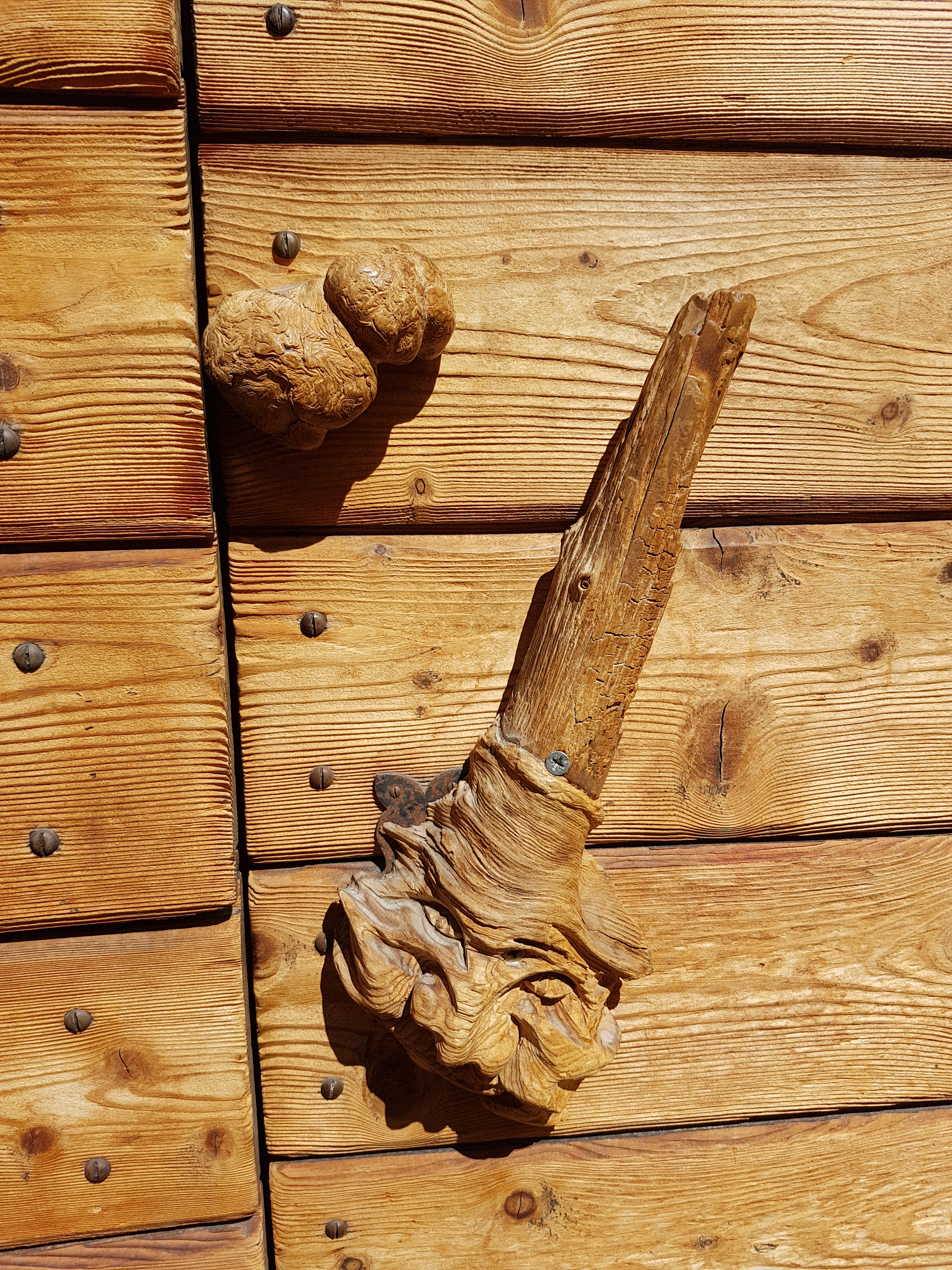
Switzerland-Grisons-Door-Door handles-latch-01E

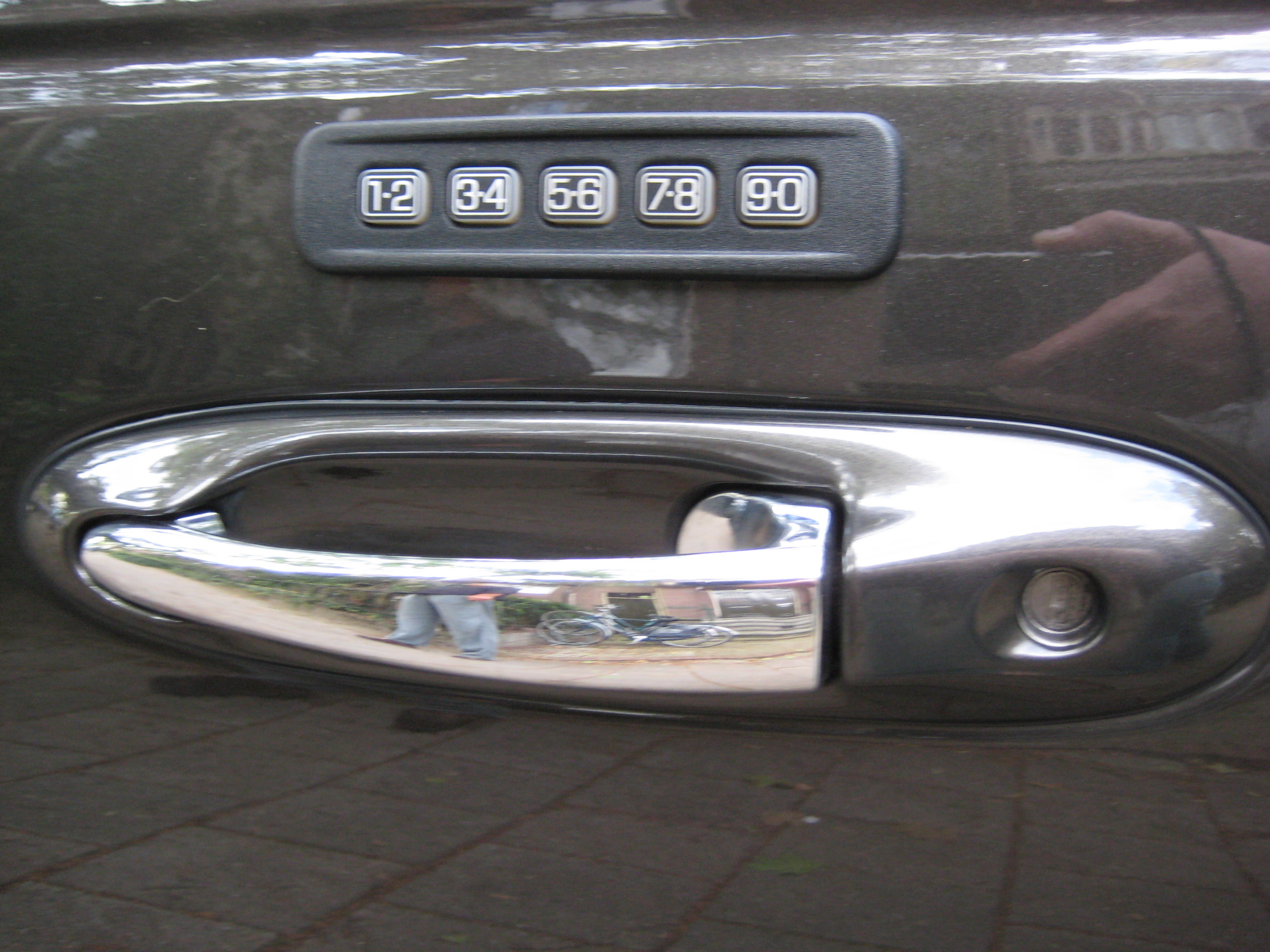
Exterior door handle of a 1998 Lincoln Town Car, featuring digital lock

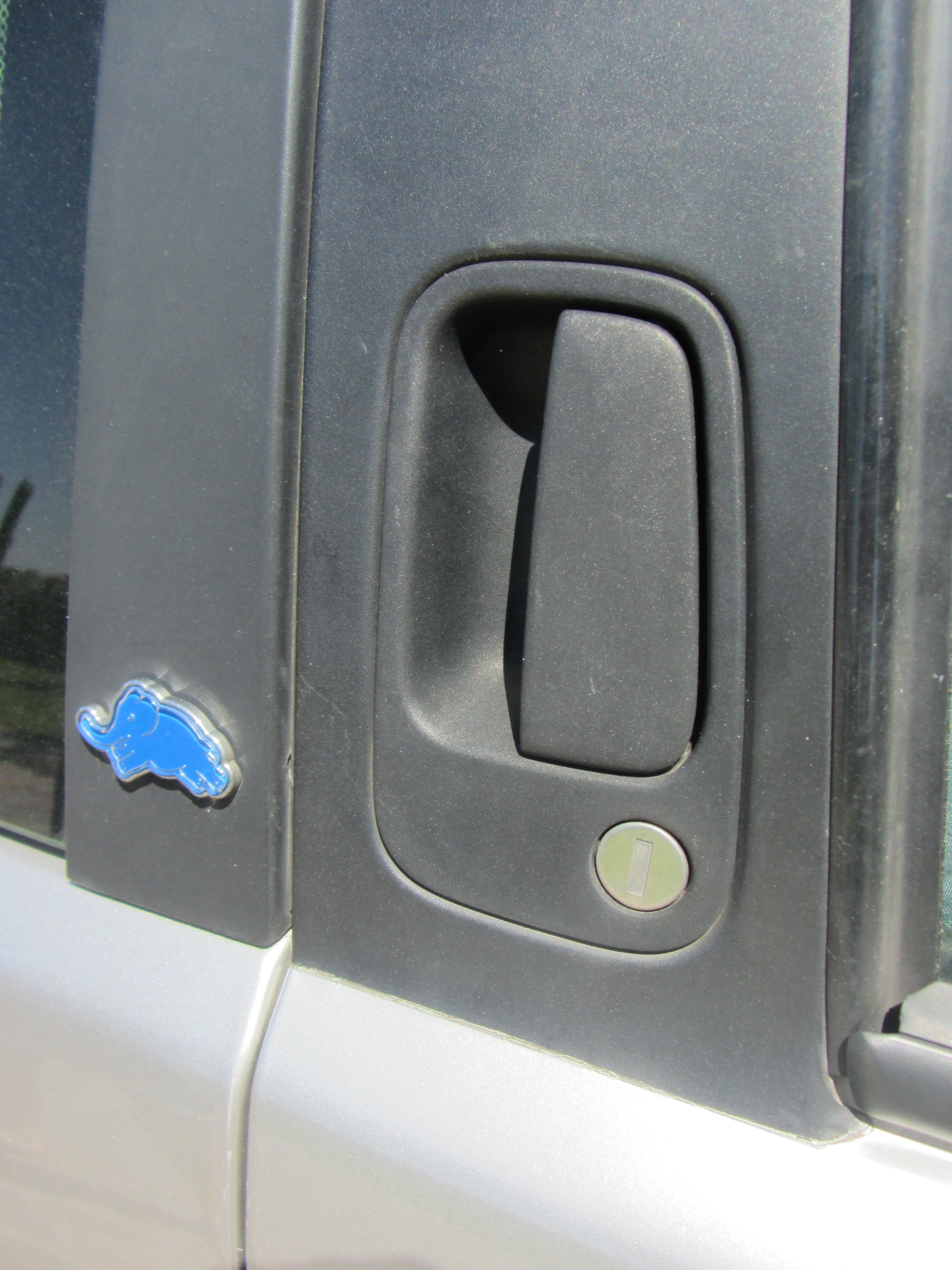
Exterior door handle of a 1996 Lancia Y, recessed into the B pillar

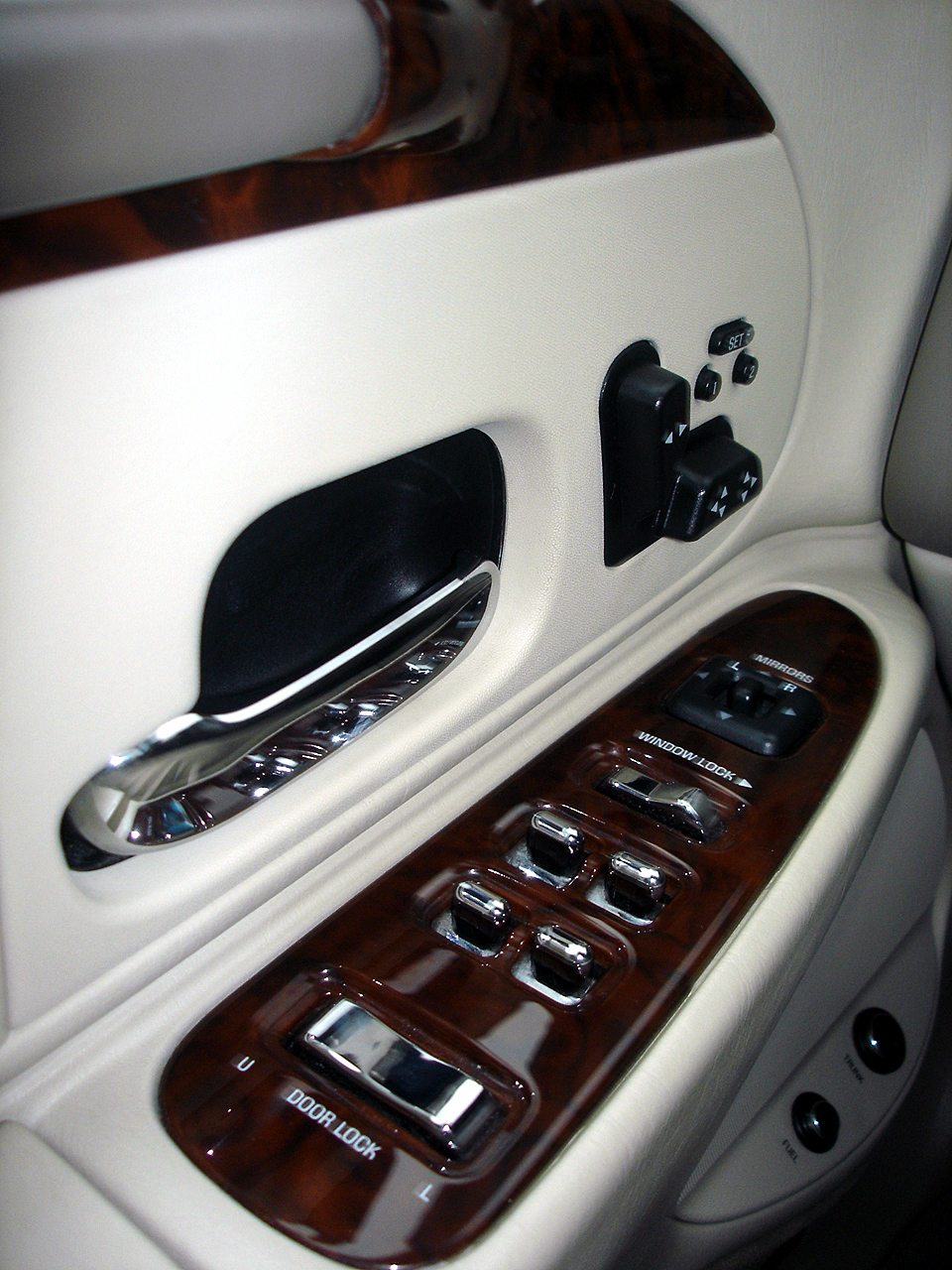
Chromed interior door panel of a 1998 Lincoln Town Car

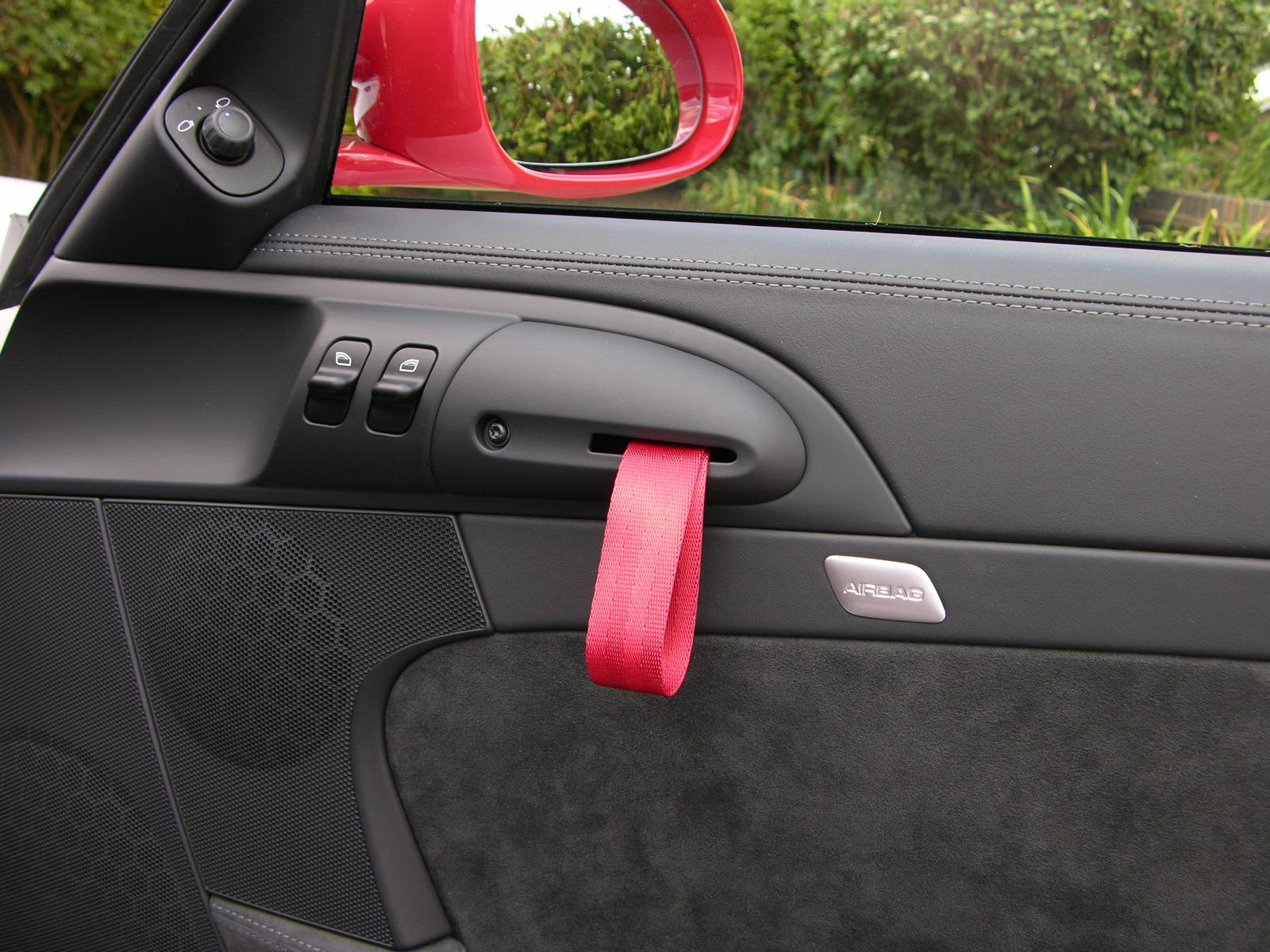
Lightweight strap door pull of a 2010 Porsche 911 GT3

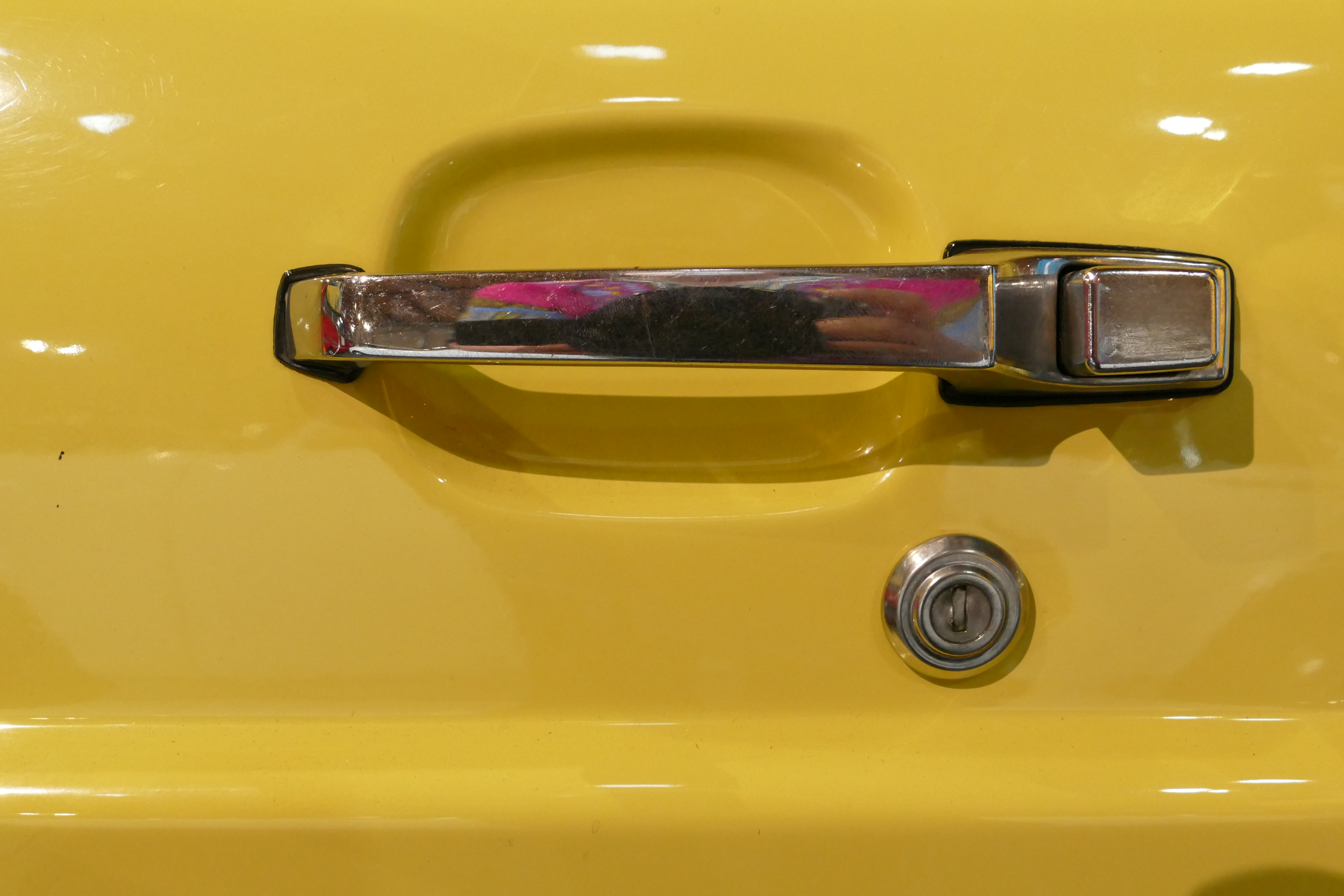
Door handle of a 1974 Mazda Rotary Pickup

== See also ==
- Doorbell
- Door furniture
- Door knocker
- Drawer pull
