= The Spindles =

The Spindles may refer to:

- The Spindles Town Square Shopping Centre, a retail complex in Oldham, England
- The Spindles, burial towers at Amrit, Syria

== See also ==
- Spindle (disambiguation)
