= Spindling =

Allocation of different files to different hard disks

In computers spindling is the allocation of different files (e.g., the data files and index files of a database) on different hard disks. This practice usually reduces contention for read or write resources, thus increasing the system's performance.

The word comes from spindle, the axis on which the hard disks spin.
