= Johanne Spindler =

Danish ballet dancer and stage actress

Johanne Spindler (1781 – 1861), was a Danish ballet dancer and stage actress. She was regarded as one of the elite members of the Royal Danish Ballet in 1790–1806, and as an actress of the Royal Danish Theatre in 1799–1829. She attracted attention also for her private life - in 1806, she divorced her first husband and was forced to pay him allowance, which was almost unique for a woman in contemporary Denmark. After her second marriage to a rich man in 1811, she continued to work (which was also unusual for an actress married to a non-artist in that epoch) and also attracted attention by being able to play the role of upper class woman onstage wearing actual jewels.
