= John Joseph Bramah =

English ironmaster and engineer

John Joseph Bramah (1798–1846), nephew of inventor and locksmith Joseph Bramah, was an English ironmaster and engineer.

== Career ==
On 1 July 1832, the partnership between J. J. Bramah and his cousins Francis Bramah and Edward Bramah, described as "Engineers, Millwrights, Ironfounders, Smiths, and Plumbers", was dissolved as J. J. Bramah left to run his own business.

Bramah, together with George Stephenson and Robert Stephenson, created a substantial railway equipment business at Pimlico, London, starting from his uncle Joseph Bramah's business. The 1815 Beauties of England and Wales described it as "the chief ornament of this neighbourhood", being the "amazingly extensive and interesting manufactory of Mr. Bramah, the engineer, locksmith, and engine-maker", and praising it in terms: "These works have been deemed worthy the inspection of royalty, and have excited the admiration of the most powerful emperor of Christendom, Alexander of Russia."

In 1836, Bramah was insured as an "iron founder", of 4 Eccleston Place, Pimlico.

In 1839, with Charles Fox (1810–1874), the company became Bramah, Fox and Co. at Smethwick, near Birmingham. It was known as the London Works.

In 1840, Messrs John Joseph Bramah and others, "engineers", had "the contract for supplying the iron work of the Black wall Railway".

1844 Bramah, Ironmaster of Dudley, was a member of the committee of management of the Oxford, Worcester and Wolverhampton Railway.

1844 Bramah purchased share in the Broomfield ironworks, at which point the name of the partnership became Bramah, Barrows, and Hall.

1845 Bramah of Ashwood House purchased Horseley Ironworks and intended to put them into full operation, according to the Wolverhampton Chronicle.

1846 13 September: Death of Bramah, an extensive ironmaster and celebrated engineer, at Ashwood House, Kingswinford in his 48th year. Messrs Barrows and Hall purchased his share in the partnership Bramah, Barrows, and Hall from his estate.

== Family ==
Bramah was the nephew of Joseph Bramah of Ashdown House, Kingswinford.

He was married to Martha Barracliff (1801–1870). They lived in Staffordshire. When Bramah's sister Esther Frances Bramah died, the couple acted as wards for the orphaned children Thomas Bramah Diplock and Samuel Robey Diplock. Thomas Bramah Diplock is chiefly famous for having been the coroner for some of the "Jack the Ripper" murders. Diplock was father of Bramah Joseph Diplock.

== Bibliography ==
- British History Online: Chapter IV: Pimlico
