= James C. Spindler =

American lawyer

James C. Spindler is an American lawyer, currently the Sylvan Lang Professor of Law at University of Texas at Austin, and also a published author. Previously, Spindler taught at the University of Southern California and practiced in the New York and Hong Kong offices of Cravath, Swaine & Moore in its securities and banking groups. He holds a J.D. from Harvard Law School, a Ph.D. in Economics from the University of California, Los Angeles, and an A.B. in Political Economy from Princeton University.
