= Maud Eastwood =

Doorknob collector and author

- Born: 1920; Chitwood, Oregon
- Died: 2014 (aged 93–94)
- Occupations: Amateur historian, author
- Notable work: The Antique Doorknob (1976)

Maud Lucile Eastwood was an amateur historian and collector of antique doorknobs.

== Life ==
Maud Eastwood was born in 1920 in Chitwood, Oregon. She was a collector of doorknobs for most of her life. In 1972, she retired from her job as a beauty salon operator in Tillamook, Oregon and began to seriously collect and research the history of doorknobs.

In 1976, Eastwood published The Antique Doorknob, the first collector's manual for the hobby. The book is regarded as having kick-started the hobby. A year later saw the first publication of a newsletter: The Doorknob Collector. In 1981, the first national convention of the Antique Doorknob Collectors of America (ADCA) was held in Waverly, Iowa. Eastwood was granted a lifetime position on the organization's Board Directors in 1983 and served as its president in 1987.

Eastwood was estimated to have the largest collection of antique doorknobs in the United States in the late 1970s, totaling approximately 1500 doorknobs.

== Works ==
- The Antique Doorknob (1976)
- Antique Builders Hardware: Knobs and Accessories: Research Manual & Collector's Guide (1982)
- 150 Years of Builders' Hardware: Forms, Use & Lore (1993)
