= Spindel =

Spindel is a surname. Notable people with the surname include:

- Bernard Spindel (1923–1971), American surveillance expert
- David Spindel (born 1941), American photographer
- Hal Spindel (1913–2002), American baseball player
- Janis Spindel, American entrepreneur

== See also ==
- Spindle (disambiguation)
