= Angela Spindler =

Chief Executive Officer Angela Spindler

CEO of N Brown Group Plc
- In office July 2013 – October 2018
- Preceded by: Alan White

CEO of The Factory Shop Group Limited
- In office January 2009 – June 2013
- Preceded by: George Foster
- Succeeded by: Tony Page

Chair of Remco
- In office February 2008 – Incumbent

Managing Director of Debenhams
- In office August 2007 – January 2009
- Succeeded by: Michael Sharp

Managing Director of ASDA George Clothing
- In office November 2005 – August 2007

Personal details
- Born: Angela Spindler
- Profession: Retail Chief Executive

Angela Spindler is a British businesswoman and the former CEO of N Brown Group Plc; she assumed the role in July 2013. She is also the chair of Remco, based in Manchester.

== Career ==
=== Early years ===
Spindler attended the Victoria University of Manchester and Harvard Business School.

Spindler started her career in 1983 as a graduate trainee at Cadbury Schweppes. She then moved to Pedigree Petfoods, gathering experience in sales, marketing and human resources. In 1997, she joined Asda as a unit director and climbed her way through the ranks until November 2005, when she became managing director of George Clothing, Asda's clothing department that is stocked in Asda's and Walmart's in several countries worldwide.

=== Debenhams ===
Spindler left her role at George Clothing in August 2007, to become managing director of Debenhams, a high street clothing retailer in the UK, with franchises around the world. She left this role in January 2009, to take an opportunity that she described as “simply too good to miss", which was joining the Factory Shop Group.

=== The Factory Shop Group Limited ===
Spindler is the former CEO of The Factory Shop Group Limited

Whilst at the Factory Shop, Spindler oversaw a large expansion scheme and increased sales and profitability. In September 2012, The Telegraph reported that the chain's year-on-year sales had increased almost 6% and its pre-tax profits were up 30% in the prior six months. Spindler has always attributed the chains' success to having quality products at reduced prices and opening stores in 'under-served' areas.

Spindler referred to the company as “one of retail’s best kept secrets”, and claimed she had not heard of the company prior to accepting the job. Spindler is married and resides in Yorkshire, but will be relocating to Cheshire.
