= The Original Factory Shop =

United Kingdom discount department store

Coordinates: 53.7788°N 2.2799°W

The Factory Shop Limited

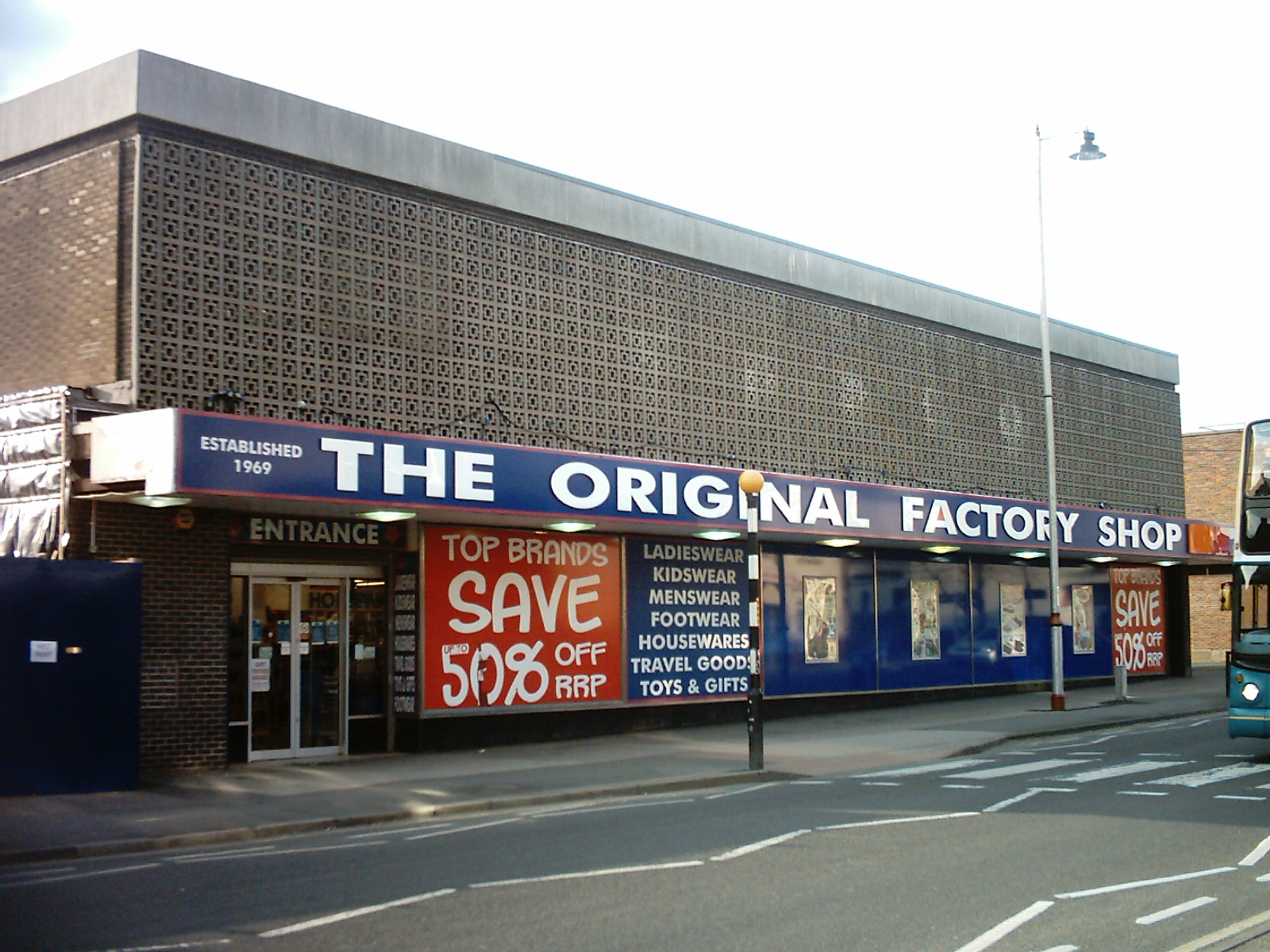
- The Original Factory Shop in Garforth before its closure
- Trade name: The Original Factory Shop
- Type: Private
- Industry: Retail
- Genre: Department Store
- Founded: 1969; 57 years ago
- Founder: Peter Blacks
- Defunct: 4 April 2026
- Fate: Administration
- Headquarters: Burnley, England, UK
- Number of locations: 137
- Area served: United Kingdom
- Key people: Ian Williams, CEO (2024)
- Products: Various
- Revenue: £193 million
- Owner: Modella Capital
- Parent: The Factory Shop Group Limited

The Factory Shop Limited, trading as The Original Factory Shop, was a discount department store chain that operated from 1969 to 2026.

On 28 January 2026, the company went into administration. On 4 April 2026, the final shops closed.

== History ==
The Original Factory Shop was established in 1969 as part of Peter Black's retail network. Initially it sold soap manufactured by one of Black's factories. The chain now has 185 outlets.

During 2010 to 2011, the chain expanded its warehouse and offices in Burnley by 100,000 square feet (9,300 m^{2}) to provide for the future needs of the business.

In August 2011, the chain did not perform as well with profits reduced, due to economic conditions and large investment, including many store openings, expansion of headquarters and warehouse and upgrading store equipment. The chief executive is former Lloyds Pharmacy boss Tony Page, who replaced Angela Spindler in June 2013. In May 2010, rumours surfaced that the parent company Duke Street Capital had put the chain up for sale for £200 million. These rumours were later denied by The Original Factory Shop and Duke Street Capital.

On 26 June 2018, it was announced that The Original Factory Shop was to close 32 stores due to falling profits, and the withdrawal of its credit insurance.

The group's profits soared, post the COVID-19 pandemic, in the financial year 2021/22. Total revenue was £124.4 million, a growth of 250%. Profit being £8.5 million, up £2.4 million on the previous year.

In 2024, Ian Williams was appointed as CEO. In February 2025, Modella Capital bought the chain from Duke Street Capital.

On 5 January 2026, the company entered administration. The online store closed on 28 January. It was confirmed The Original Factory Shop would be closing all together, via the former online website.

== Operations ==
The chain sold fashion, homewares, toys, and personal care products. The products ranged from the chain's own lines, branded products, or cut label products from a high street chain or supermarket.

In the middle of 2010, The Original Factory Shop opened its online store.
