= Bail handle =

Open-loop handle for carrying or hanging items, or as a drawer pull

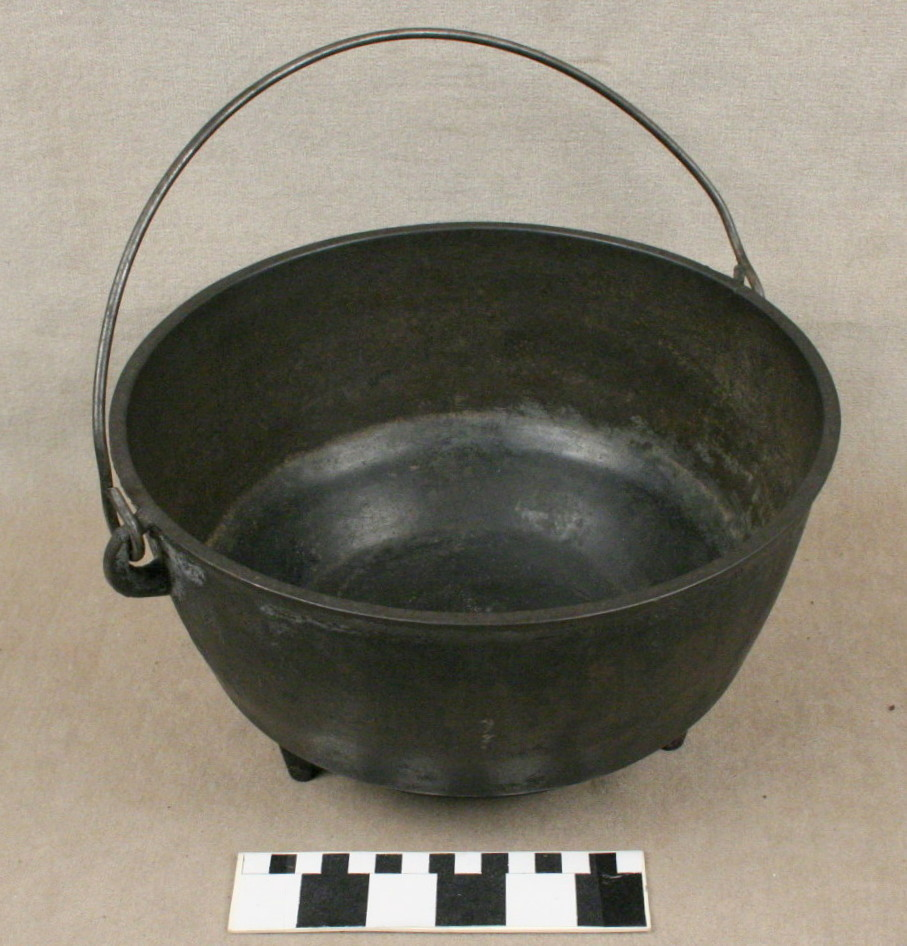
A cast iron cooking pot with bail handle

A bail handle, or simply bail, is a handle that consists of an open loop that moves freely within two fixed mounts or ears. It is a type of metal or plastic package handle used for carrying such items such tin cans, buckets, or kettles, or as a form of drawer pull. A bail handle can also be used to hang items such as IV bottles and potted plants.

A flip-top closure on a bottle or jar is sometimes called a bail closure.

Decorative bail handles appeared on pieces of French Rococo furniture during the early 18th century. These handles on drawers were rounded and hinged onto an escutcheon plate and hung down in the shape of a half moon or arch. Due to being hinged, they were able to move up and down and they were usually elaborately decorated.

== Examples ==
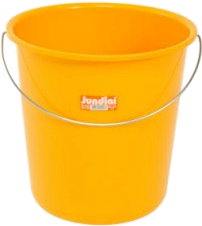
Plastic yellow pail or bucket

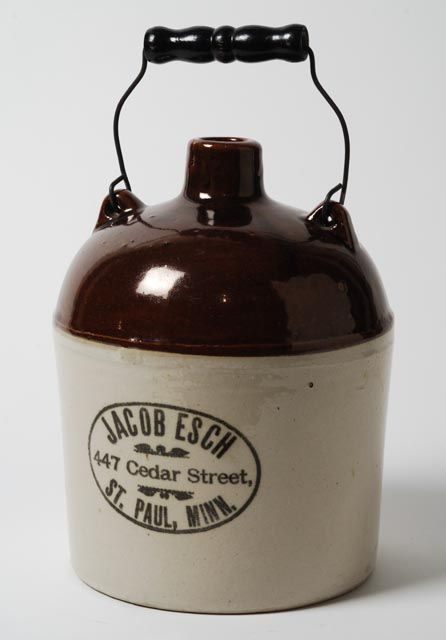
American stoneware jug

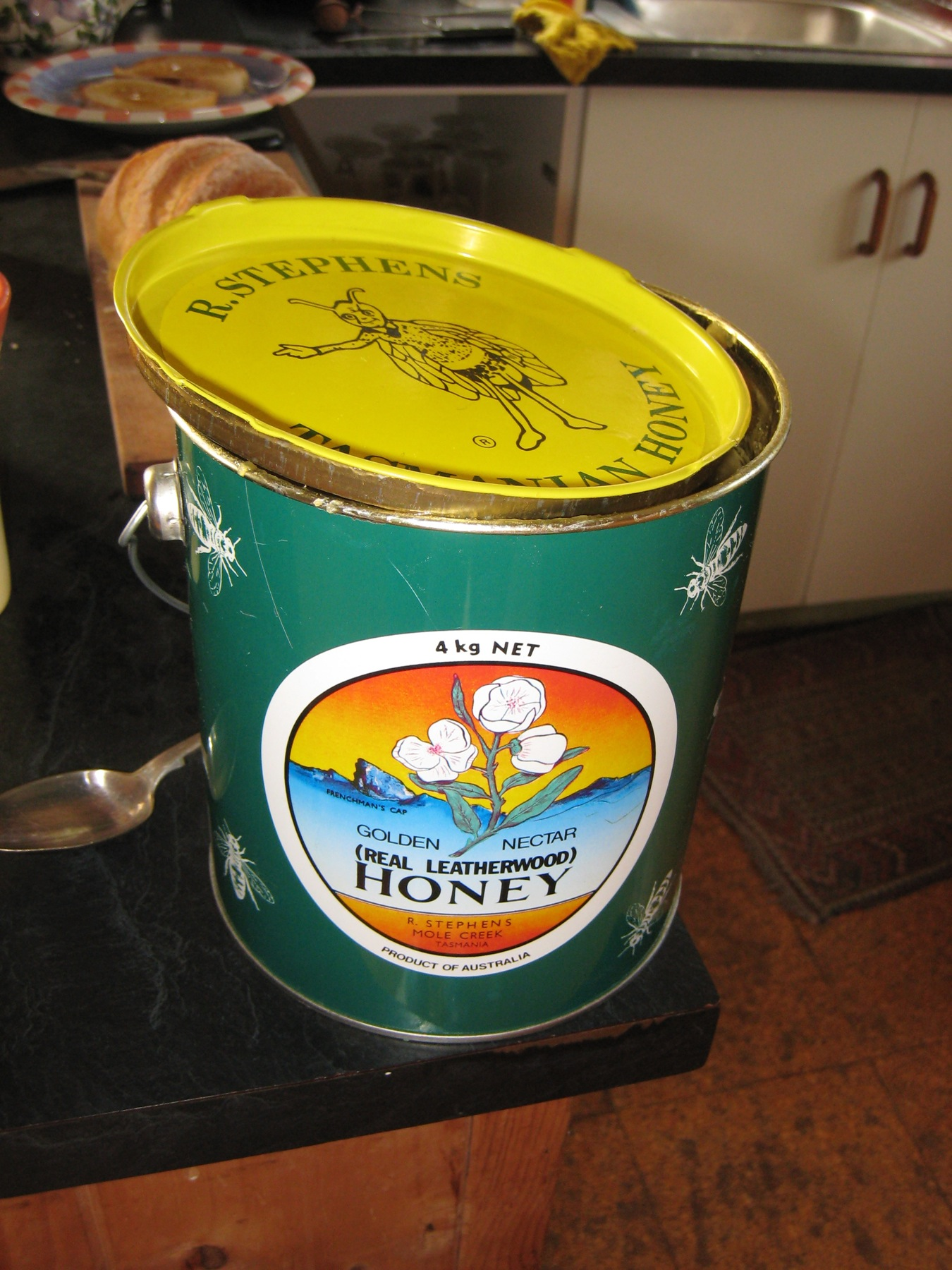
Paint can with bail handle

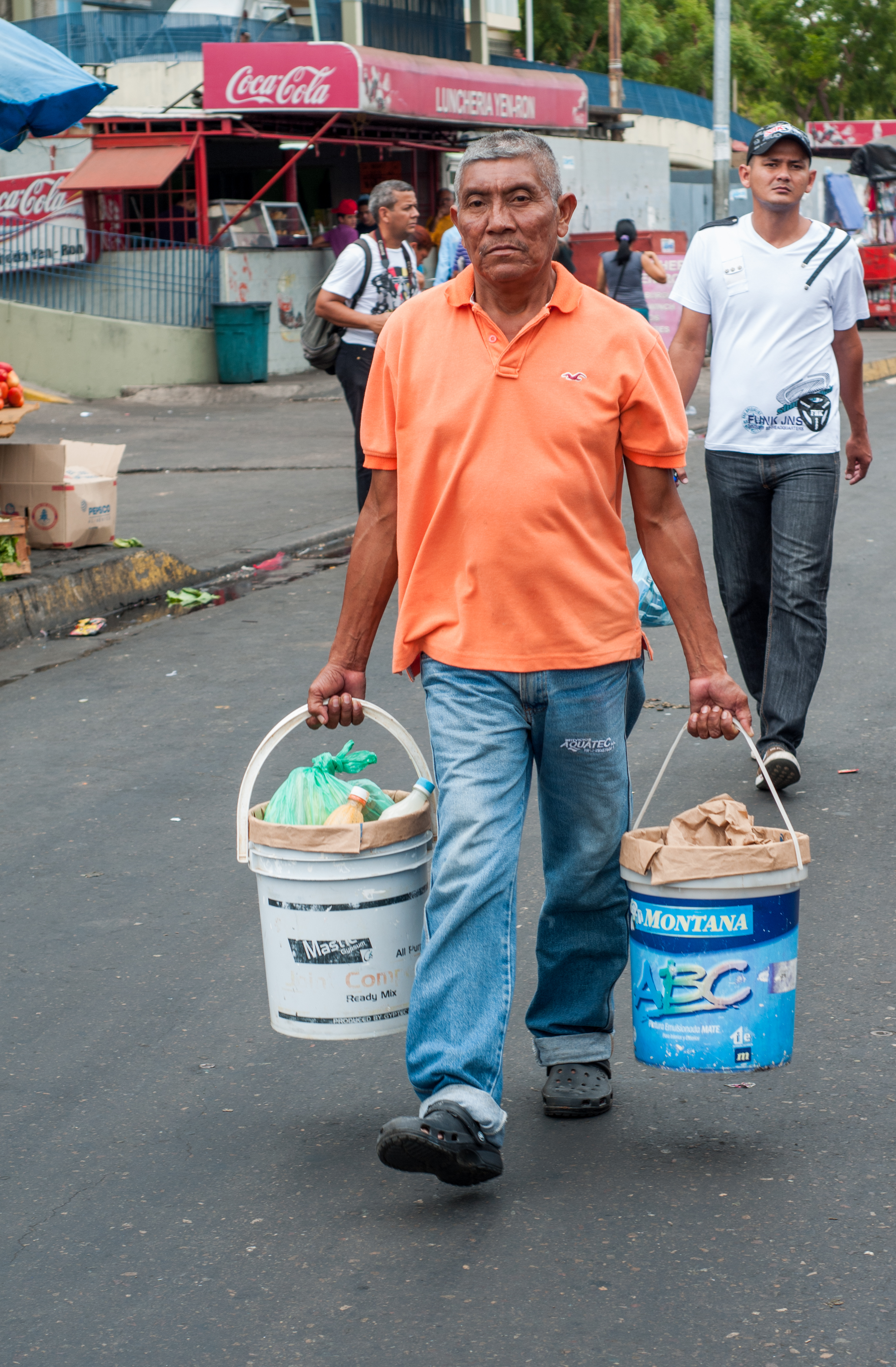
Similar plastic pails with different styles of plastic bail handles

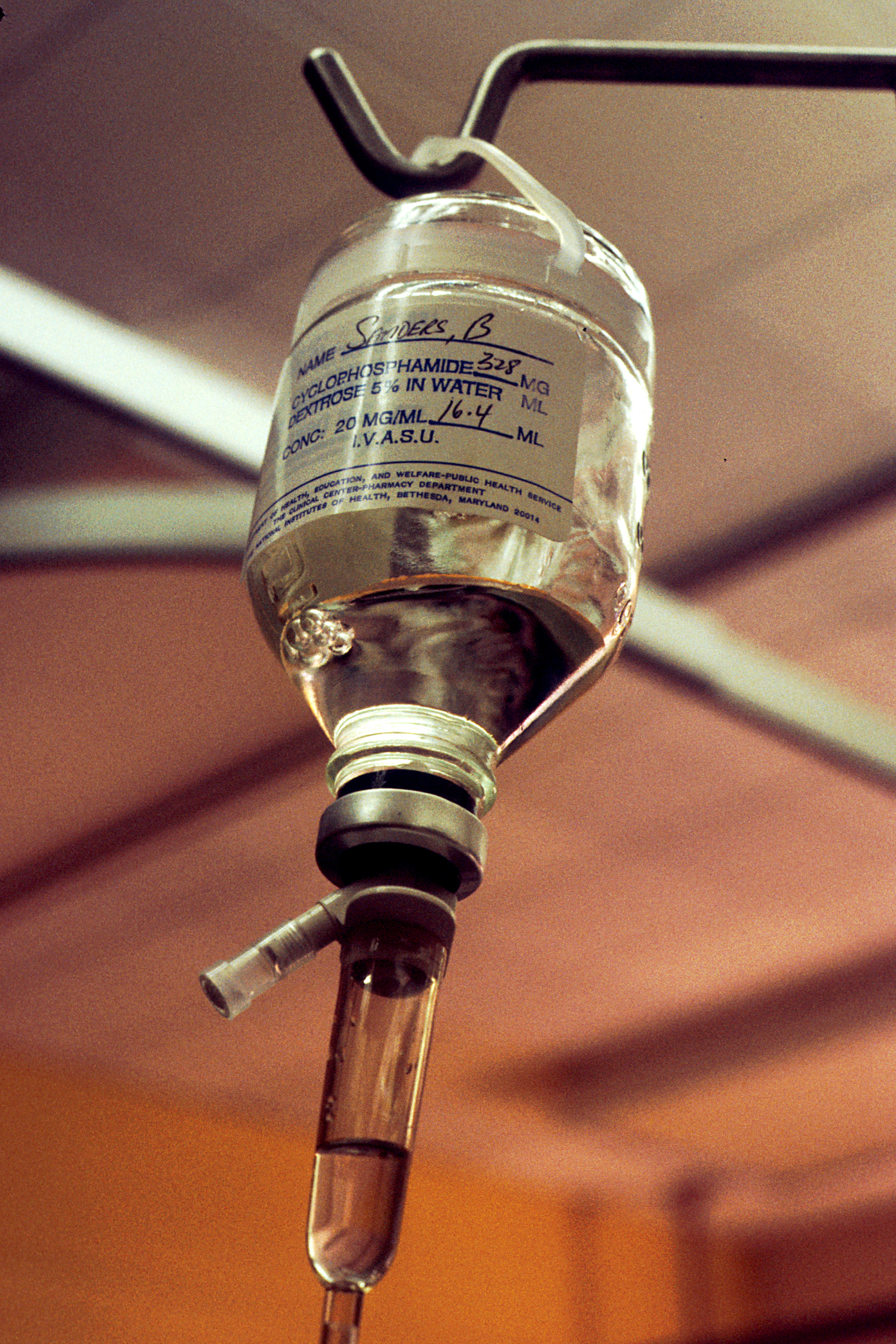
Plastic handle (hanger) for glass IV bottle
