= Drawer pull =

Handle for opening a drawer

A drawer pull (wire pull or simply pull) is a handle to pull a drawer out of a chest of drawers, cabinet or other furniture piece.

A drawer pull often includes an escutcheon plate to (or through) which the handle is fastened. The handle may swing from one or two mounts ("drop handle" or "swing handle"), a form of bail handle, making a drop drawer pull. The handle may also be permanently fastened to the plate. The plate may be ornamented by piercing, embossing, or engraving, and may receive decorative finishes such as plating, etching, and antiquing. Handle stock may be round, rectangular, or irregular forged shapes.

Drawer pulls may also be in one piece, either a handle only, typically U-shaped or a form of knob, or a plate shaped into a grip. Cup, shell, and bin styles are popular versions of the latter, with or without an integral backing plate.

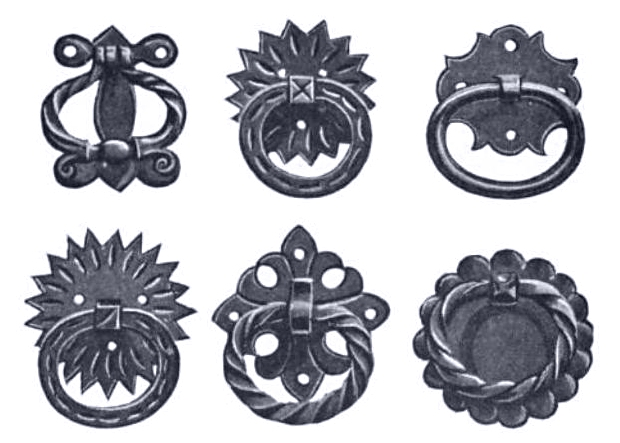
Bail handle drawer pulls

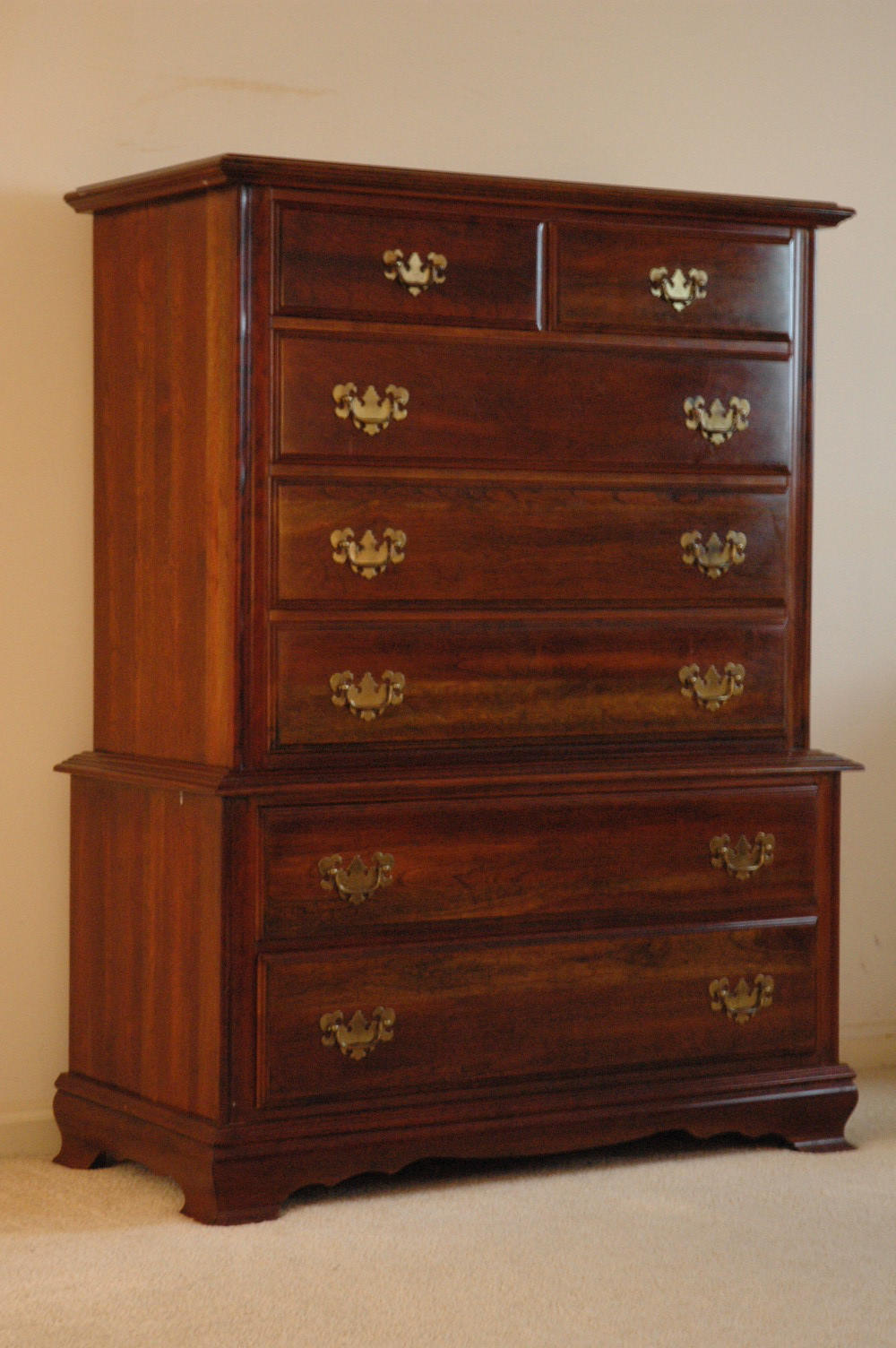
A highboy full of drawer pulls, backed by eschutcheon plates

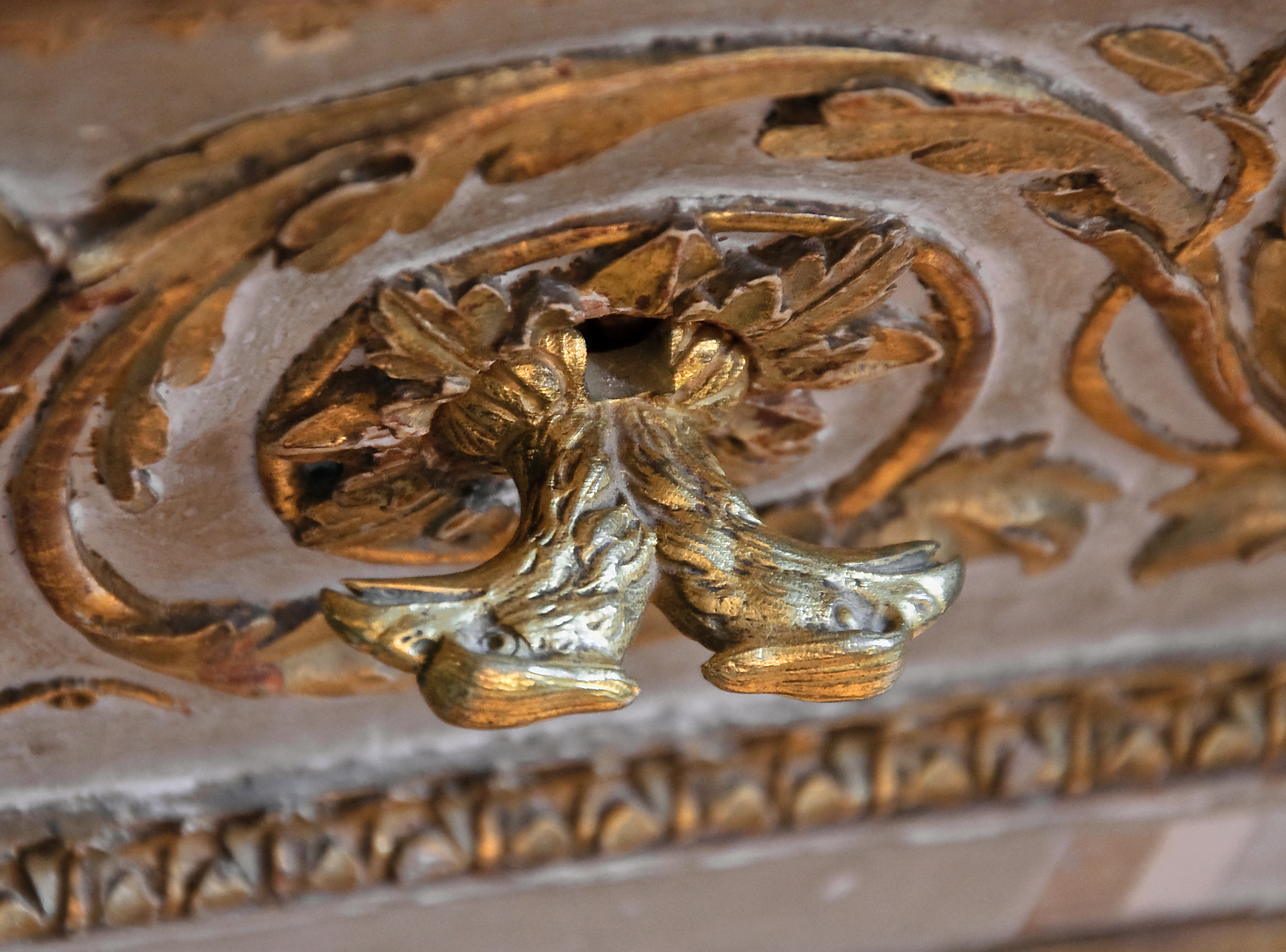
Drawer pull in the shape of a double-headed eagle, Petit appartement de la reine, Palace of Versailles

== See also ==
- Cord pull
- Door knocker
- Door handle
