= Handle =

Part of device designed to be held

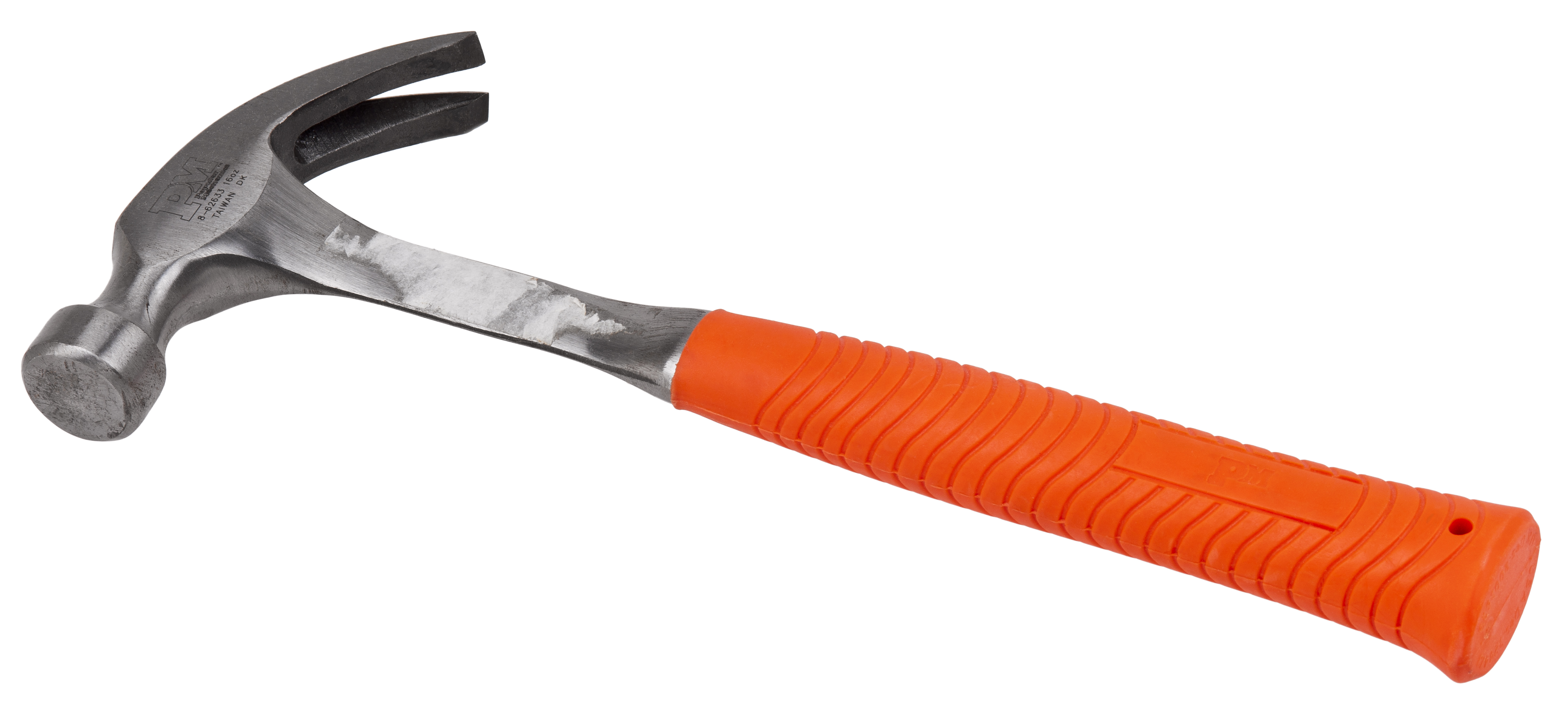
A modern claw hammer with rubber-coated handle.

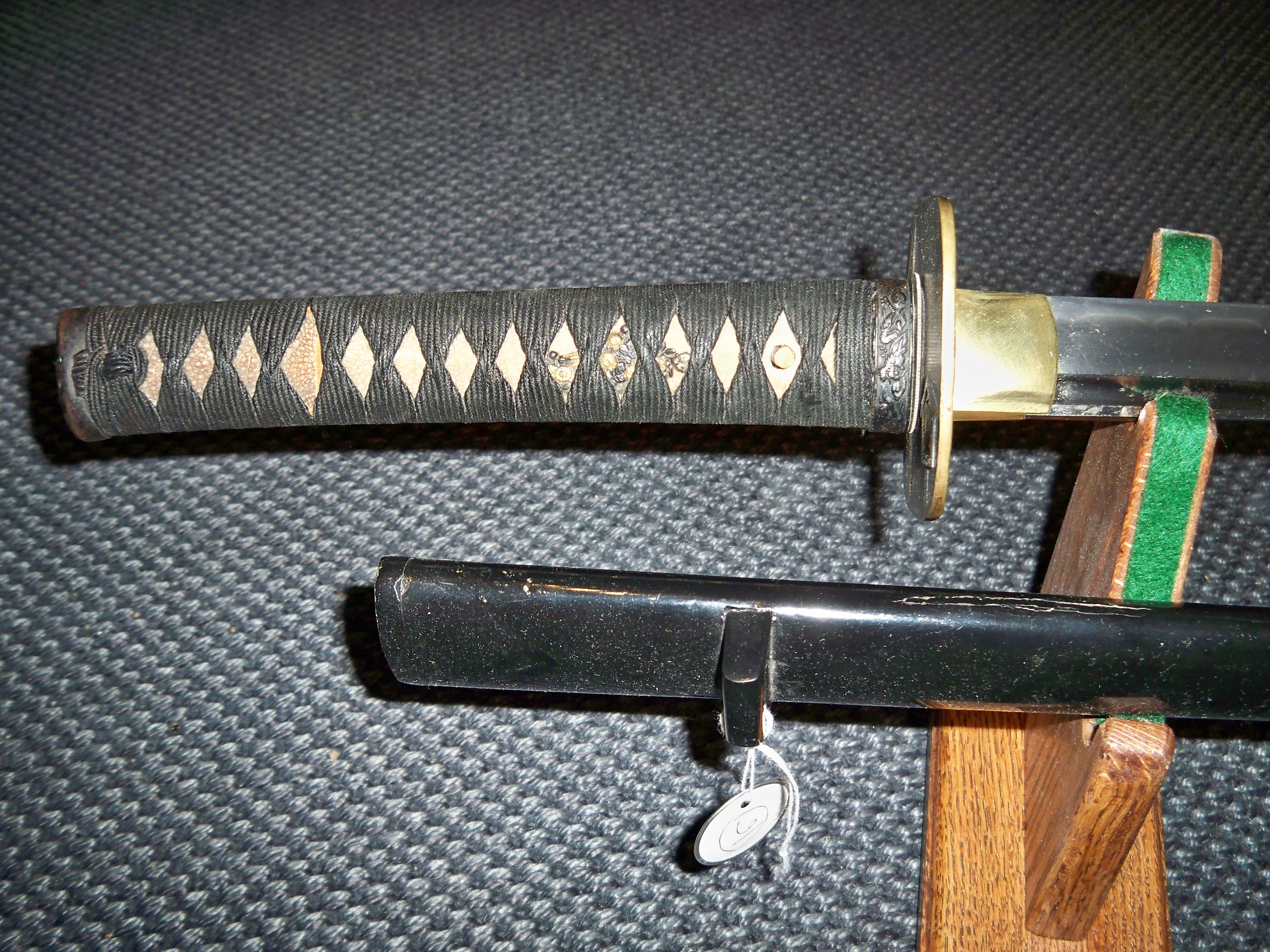
A tsuka-maki covered sword handle.

A handle is a part of, or an attachment to, an object that allows it to be grasped and manipulated by hand. The design of each type of handle involves consideration of ergonomic issues, even when dealt with intuitively or by following tradition. Handles for tools are an important part of their function, enabling the user to exploit the tools to maximum effect. Package handles allow for convenient carrying of packages.

== General design criteria ==
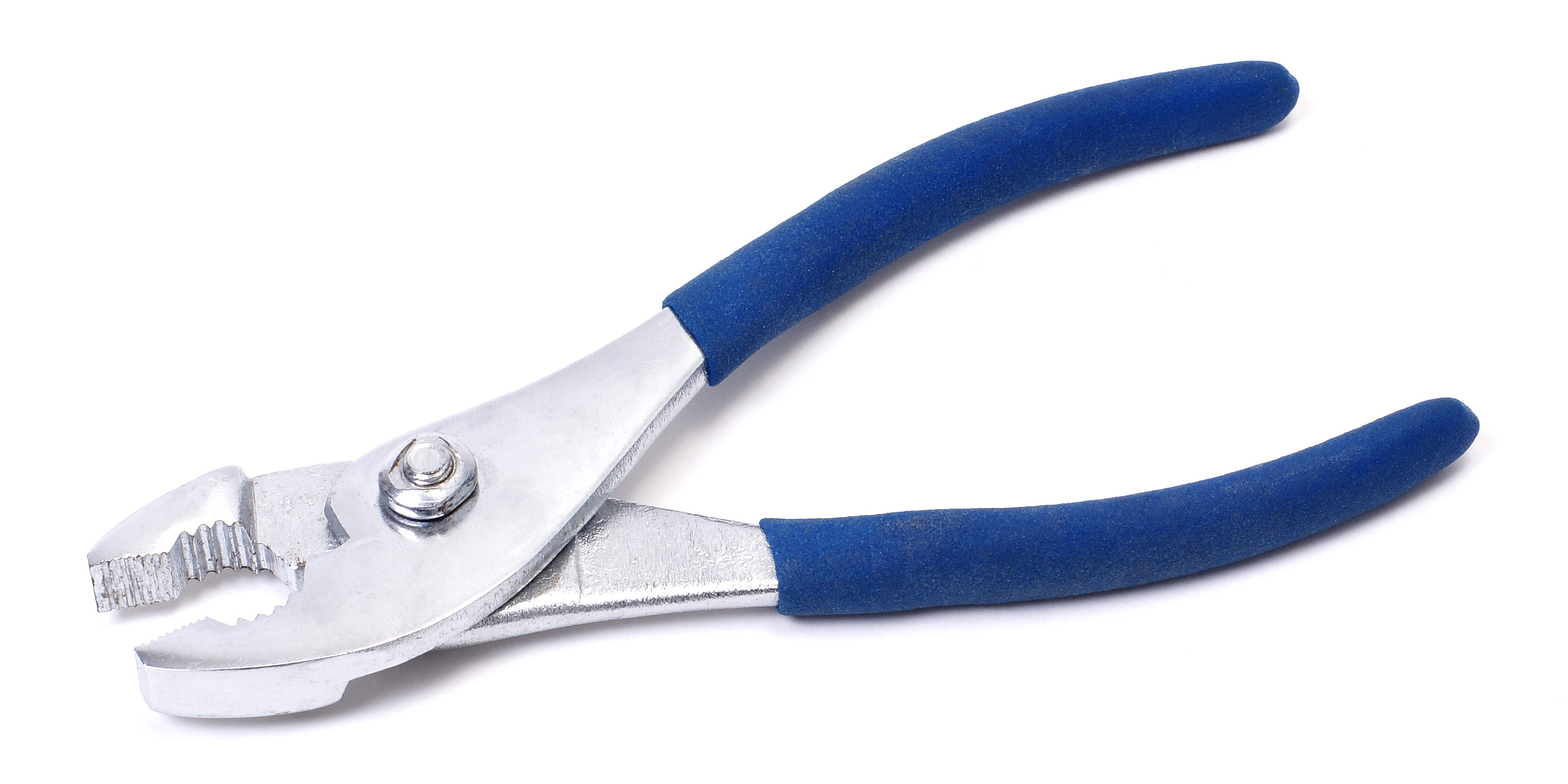
Flat-nose pliers with thermoplastic handles.

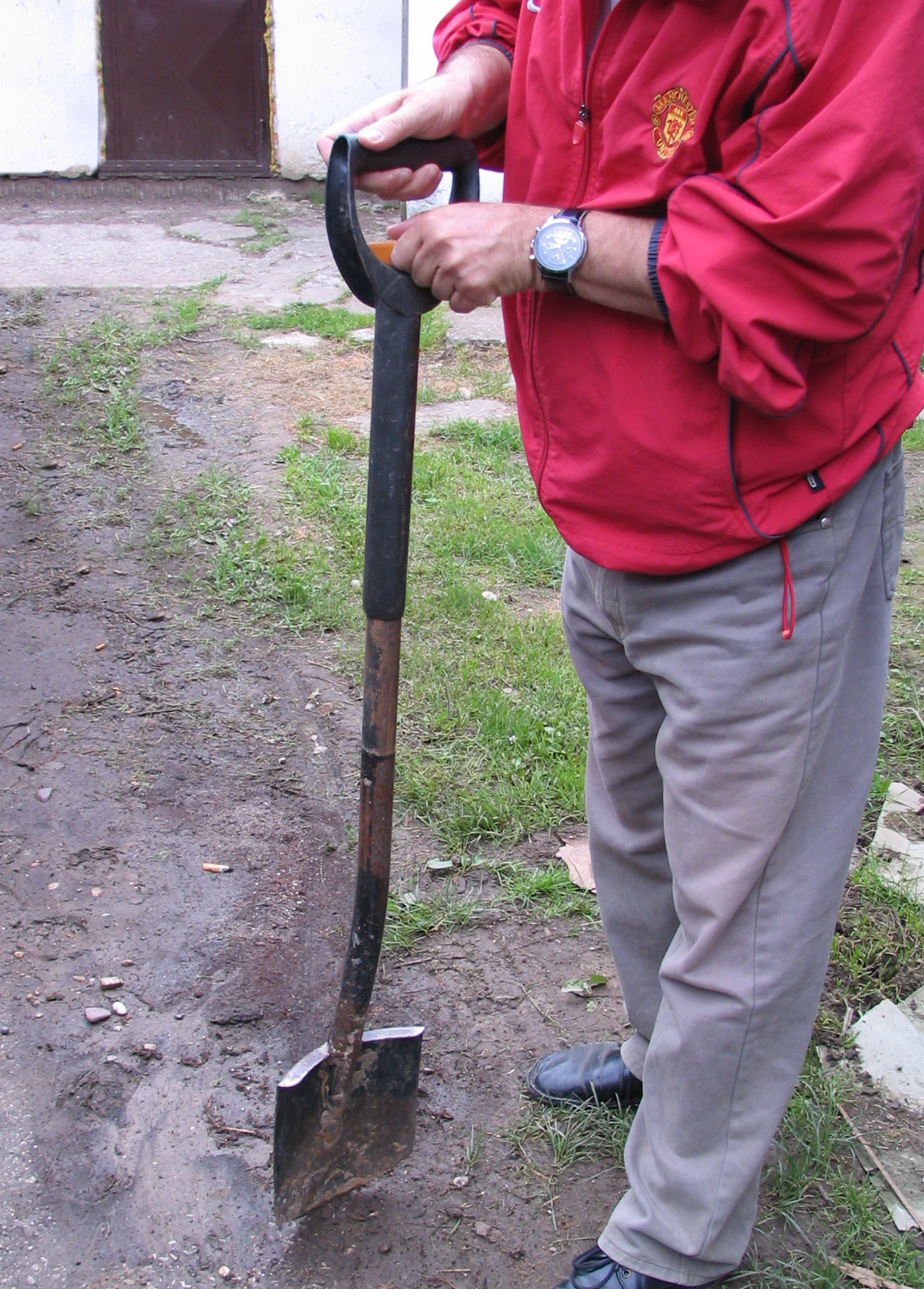
Spade with handle.

The three nearly universal requirements of are:

1. Sufficient strength to support the object, or to otherwise transmit the force involved in the task the handle serves.
2. Sufficient length to permit the hand or hands gripping it to comfortably exert the force.
3. Sufficiently small circumference to permit the hand or hands to surround it far enough to grip it as solidly as needed to exert that force.

== Specific needs ==
Other requirements may apply to specific handles:

- A sheath or coating on the handle that provides friction against the hand, reducing the gripping force needed to achieve a reliable grip.
- Designs such as recessed car-door handles, reducing the chance of accidental operation, or simply the inconvenience of "snagging" the handle.
- Sufficient circumference to distribute the force comfortably and safely over the hand. An example where this requirement is almost the sole purpose for a handle's existence is the handle that consists of two pieces: a hollow wooden cylinder about the diameter of a finger and a bit longer than one hand-width, and a stiff wire that passes through the center of the cylinder, has two right angles, and is shaped into a hook at each end. This handle permits comfortable carrying, with otherwise bare hands, of a heavy package, suspended on a tight string that passes around the top and bottom of it: the string is strong enough to support it, but the pressure the string would exert on fingers that grasped it directly would often be unacceptable.
- Design to thwart unwanted access, for example, by children or thieves. In these cases many of the other requirements may have reduced importance. For example, a child-proof doorknob can be difficult for even an adult to use.

== Pull handles ==
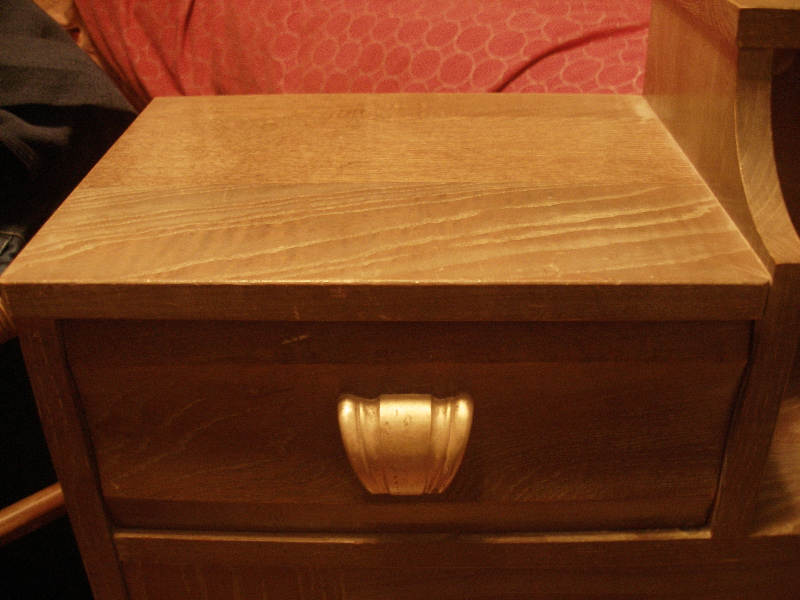
Many drawers use pull handles.

One major category of handles are pull handles, where one or more hands grip the handle or handles, and exert force to shorten the distance between the hands and their corresponding shoulders. The three criteria stated above are universal for pull handles.

Many pull handles are for lifting, mostly on objects to be carried.

Horizontal pull handles are widespread, including drawer pulls, handles on latchless doors and the outside of car doors. The inside controls for opening car doors from inside are usually pull handles, although their function of permitting the door to be pushed open is accomplished by an internal unlatching linkage.

Pull handles are also a frequent host of common door handle bacteria such as e-coli, fungal or other viral infections.

Two kinds of pull handles may involve motion in addition to the hand-focused motions described:

- Pulling the starting cord on a small internal-combustion engine may, besides moving the hand toward the shoulder, also exploit simultaneously pushing a wheeled vehicle away with the other hand, stepping away from the engine, and/or standing from a squat.
- Some throwing motions, as in a track-and-field hammer throw, involve pulling on a handle against centrifugal force (without bringing it closer), in the course of accelerating the thrown object by forcing it into circular motion.

== Twist handles ==
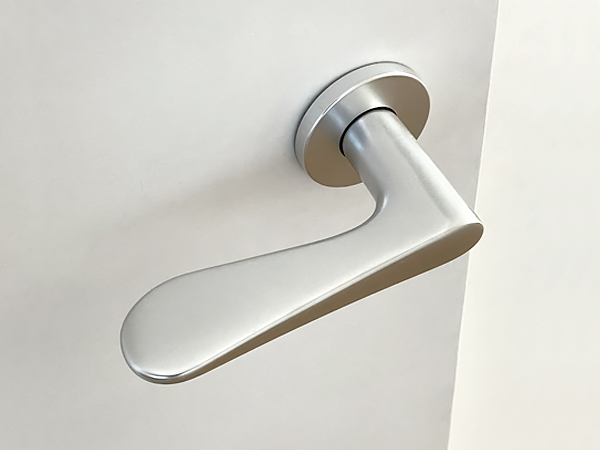
Many doors use twist handles.

Another category of hand-operated device requires grasping (but not pulling) and rotating the hand and either the lower arm or the whole arm, about their axis. When the grip required is a fist grip, as with a door handle that has an arm rather than a knob to twist, the term "handle" unambiguously applies. Another clear case is a rarer device seen on mechanically complicated doors like those of airliners, where (instead of the whole hand moving down as it also rotates, on the door handles just described) the axis of rotation is between the thumb and the outermost fingers, so the thumb moves up if the outer fingers move down.

== Handles for wide-range motion ==
The handles of bicycle grips, club-style weapons, shovels and spades, axes, hammers, mallets and hatchets, baseball bats, rackets, golf clubs and croquet mallets involve a greater range of ergonomic issues.

== See also ==
- Hand truck
- Shopping trolley (caddy)
- Tsuka-maki
