= Package handle =

Packaging component

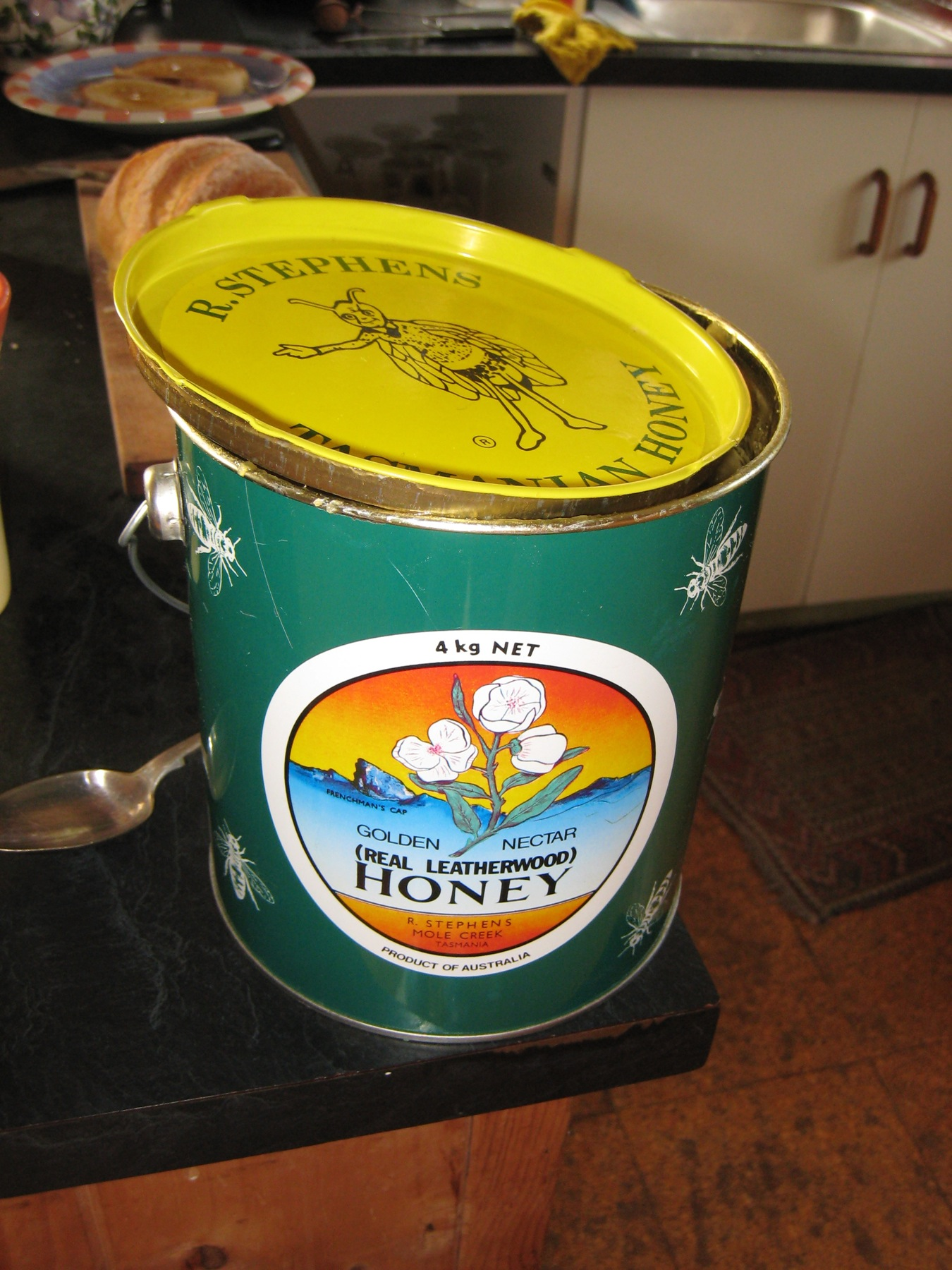
Wire bail handle attached to "ears" in metal paint can, used here for honey.

Package handles, or carriers, are used to help people use packaging. They are designed to simplify and to improve the ergonomics of lifting and carrying packages. Handles on consumer packages add convenience and help facilitate use and pouring. The effect of handles on package material costs and the packaging line efficiencies are also critical. A handle can be defined as "an accessory attached to a container or part for the purpose of holding or carrying." Sometimes a handle can be used to hang a package for dispensing or use.

Handles can be built into a package, sometimes in the form of hand holes or hand holds. They can also be attached to a finished complete package after filling and closing, or even at the point of purchase.

The performance and design criteria for handles are often detailed in a contract or specification. For example handles for some US government containers are specified in Mil-Std-648.

== History ==
People have long seen a need to have package forms which are easy for people to carry and to use. Some of these, such as Pithos and amphora, date from the Neolithic period. Handles have been formed into packages and containers such as pottery and stoneware. Wire, rope, and wicker have been added when needed.

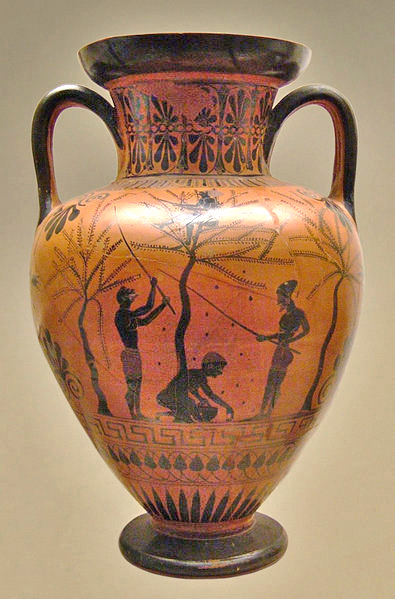
Amphora with built in handles

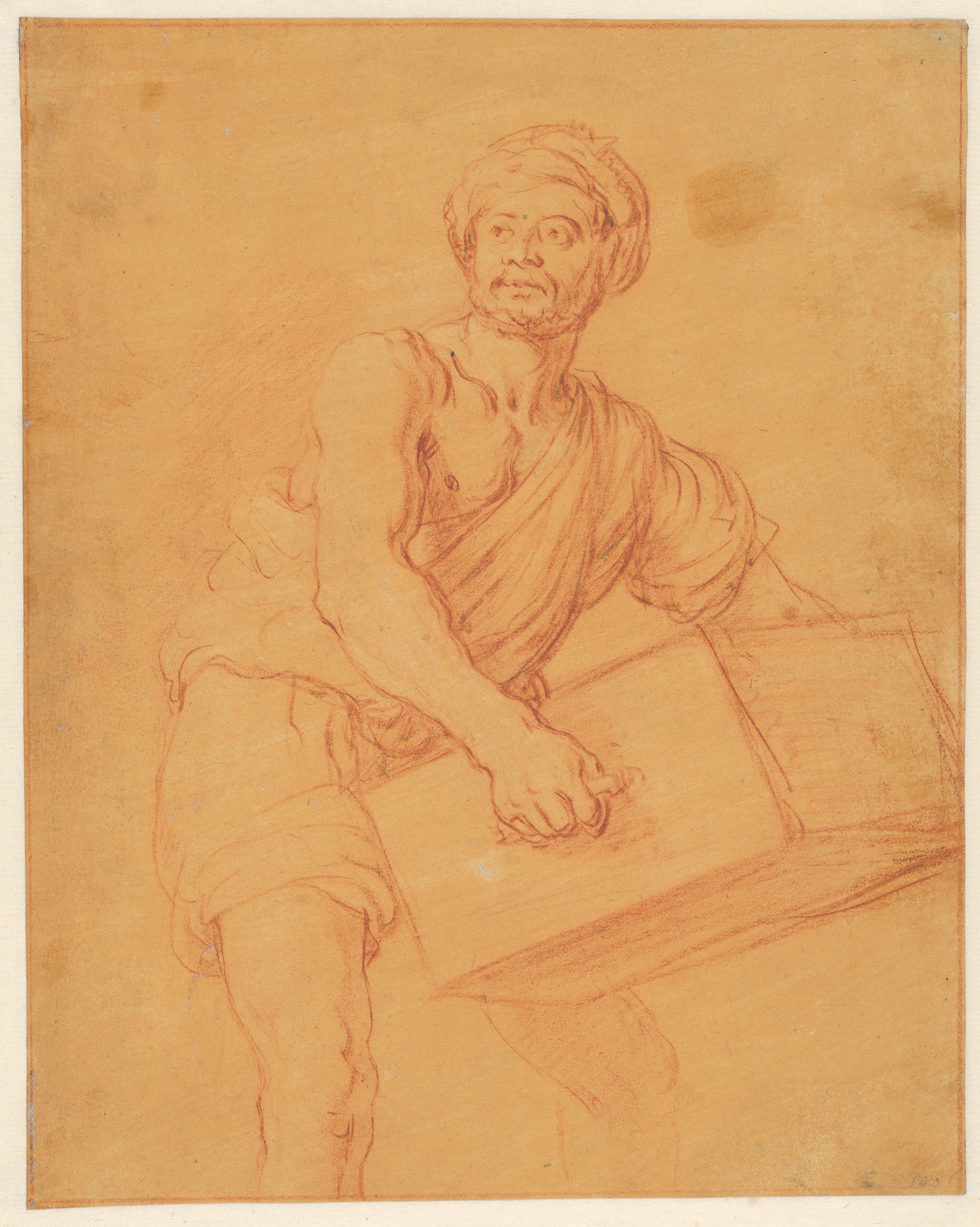
Man carrying a wooden box or chest, 1625

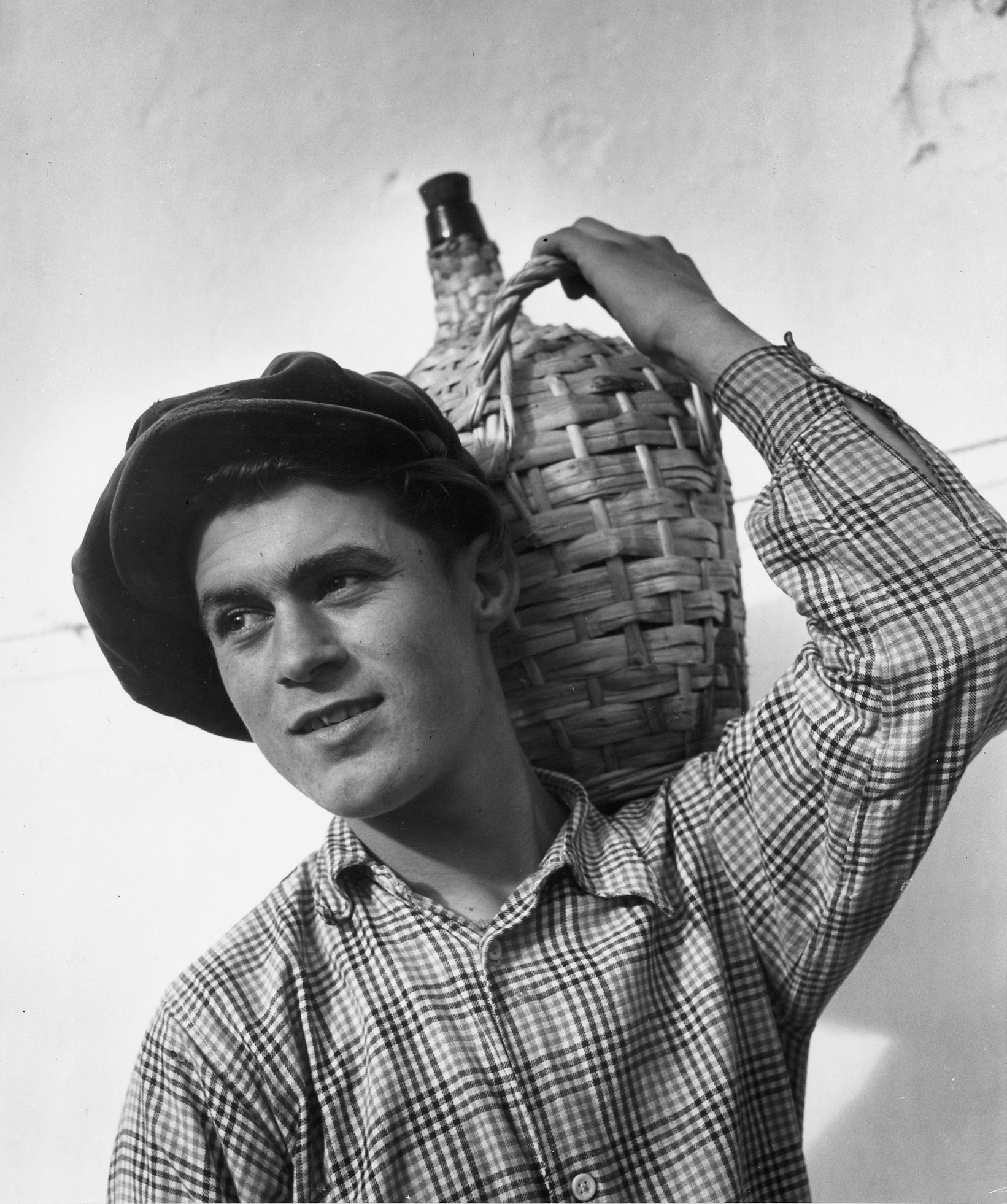
Man carrying a jug with woven wicker handle. Portugal, 1950

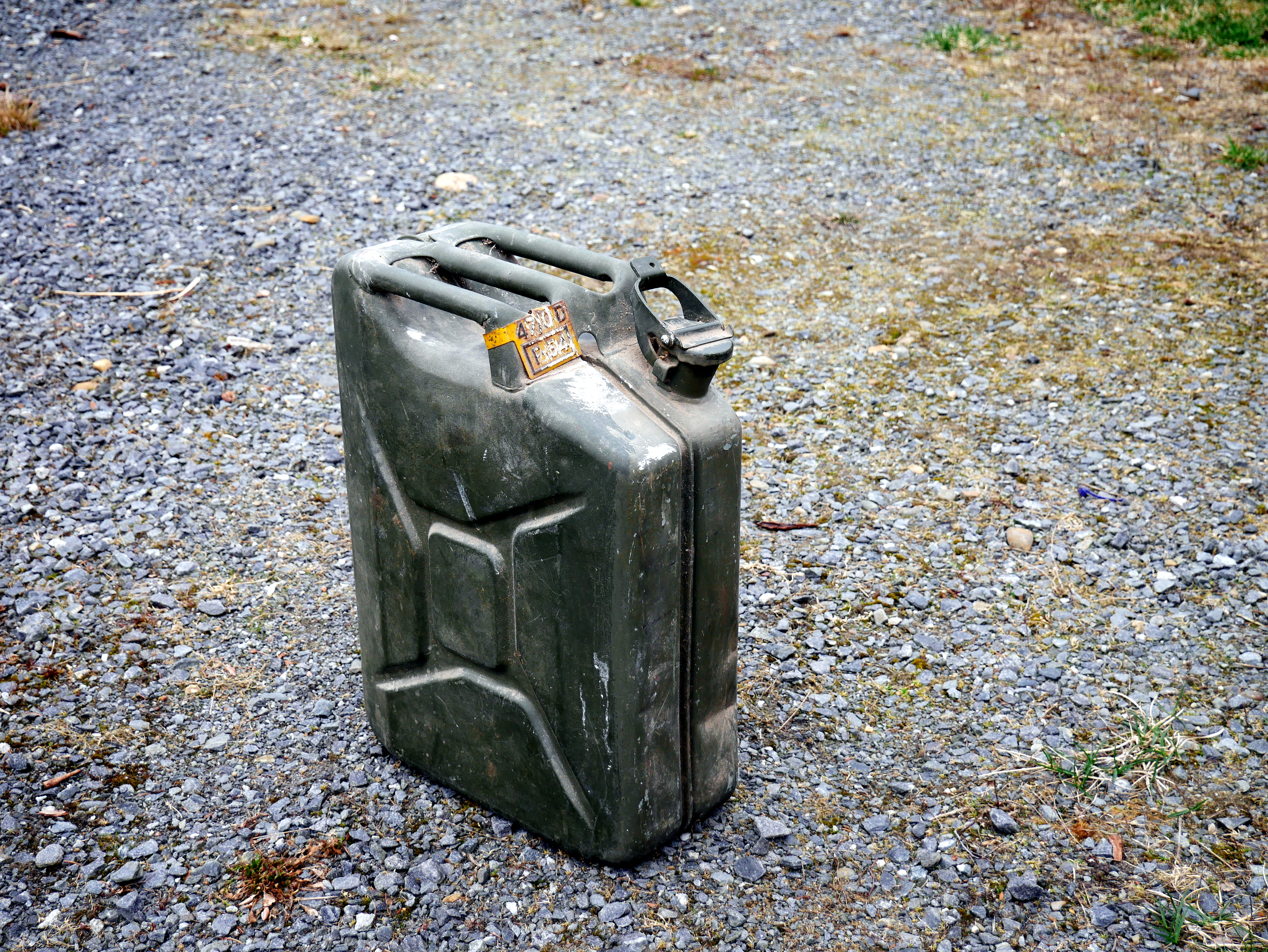
Jerrycan of fuel, WWII. Middle handle for empty can; two outer handles for two people carrying full can.

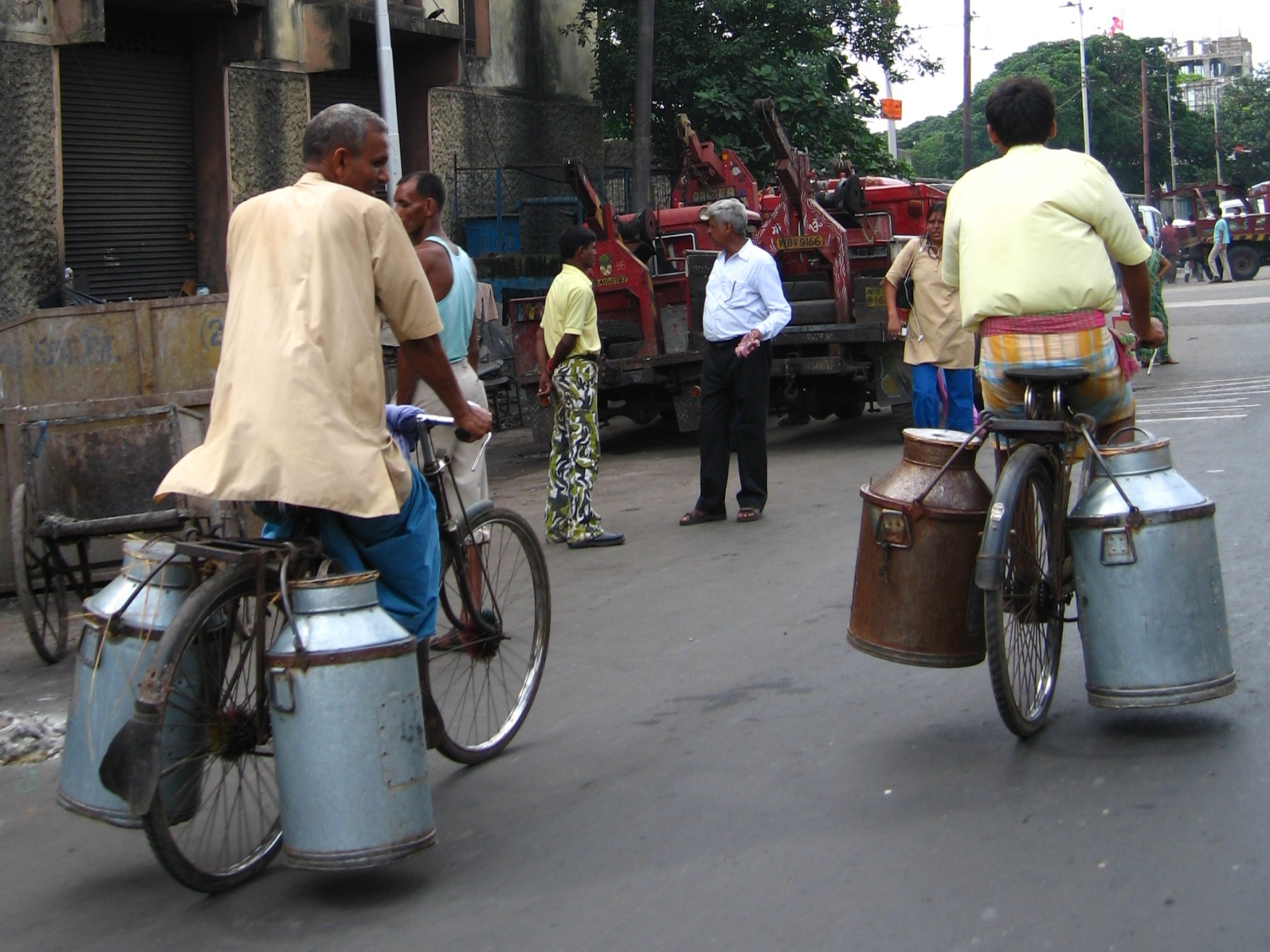
Handles on metal milk churns allow easy carrying

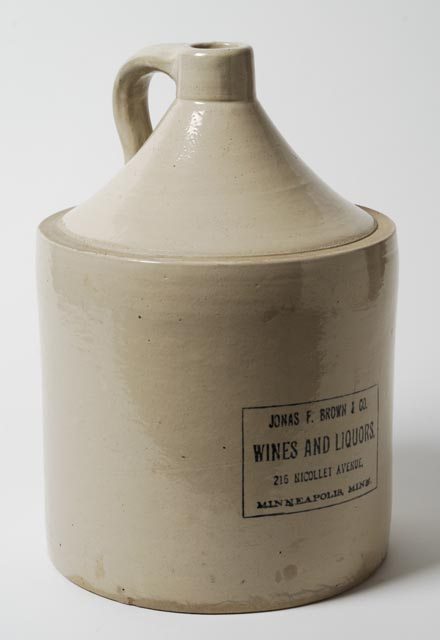
Stoneware jug

== Boxes ==
Wooden boxes often have hand holes or attached metal handles to facilitate handling. Steel boxes also frequently have attached handles or hinged bails.

Corrugated boxes can have hand holes die-cut into the ends to assist material handling tasks. Several designs are in use. Care must also be taken for the hand holes not to weaken the strength of the box.

Depending on the contents and the degree of handling required, reinforcement is sometimes needed to prevent tearing. Reinforcing tapes, whether pressure -sensitive or heat-activated, can be applied to boxes in the vicinity of hand holes.

Separate plastic or composite fitments are also available for corrugated boxes.

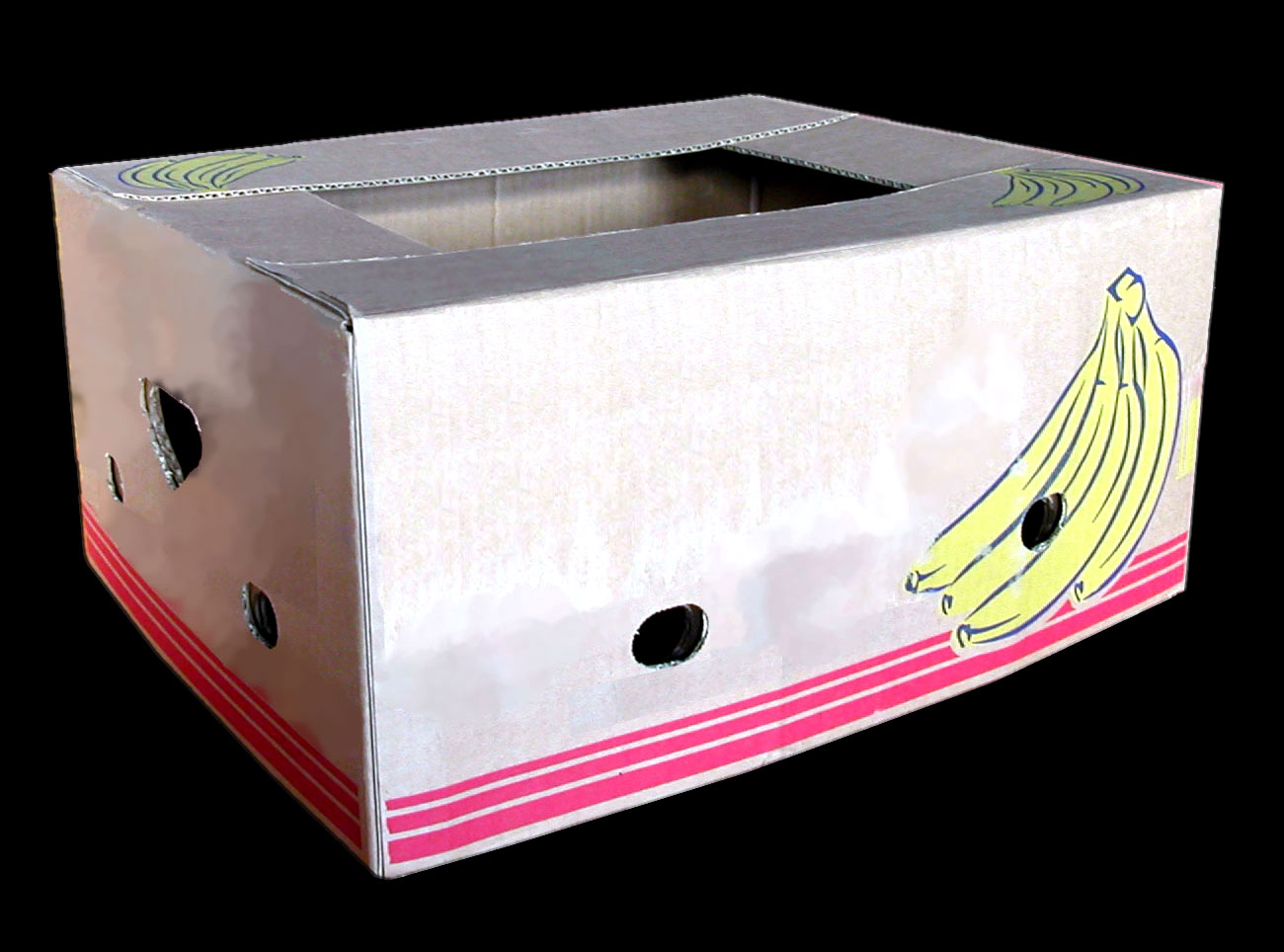
Telescope box used for bananas. Note hand holes and ventilation holes

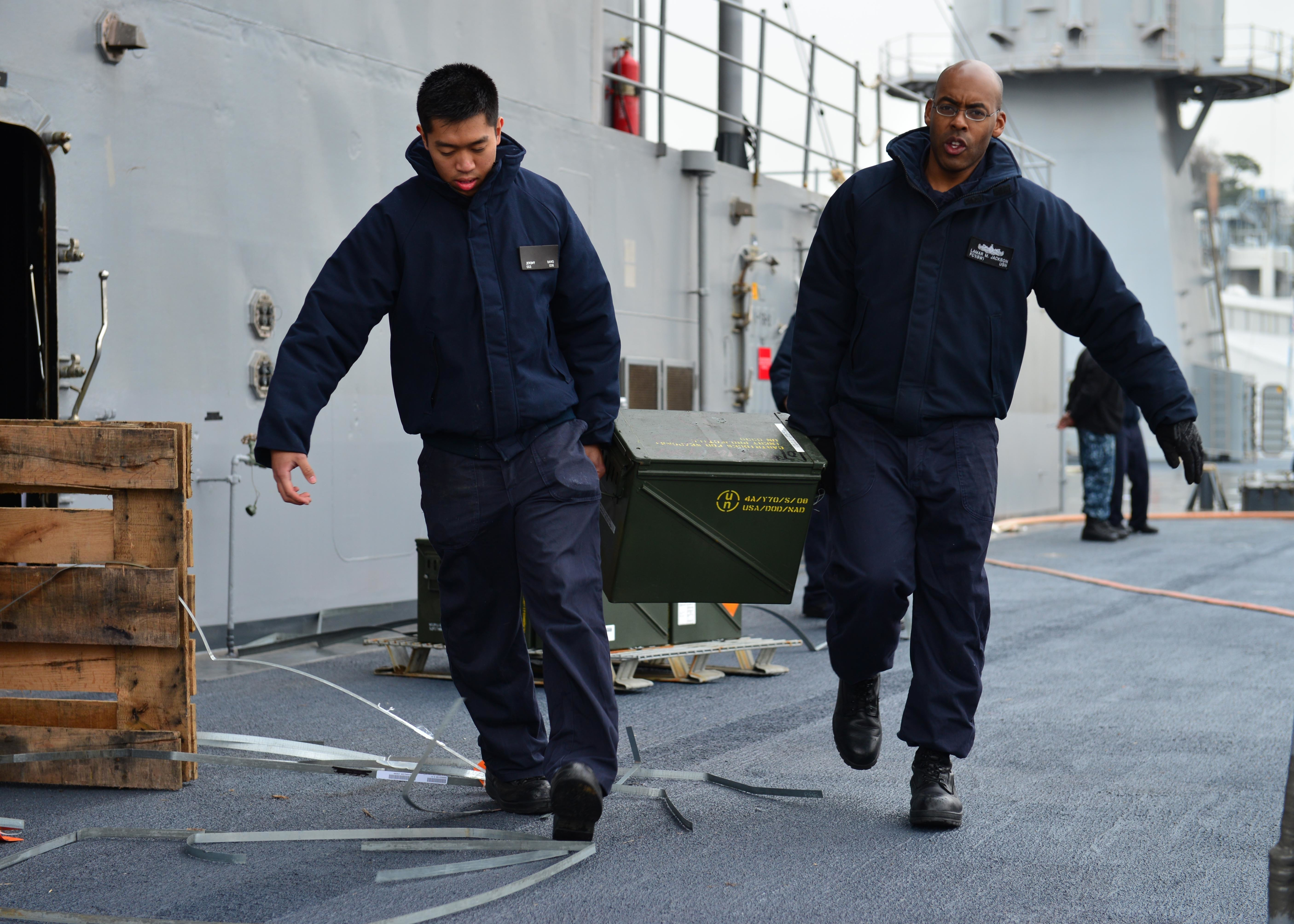
Handles on a metal ammunition box

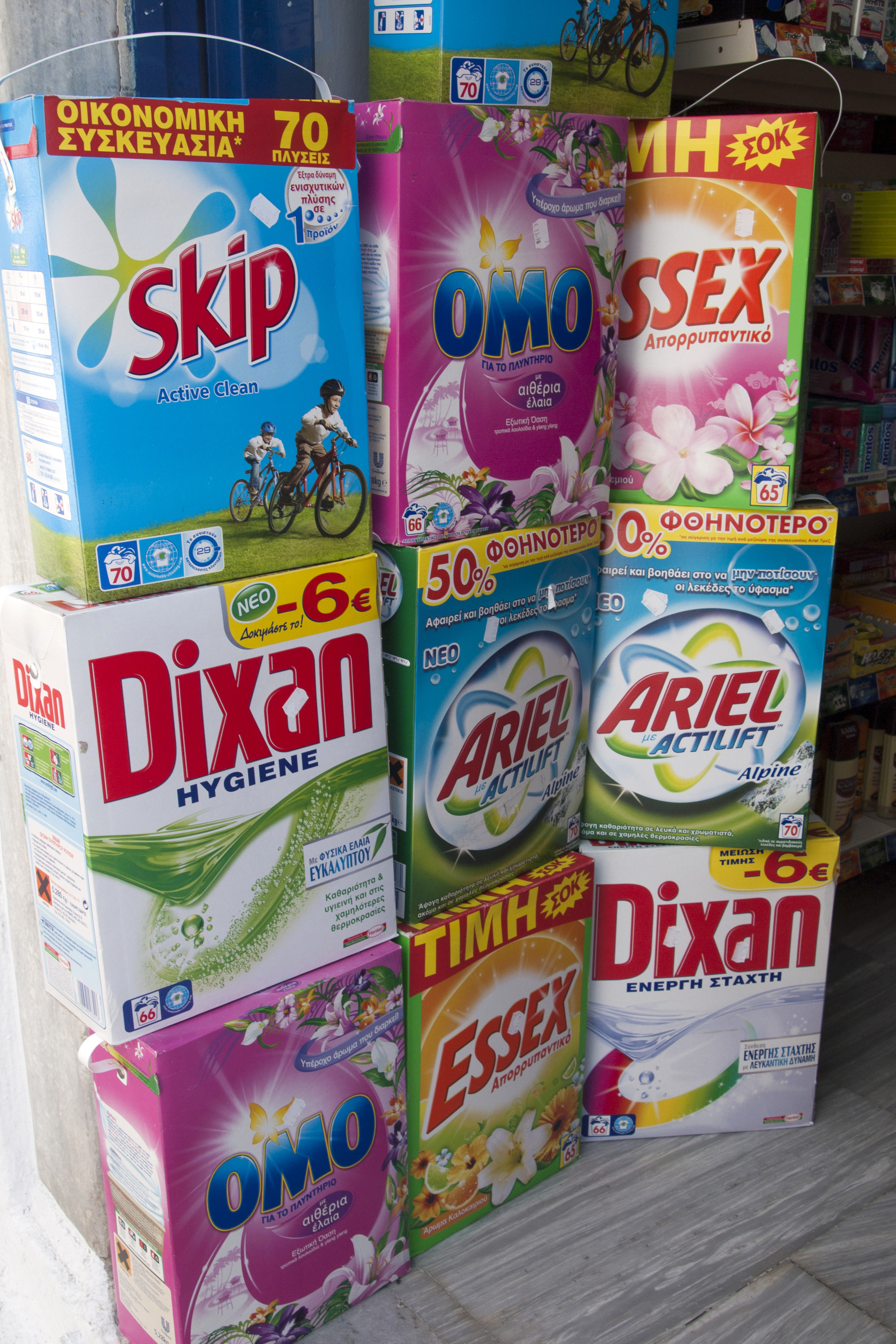
Boxes of Greek laundry detergent with handles

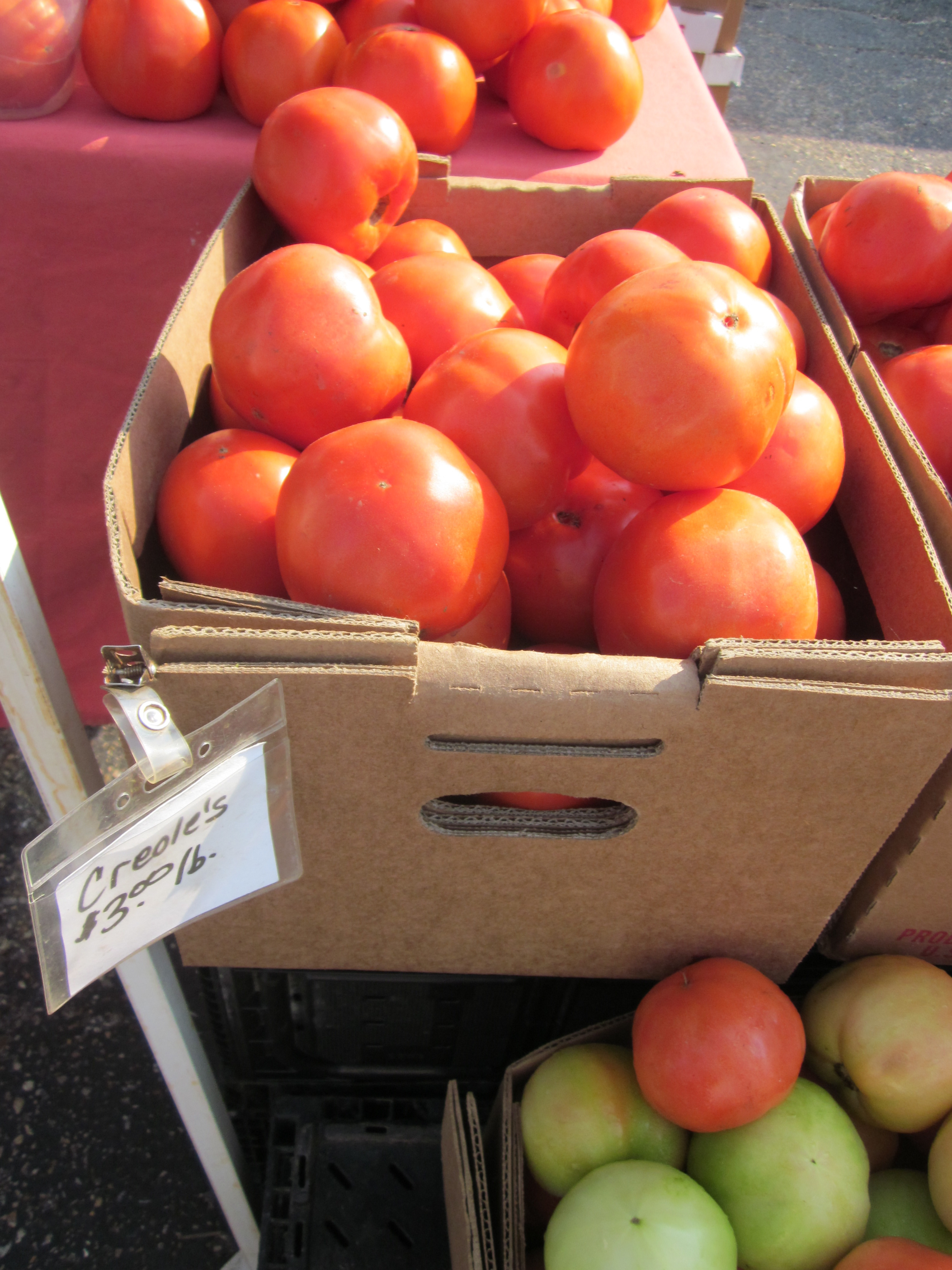
Corrugated tray of tomatoes at a farmers market

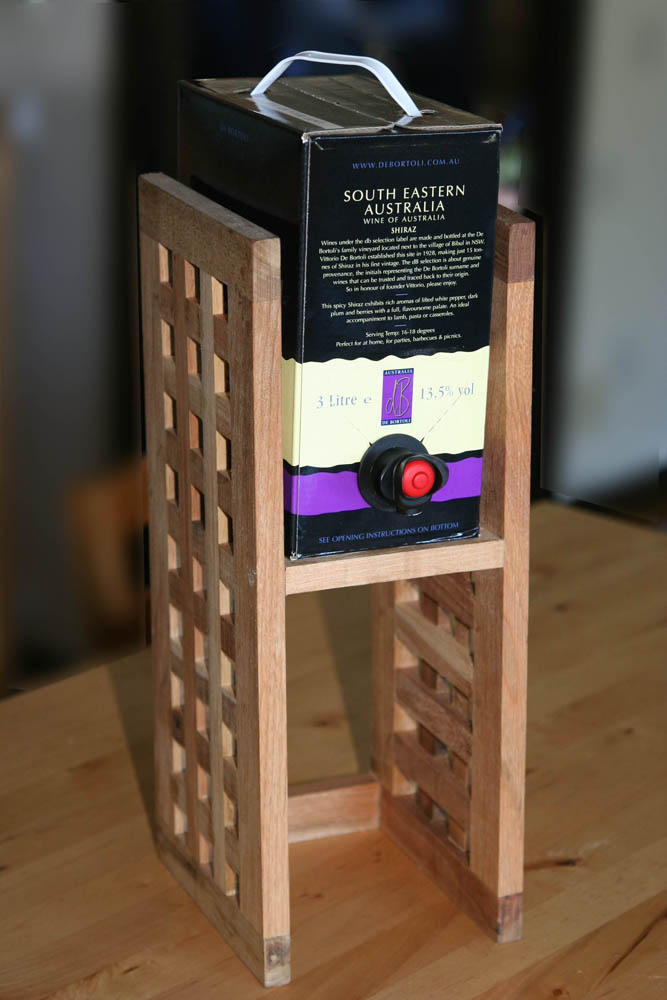
Box wine with a plastic handle inserted into holes in the top of the corrugated box

== Plastic bottles ==
Many plastic containers have built in handles. Plastic shipping containers and storage tubs often have handles moulded into them. Consumer blow moulded containers often have integral handles or are shaped to facilitate grasping. Hot water bottles often have a handle or hole for hanging.

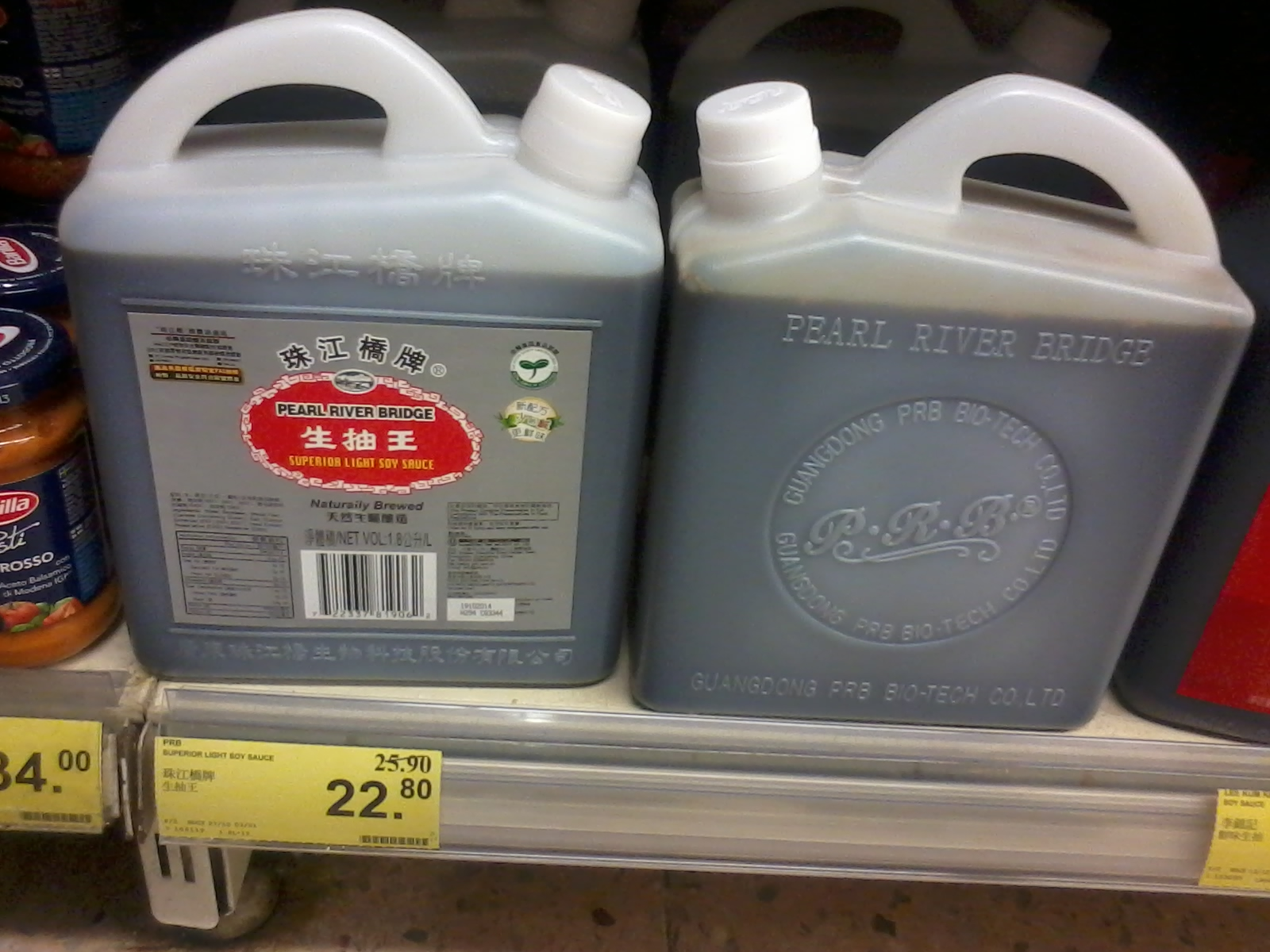
bulk soy sauce with handle on top

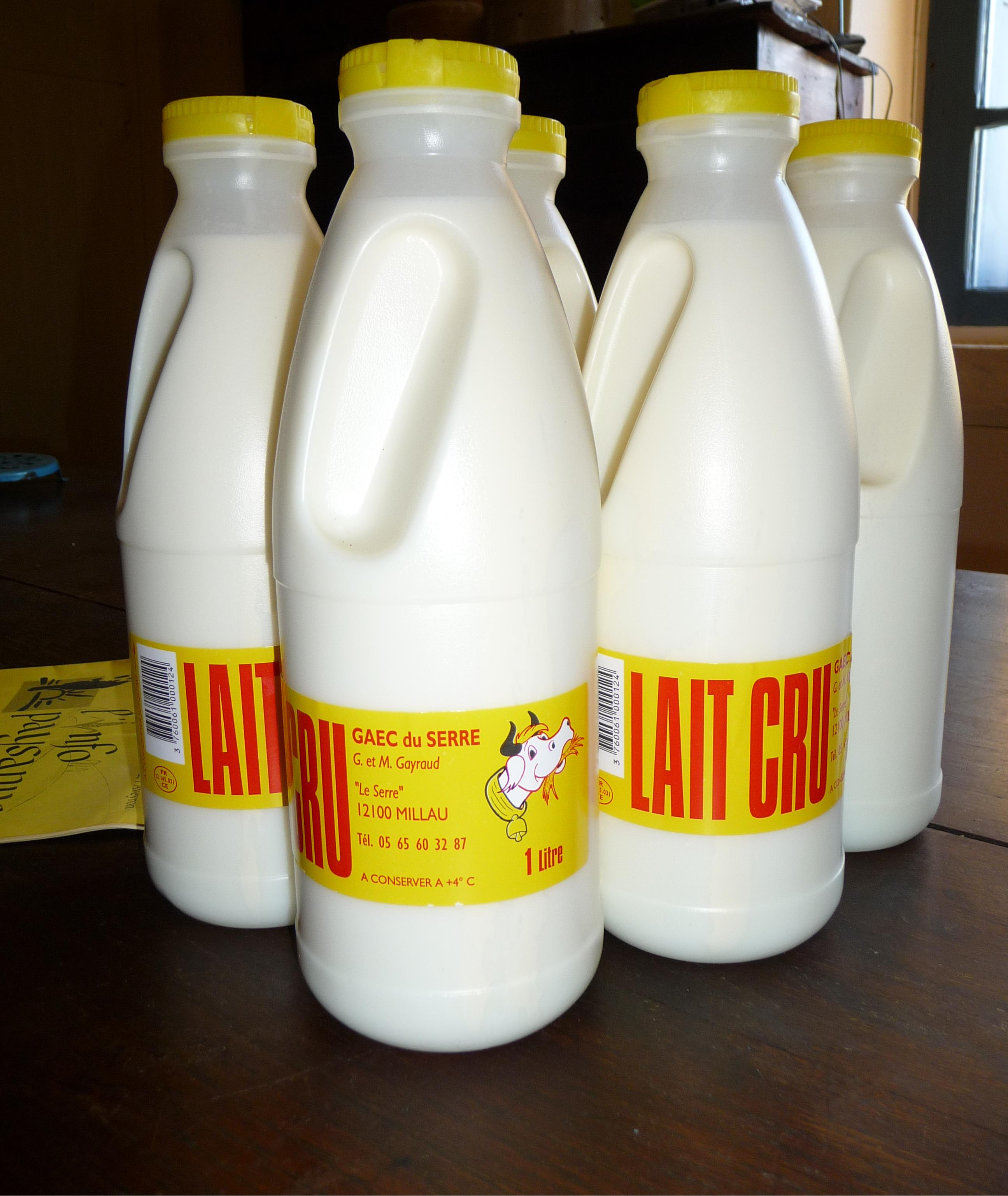
Blow molded plastic bottle of milk with indentations for a handle

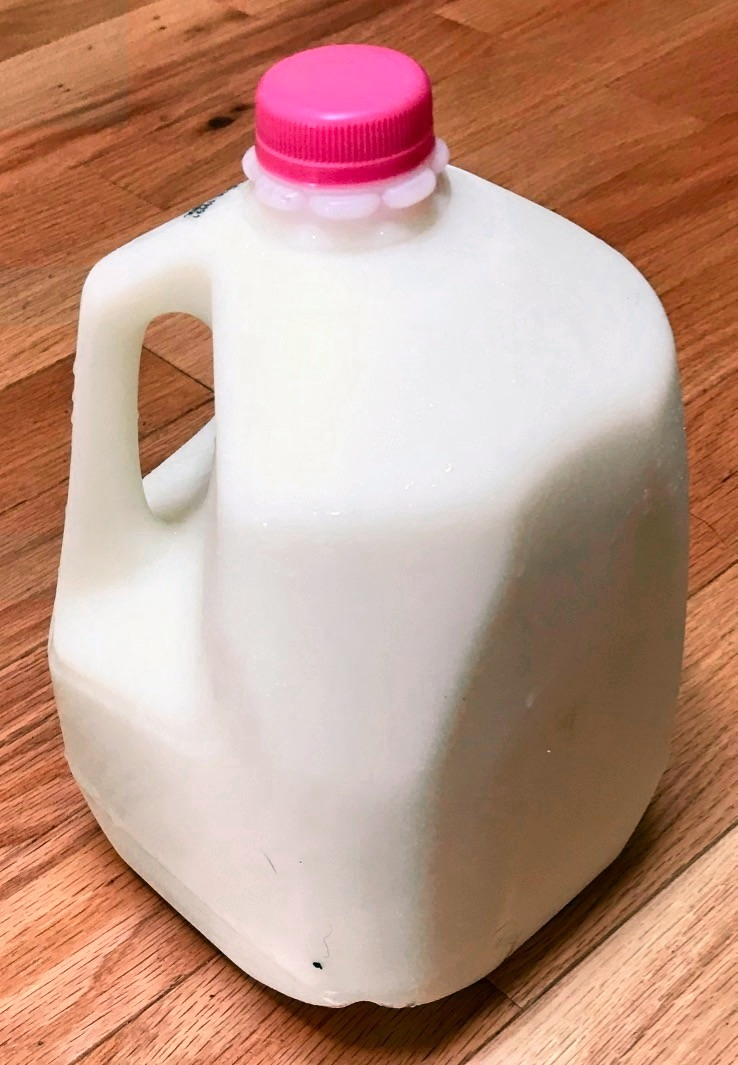
HDPE plastic bottle of milk, one US gallon

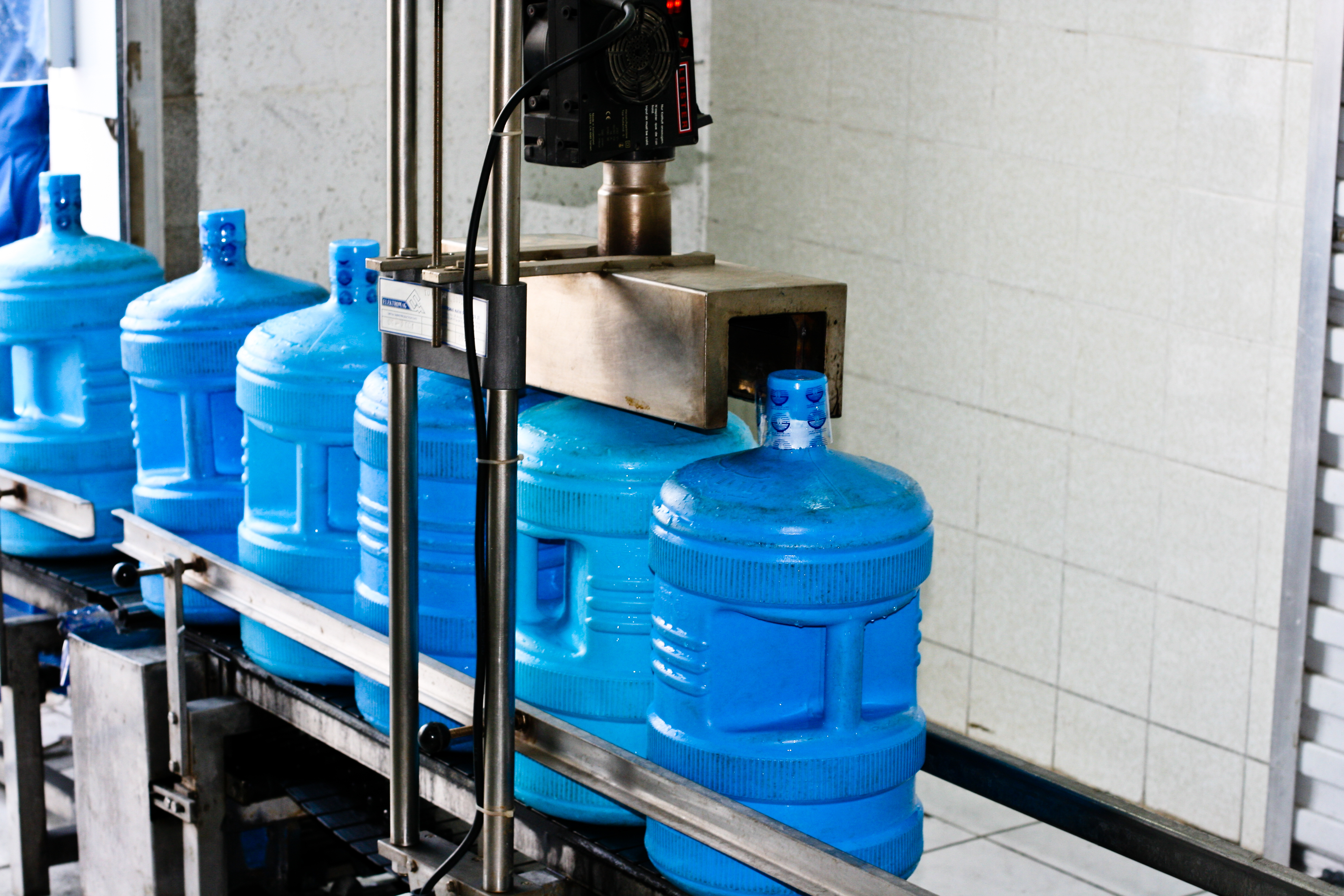
large reusable plastic bottles of water

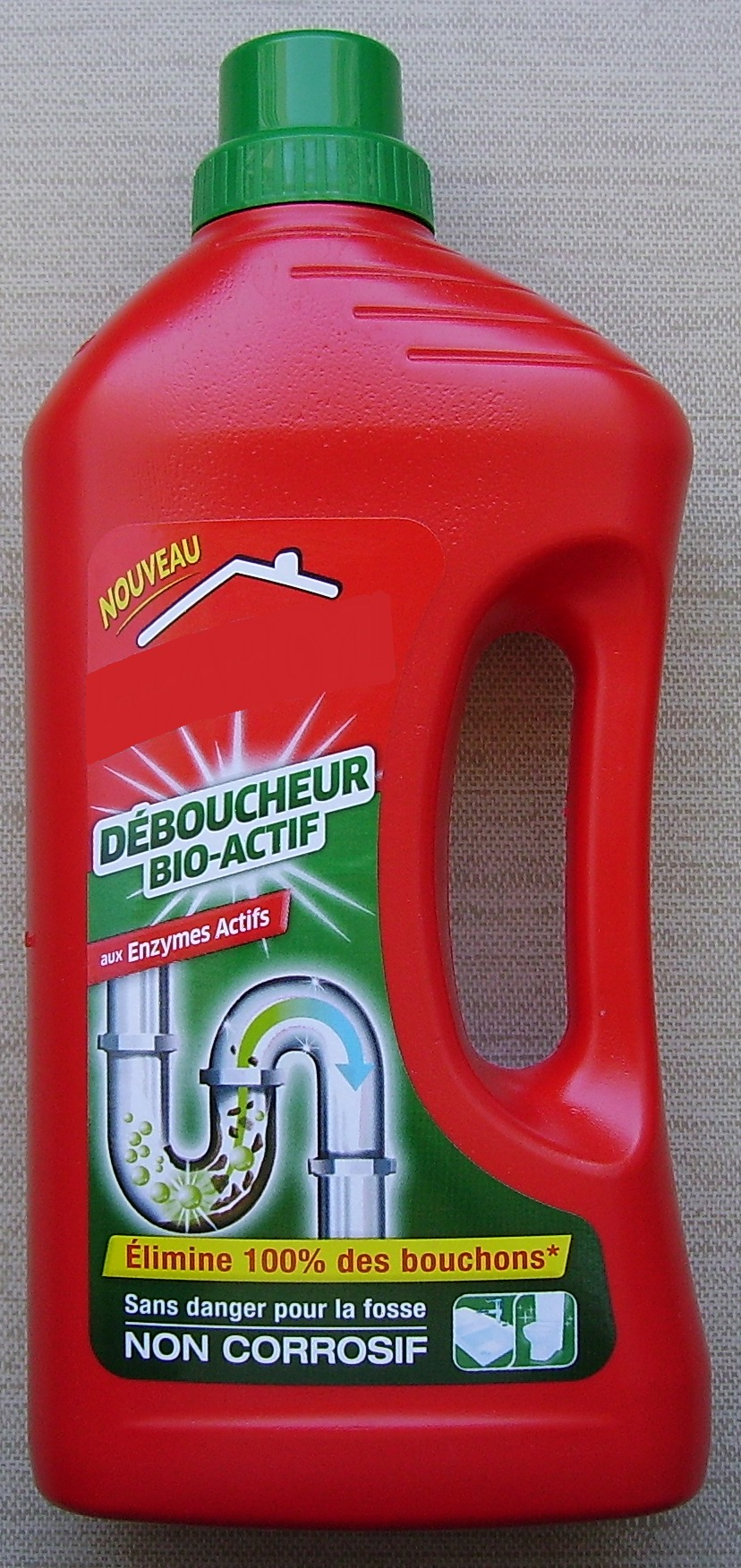
Drain cleaner with convenience handle

Separate handles are sometimes added to a bottle, usually around the neck at the closure. This simplifies the bottle forming process and can allow use of lighter weight bottles. Several methods have been developed.

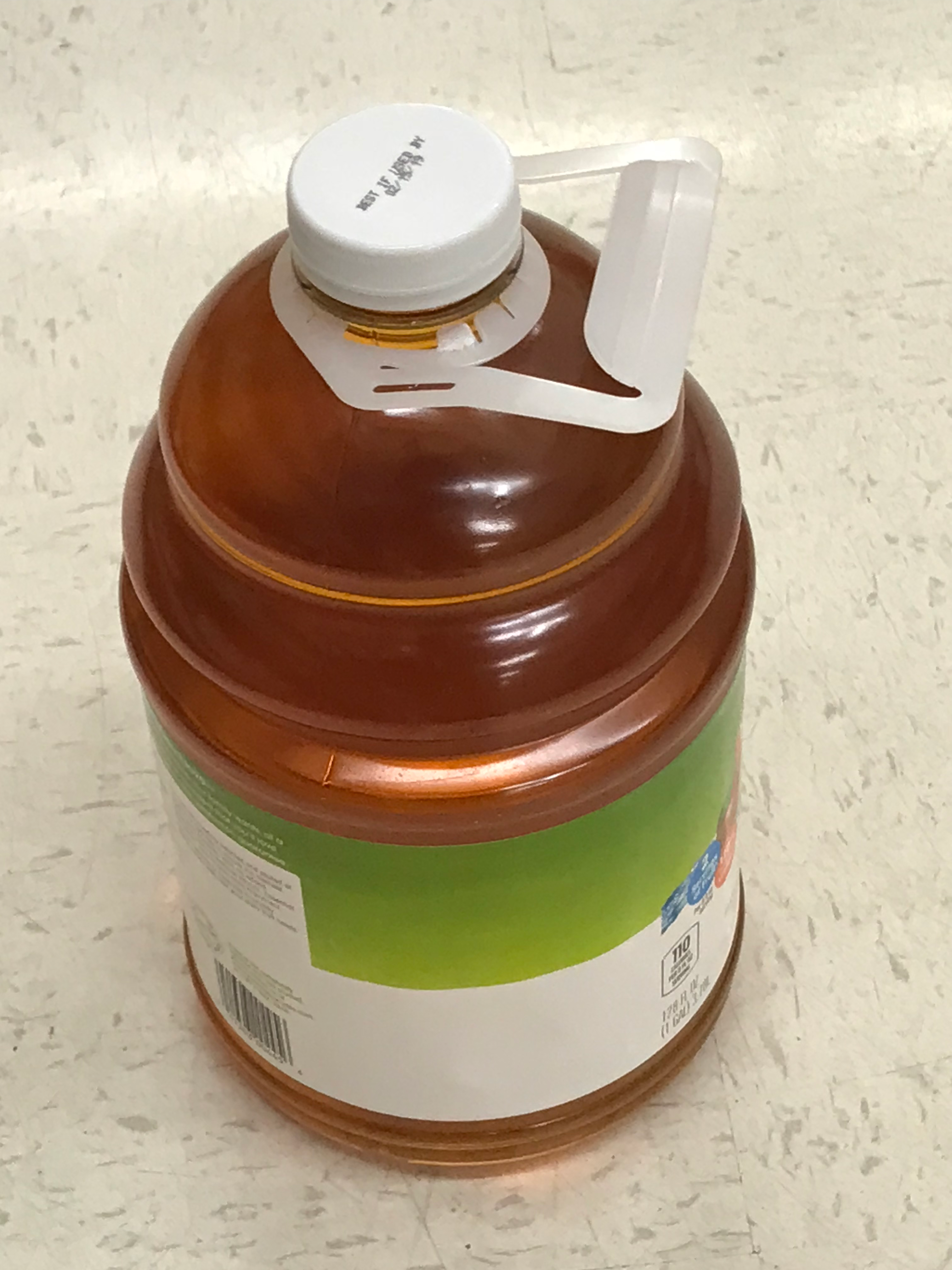
bottle of apple juice with added handle

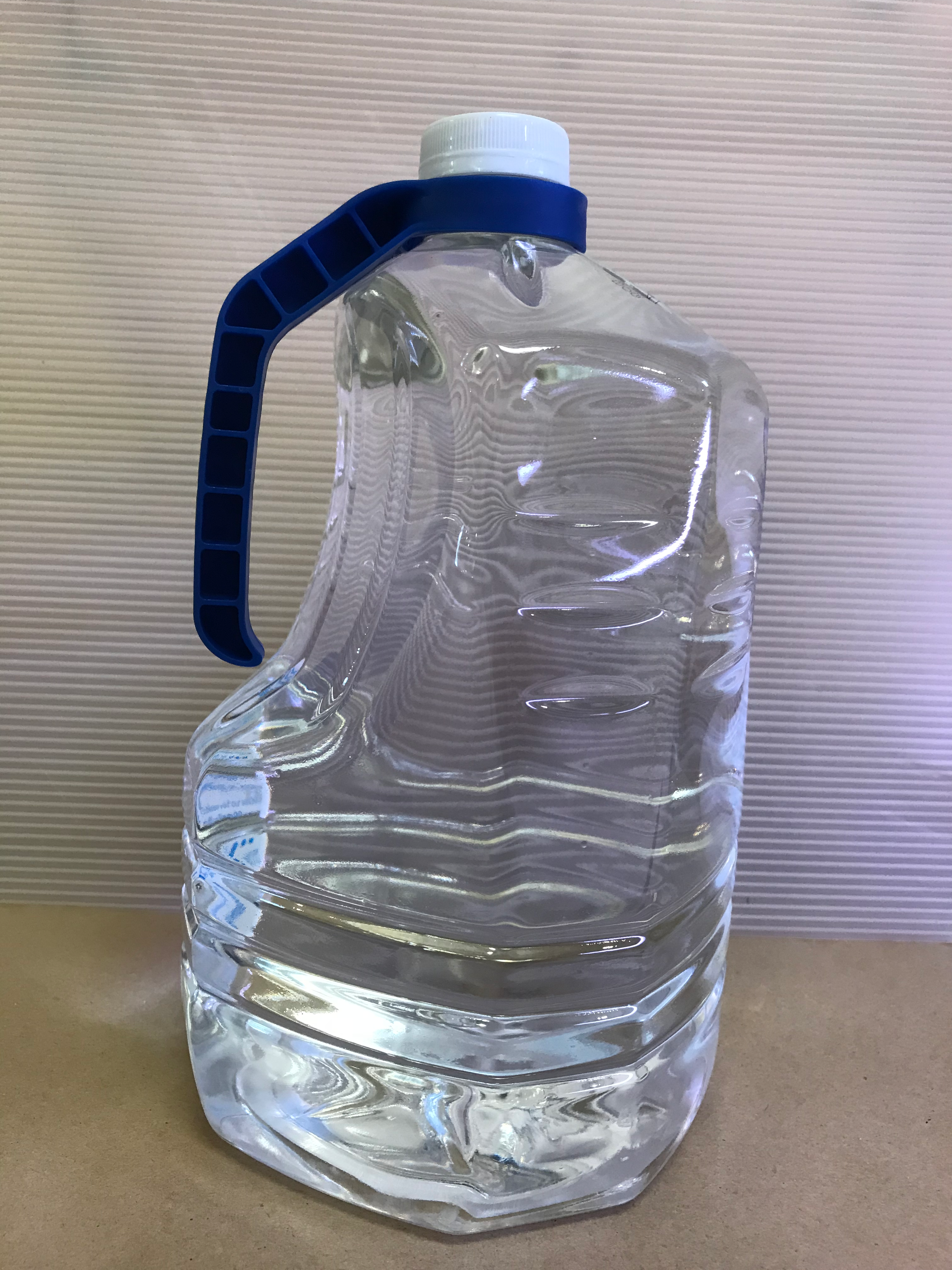
PETE water bottle with attached handle

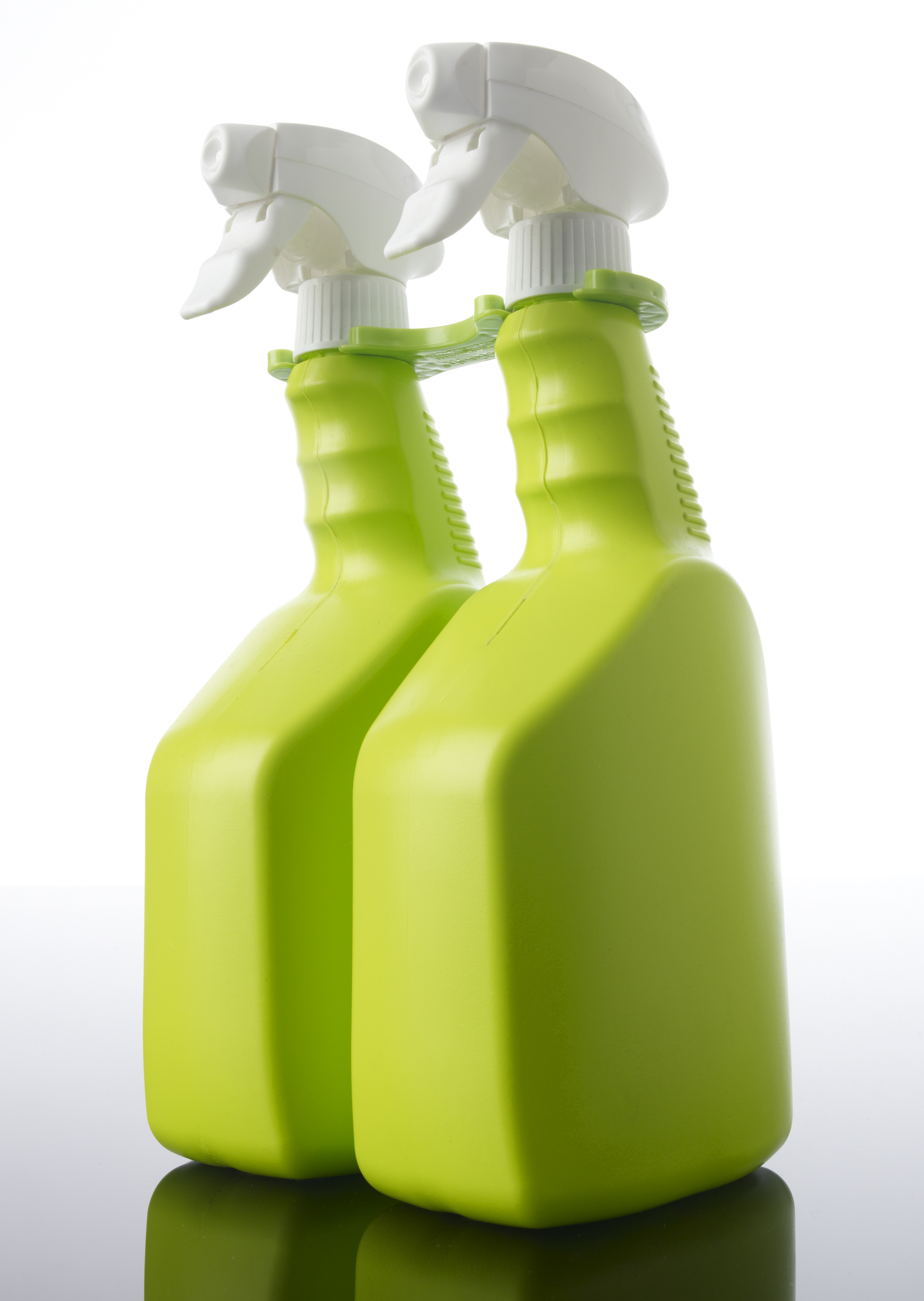
Clip used to join two spray bottles and to provide a handle

== Bags ==
Many types of bags have handles to assist in carrying them. Paper, fabric, and plastic shopping bags frequently have handes to assist shoppers carry difficult loads. Large bulk bags can have lifting straps or hand-holds to allow people or equipment to lift or stabilize the load.

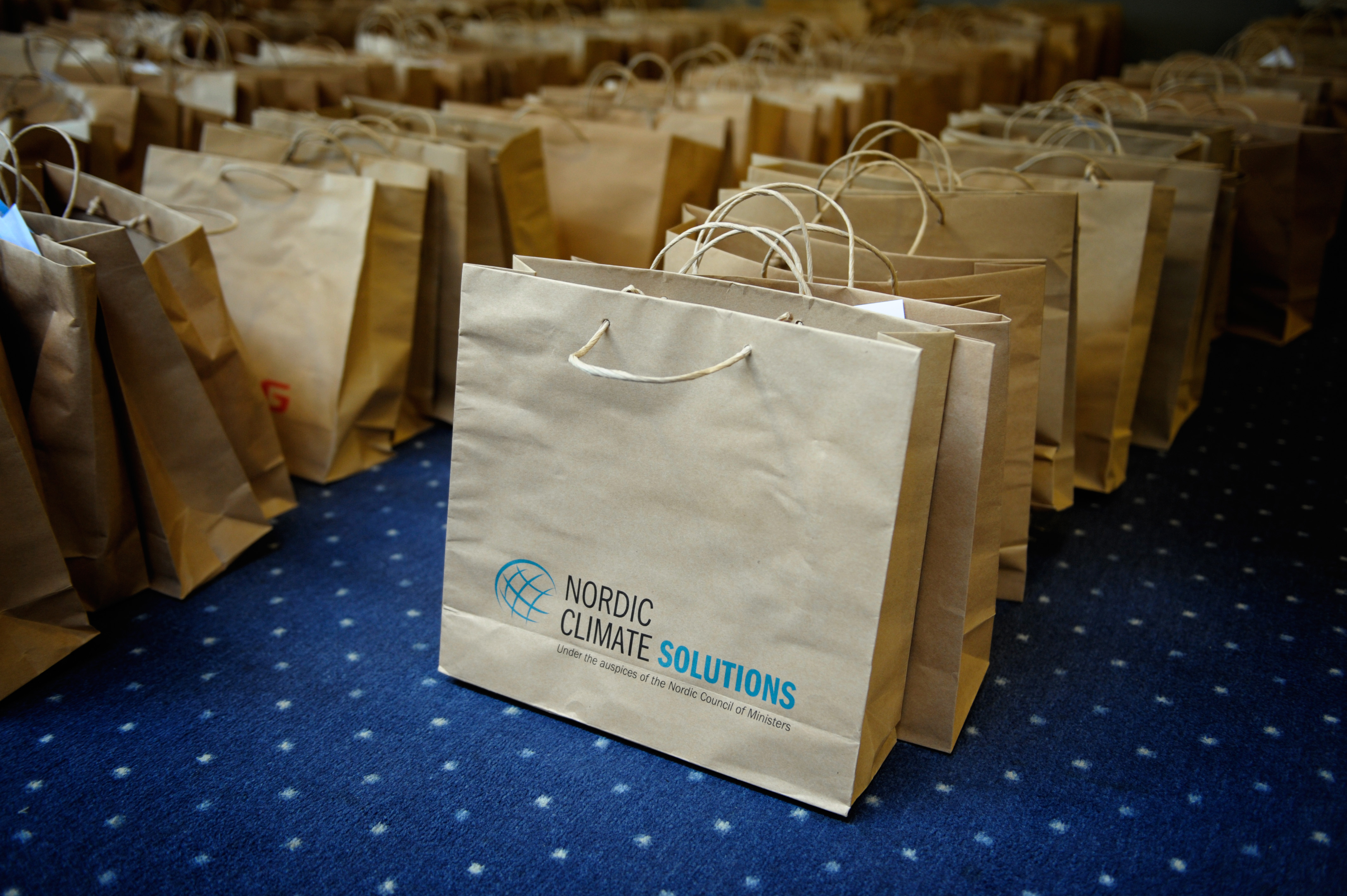
Kraft paper bags with handles

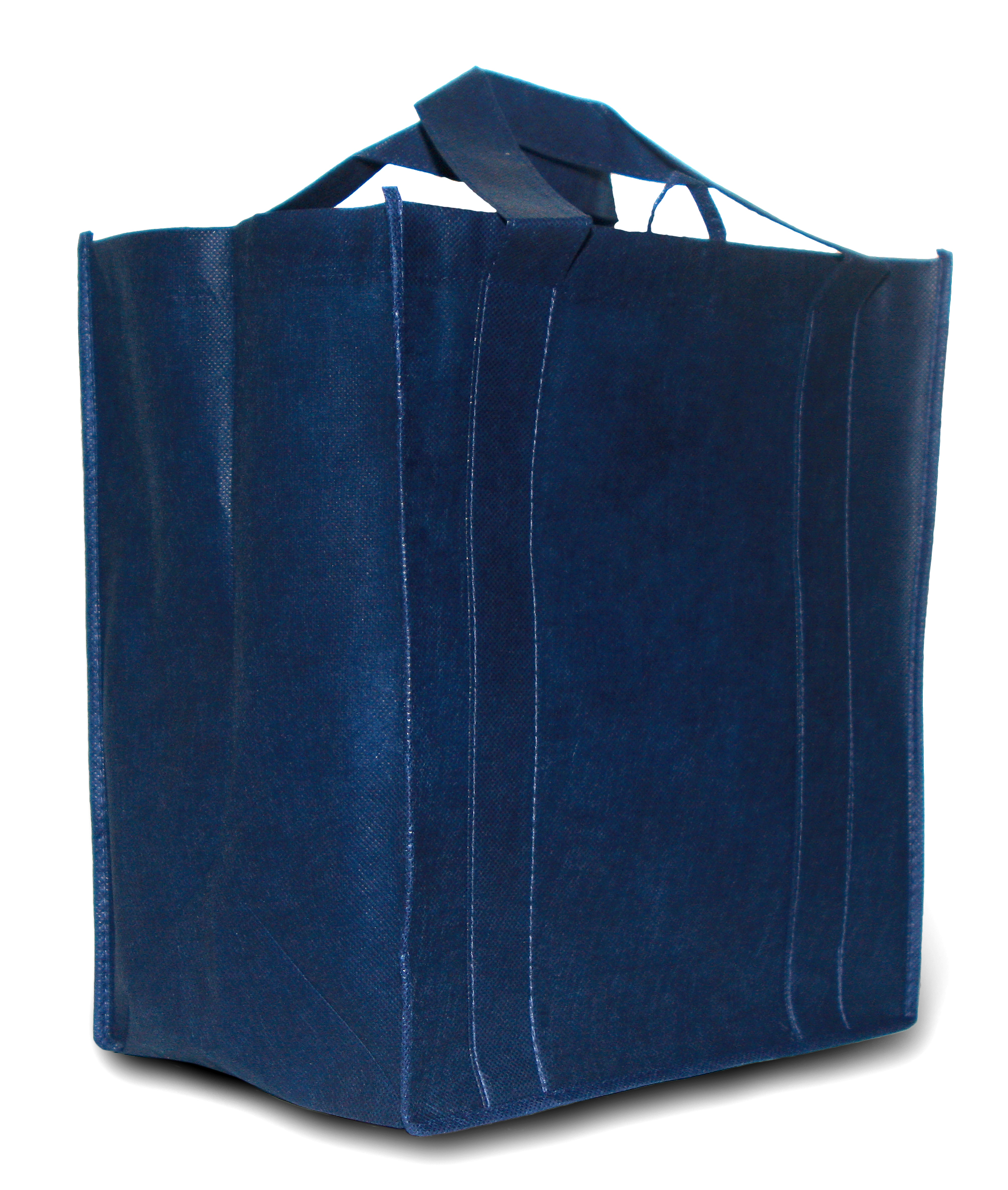
A blue reusable shopping bag

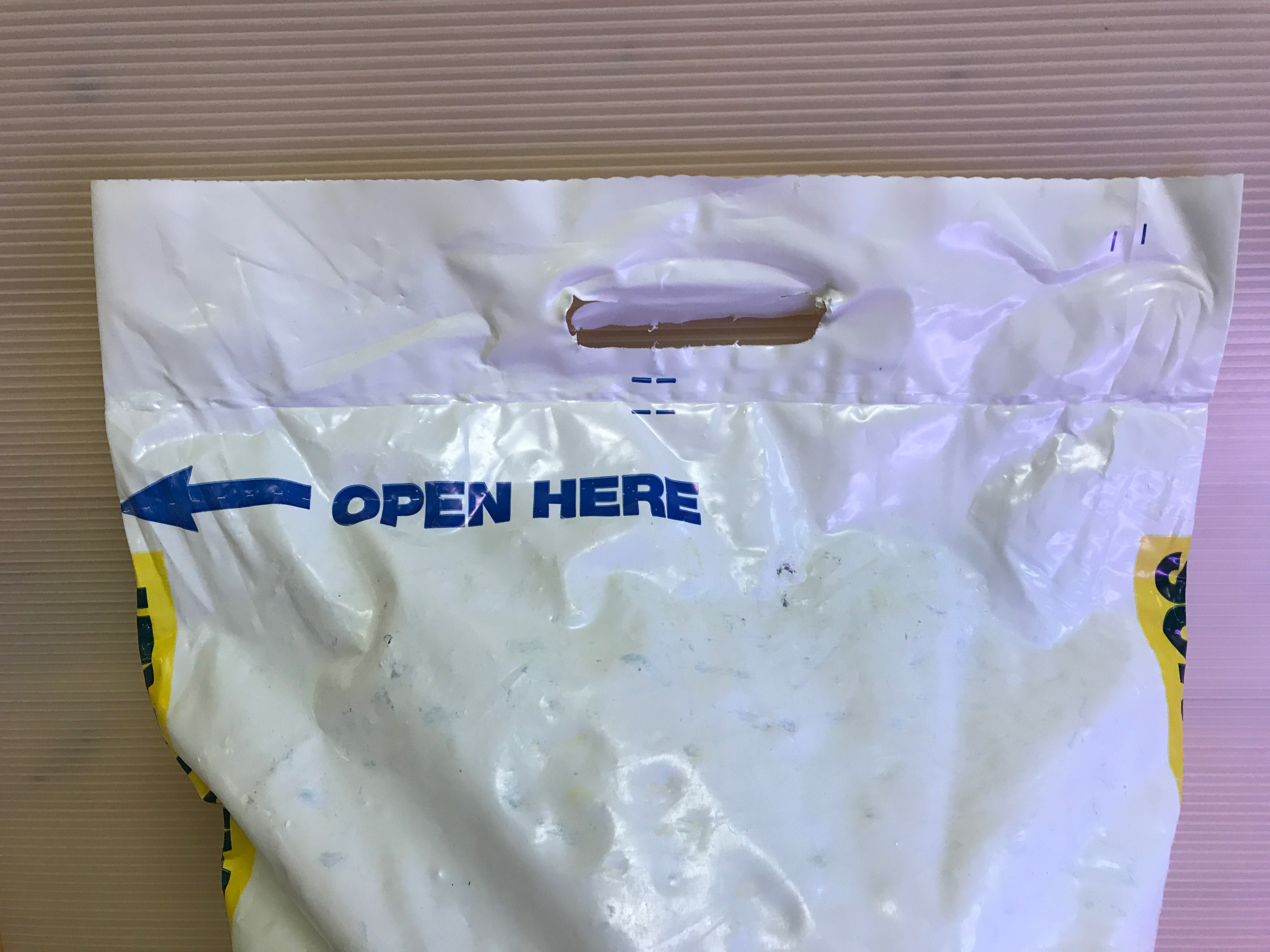
Plastic bag of water softener salt; handle die-cut through the thick plastic to allow carrying

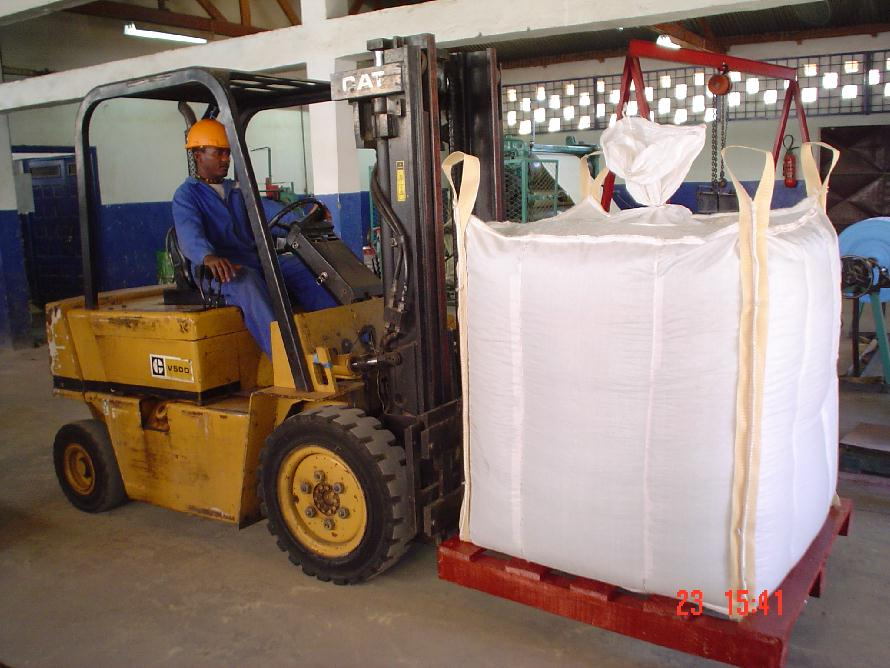
FIBC: bulk bag with lifting straps

== Multi-packs of beverage containers ==
Shrink wrapped Multi-packs often have open ends (bulls eyes) which can be used as handles. Methods are available to reinforce the film, if needed. Handles are often used on beverage carriers.

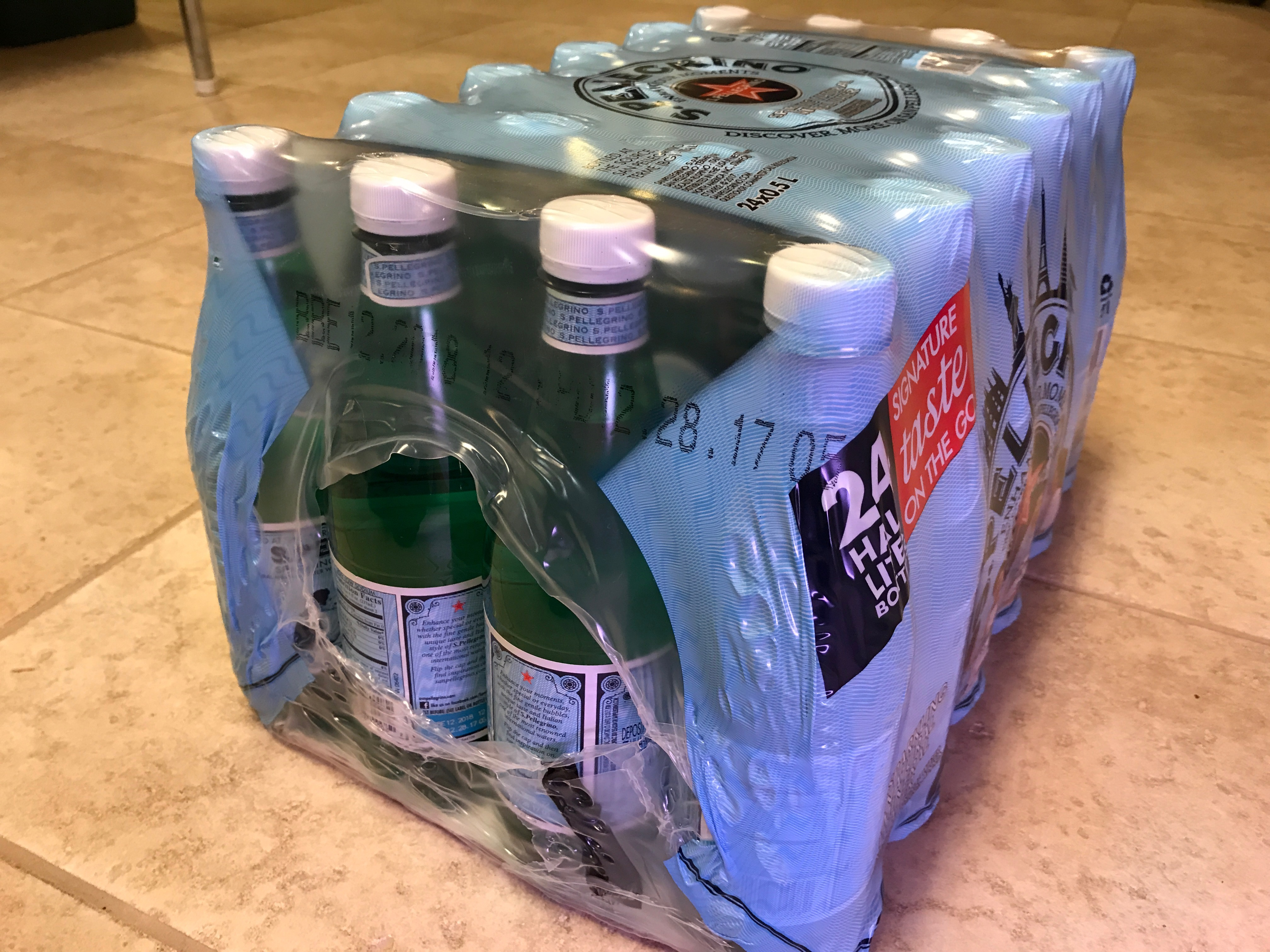
Shrink wrapped pack of bottles with ends (bulls eyes) as handles

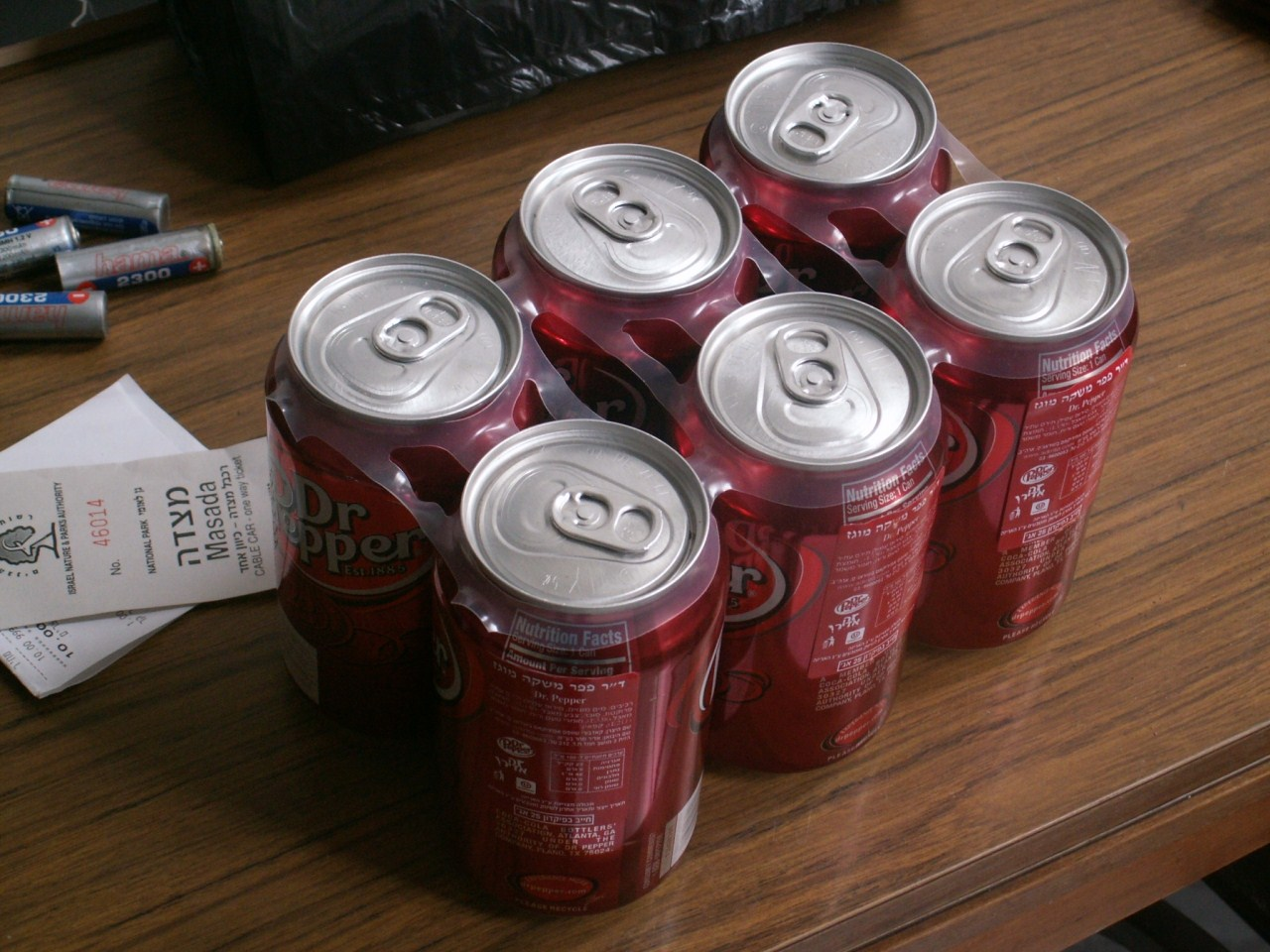
Six-pack rings for beverage cans

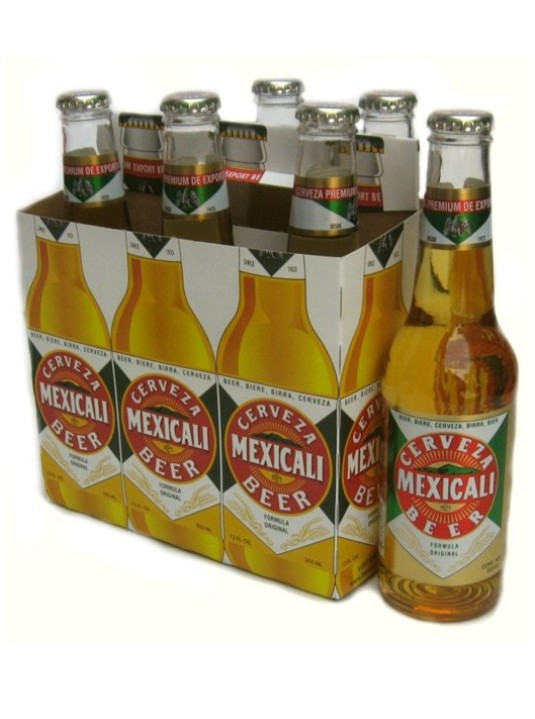
Paperboard basket

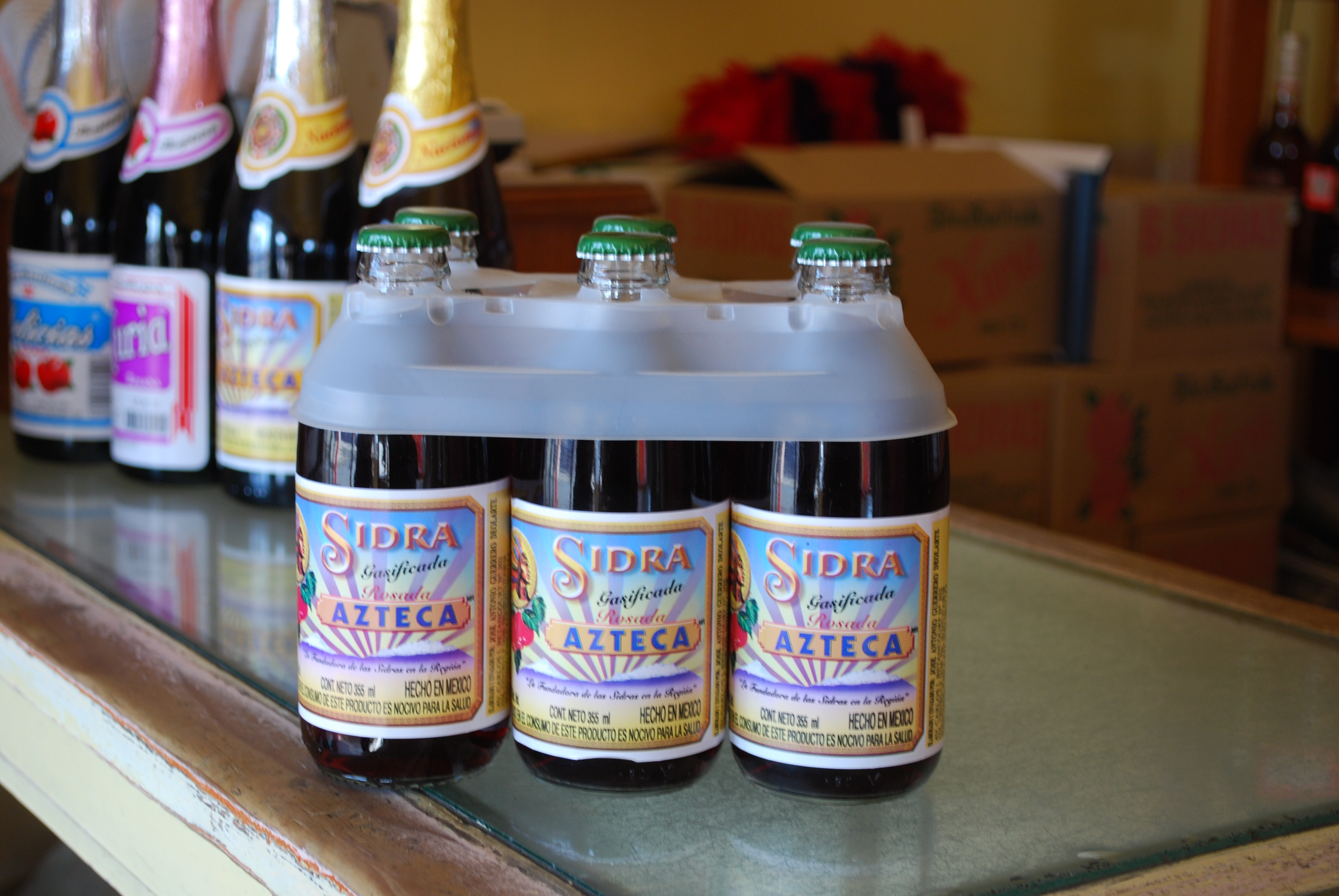
Plastic six-pack carrier

== Tape handle ==
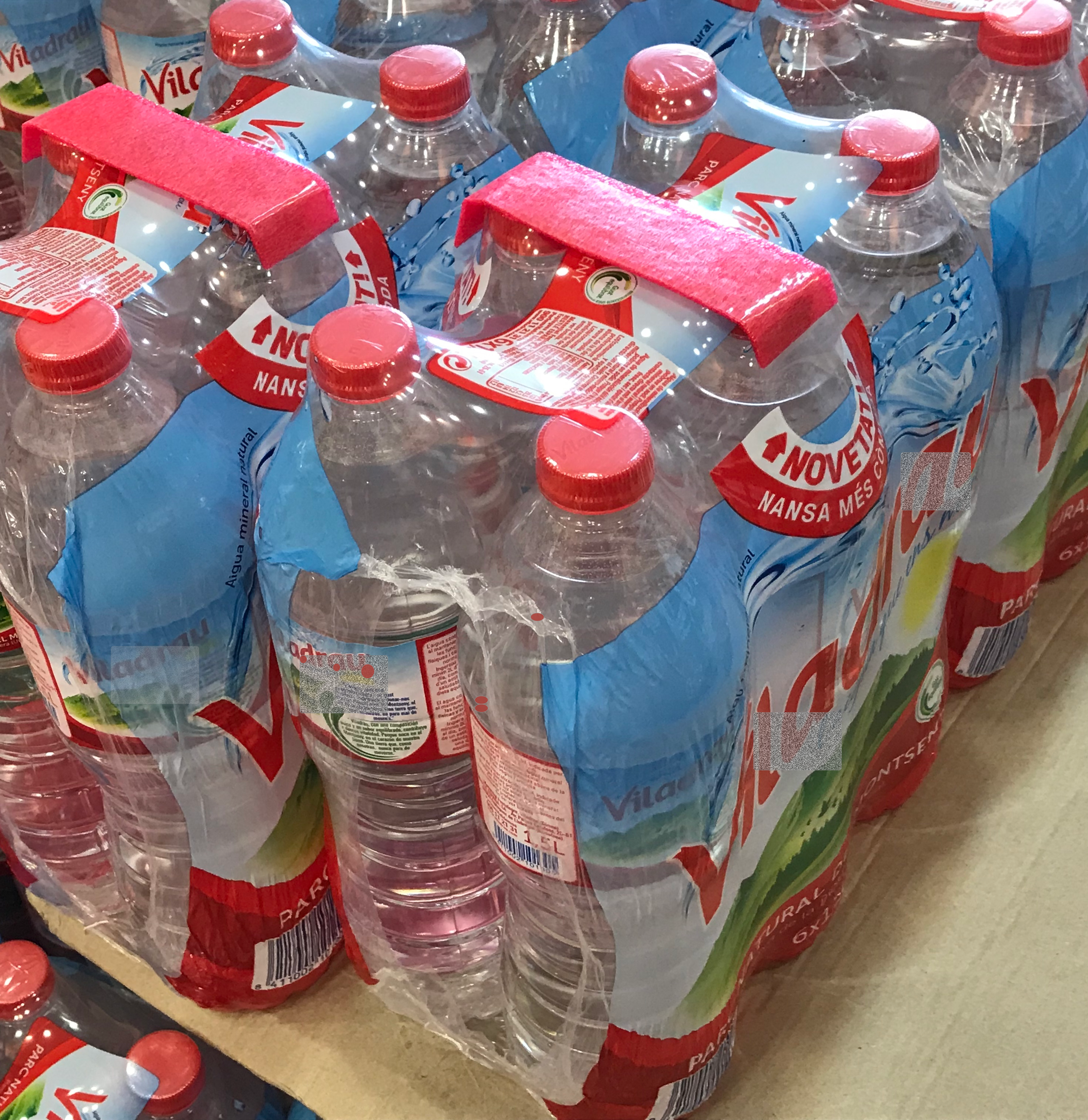
Six 1.5 L water bottles with tape handle. Transparent tape and red foam applied to flat shrink film prior to application to bottles. Subsequent shrinking tightens film and raises handle.

Pressure sensitive tape is often used as a handle: filament tape or heavy-duty plastic film backed tapes (polypropylene or polyester). A loop can be applied over a package with paper or film used to cover the adhesive in the center portion.

Another example with a shrink film package is for a tape to be applied to a film with slits cut in the film on either side of the tape. When the film shrinks, the tape does not and a handle is formed. More common ( shown in photo) is for a tape strip with center portion matted out to be applied to shrink film prior to wrapping items. Again, the film shrinks but the tape does not, raising the matted out portion.

PSA tape handles can be built into a box or bag structure or can also be added after package completion. Specialized application machinery is sometimes available.

== Bail handle ==
A bail handle consists of an open loop with ends attached to the item or package, sometimes to fixed mounts or ears. Several designs are available: bails are typically made of metal (wire) or plastic. It is a type of package handle which may be used for carrying or hanging items such as cans, pails, or jars.

== Testing ==
Several package testing options are available to packaging engineers to help determine the suitability of package handles.

People can be used directly in an evaluation. Several different people can carry (and even abuse) handle and package options for subjective ratings. These can be compiled in a report.

More objective laboratory procedures are also used. Fixtured hands of various designs are used to hold a handle (sometimes two handles for a box). ASTM International D6804, Standard Guide for Hand Hole Design in Corrugated Boxes, describes "jerk testing" by modified drop test procedures or use of the constant pull rates of a Universal testing machine. ASTM F852, Specification for Portable Gasoline, Kerosene, and Diesel Containers for Consumer Use, requires severe "jerk testing" of the handle. These test procedures are also used on other types of packages. Other test procedures are conducted with a static force by hanging a heavily loaded package for an extended time or even using a centrifuge.

== See also ==
- Lug (knob)
