= Builders hardware =

Metal hardware used in buildings

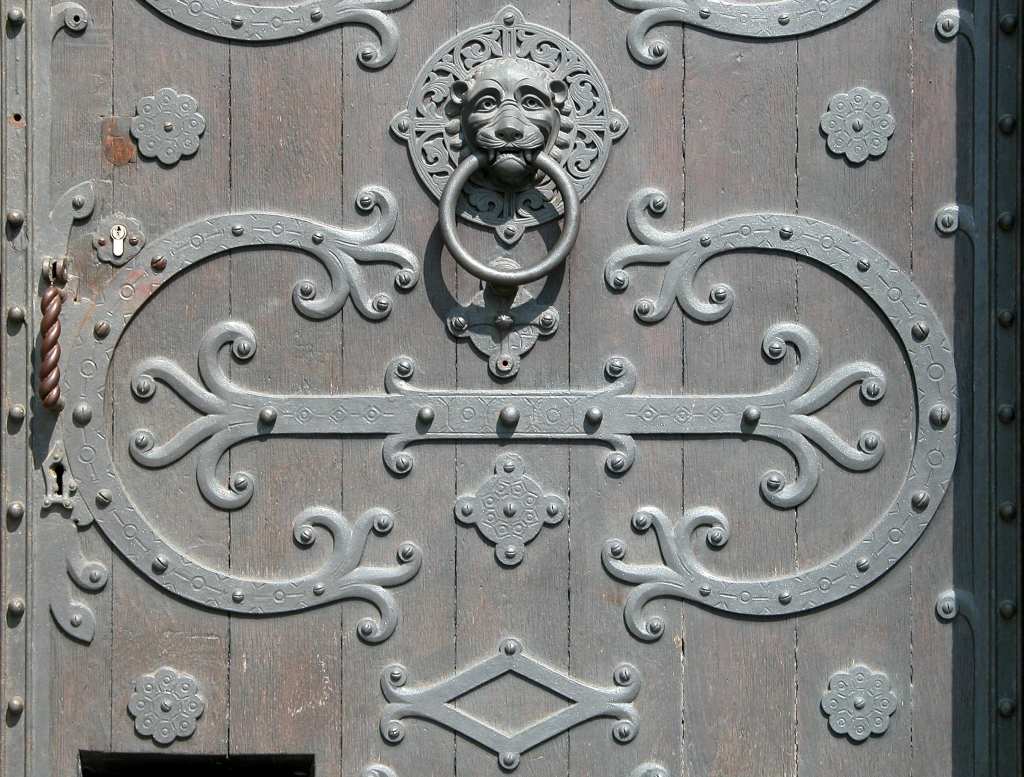
Decorations on a door of Dankwarderode Castle, Braunschweig, Germany (2008)

Builders' hardware or just builders hardware is a group of metal hardware specifically used for protection, decoration, and convenience in buildings. Building products do not make any part of a building, rather they support them and make them work. It usually supports fixtures like windows, doors, and cabinets. Common examples include door handles, door hinges, deadbolts, latches, numerals, letter plates, switch plates, and door knockers.

Builders hardware is commonly available in brass, steel, aluminium, stainless steel, and iron.

Well known suppliers of builders hardware mainly exist in China, India, Mexico and some in the U.S.

== Classifications ==
While builders hardware is classified by supplying at least one of the three attributes listed above, it is usually broken down by where it is used, or by usage.

=== Bathroom hardware ===
Bathroom hardware includes the products that are used in constructing and maintaining the bathroom appearance and decoration. Bathroom products includes faucets, showers, holders, tubs, shelves, mirrors etc.

=== Door hardware ===
All those products that are used either in door decoration, maintenance, or in any other function come under door hardware, such as door handles, fasteners, hinges, hooks, number plates, knockers, door eyes etc.

=== Furniture hardware ===
Furniture hardware are those products that are used to support the furniture look, design and durability. Furniture hardware products include furniture frames, furniture legs, furniture arms, etc.

=== Safety and security hardware ===
Buildings, goods and their occupants needs protection from fire, intruders, and other external agents. Proper protection systems include fire safe security system, home monitoring, smoke detectors, locksets, window guards, etc.

=== Plumbing hardware ===
Plumbing hardware products are used for supplying water throughout the building using hose, pipes and tubes. These hardware products ensure that water is supplied properly and continuously. Since water runs or remains all the time in these products, it is needed that the materials with which these products are highly corrosion resistant and can withstand extreme temperatures. The most common materials are copper, aluminum, steel and PVC.

=== Cabinet hardware ===
The products that are used to make cabinets working come under cabinet hardware like cabinet fasteners, brackets, latches, hinges, pulls, locks, etc. Cabinet hardware are small components that make cabinets functional. These products are made of materials like plastics, metals and may be glasses.

=== Window hardware ===
Window hardware does not include window itself rather they are smaller components that are used to install, fix and protect windows, such as window extrusions, fasteners, handles, hinges, locks and many more.

=== Curtain hardware ===
Curtain hardware includes products like hooks, curtain rings, curtain finials, etc. These products are used to hang curtain at doors, windows, verandas, etc. Curtain hooks and poles are used to handle and move the curtains. Curtain hardware products are made of varieties of materials including metals and plastics. Mostly aluminum and iron are used for making rings, hooks, rods and poles.

== See also ==
- Architectural ironmongery

== Bibliography ==
- Towne, Henry Robinson (1904), Locks and builders hardware: a hand book for architects, J. Wiley & sons, ISBN 9781231158838.
