= Door furniture =

Items attached to a door or drawer to enhance functionality or appearance

Door furniture (British and Australian English) or door hardware (North American English) refers to any of the items that are attached to a door or a drawer to enhance its functionality or appearance.

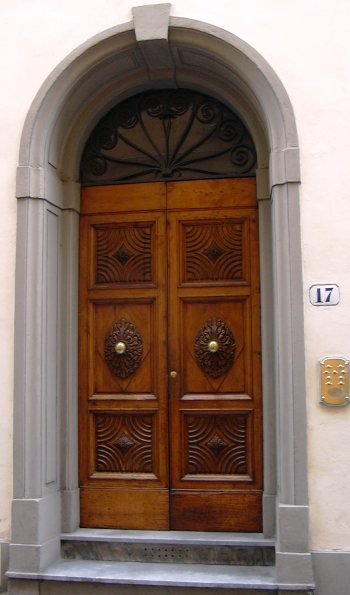
Decorative door in Florence, Italy

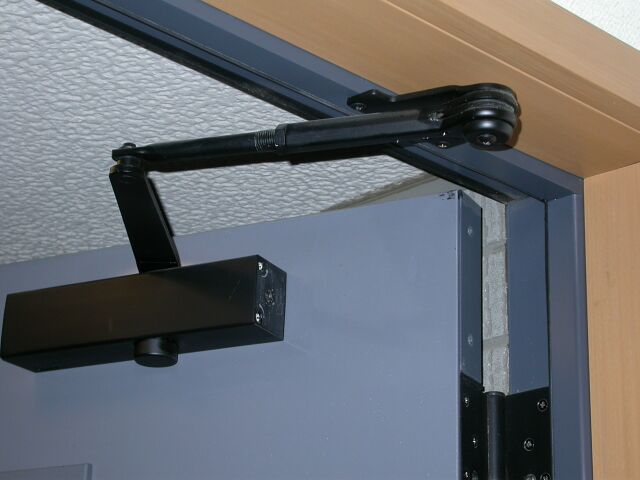
Manual door closer

Design of door furniture is an issue to disabled persons who might have difficulty opening or using some kinds of door, and to specialists in interior design as well as those usability professionals which often take their didactic examples from door furniture design and use.

Items of door furniture fall into several categories, described below.

== Hinges ==
A hinge is a component that attaches one edge of a door to the frame, while allowing the other edge to swing from it. It usually consists of a pair of plates, each with a set of open cylindrical rings (the knuckles) attached to them. The knuckles of the two plates are offset from each other and mesh together. A hinge pin is then placed through the two sets of knuckles and usually fixed, to combine the plates and make the hinge a single unit. One door usually has about three hinges, but it can vary.

== Handles ==
Doors generally have at least one fixed handle, usually accompanied with a latch (see below). A typical "handle set" is composed of the exterior handle, escutcheon, an independent deadbolt, and the interior package (knob or lever). On some doors the latch is incorporated into a hinged handle that releases when pulled on.

See also:

- Doorknob – A knob or lever on an axle that is rotated to release the bolt;
- Crash bar or Panic bar;
- Flush pull handle for sliding glass door.

== Locks ==
A lock is a device that prevents access by those without a key or combination, generally by preventing one or more latches from being operated. Often accompanied by an escutcheon. Some doors, particularly older ones, will have a keyhole accompanying the lock.

== Fasteners ==
Opening a captured draw bolt-style latch

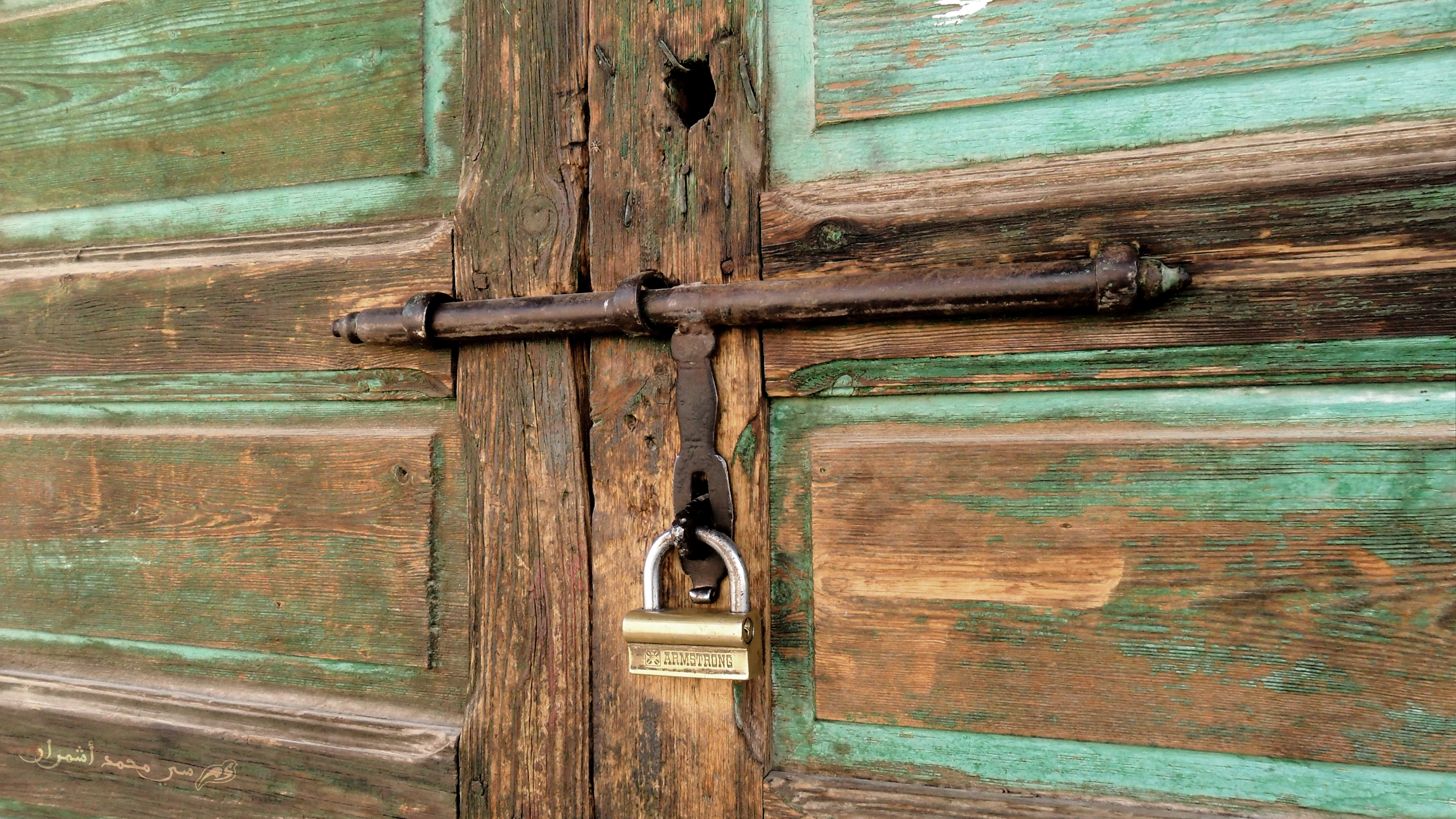
An aldrop, a form of draw bolt latch allowing it to be locked

Functionally, all but swinging doors use some form of fastener to hold them closed. Typical forms of fasteners include:

- Latch – A device that allows one to fasten a door from one side (but, if designed to, open from either).
- Bolt – A (nearly always) metal shaft attached by cleats or a specific form of bracket, that slides into the jamb to fasten a door.
  - Draw bolt – A form of crossbar latch where a bolt, held in place by metal bails, is slid to engage a bail fixed to a jamb or mating door. A small, typically knob, handle is affixed to the bolt to aid grip. An Aldrop is similar, but incorporates a slot through the handle which can engage a hasp for securing the bolt with a lock.
  - Latch bolt – A bolt that has an angled surface that acts as a wedge to push the bolt in while the door is being closed. By the use of a latch bolt, a door can be closed without having to operate the handle.
  - Deadbolt – Deadbolts usually extend deeper into the frame and are not automatically retractable the way latch bolts are. They are typically manipulated with a lock on the outside and either a lock or a latch on the inside. Deadbolts are generally used for security purposes on external doors in case somebody tries to force the door in or use tools such as a crowbar, hammer, screwdriver, etc.

=== Fastener accessories ===
- Strike plate – A plate with a hole in the middle made to receive a bolt. If the strike is for a latch bolt, it typically also includes a small ramped area to help the bolt move inward while the door is being closed. (Also known as just "strike") It's also available as electric strike which allows you to open the door even though the mechanical lock is locked.
- Dust socket – A metal or plastic socket that sits behind the Strike plate concealing the rough wood of the mortise.

== Accessories ==
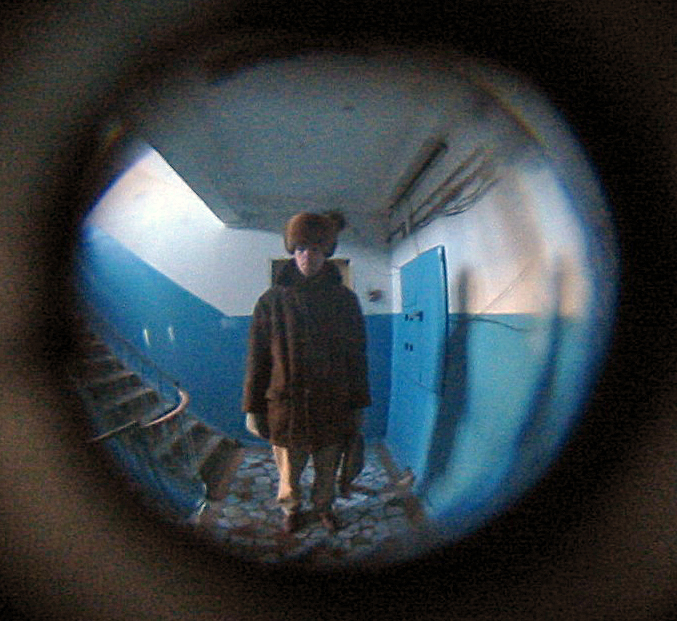
A typical peephole in a door, allowing the person to see who is outside the door without opening it.

Numerous devices exist to serve specific purposes related to how a door should (or should not) be used. See:

- Door chain – A device to secure door opening
- Door closer – Mechanical or electromagnetic device to close an open door (in the event of a fire)
- Door opener – Automatic door opening device activated by motion sensors or pressure pads
- Door damper – A hydraulic device employed to slow the door's closure
- Door knocker
- Door stop – used to prevent the door from opening too far or striking another object
- Espagnolette (for a window)
- Fingerplate
- Letter box or mail slot
- Peephole
- Kickplate

A number of items normally accompany doors but are not necessarily mounted on the door itself, such as doorbells.

== See also ==
- Architectural ironmongery
- Drawer pull
