= Kwikset =

American lock and lockset manufacturer

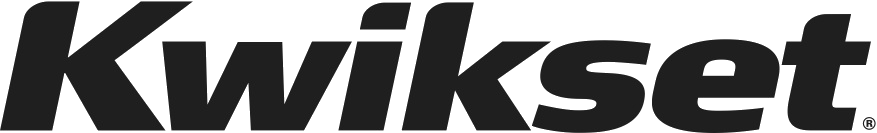

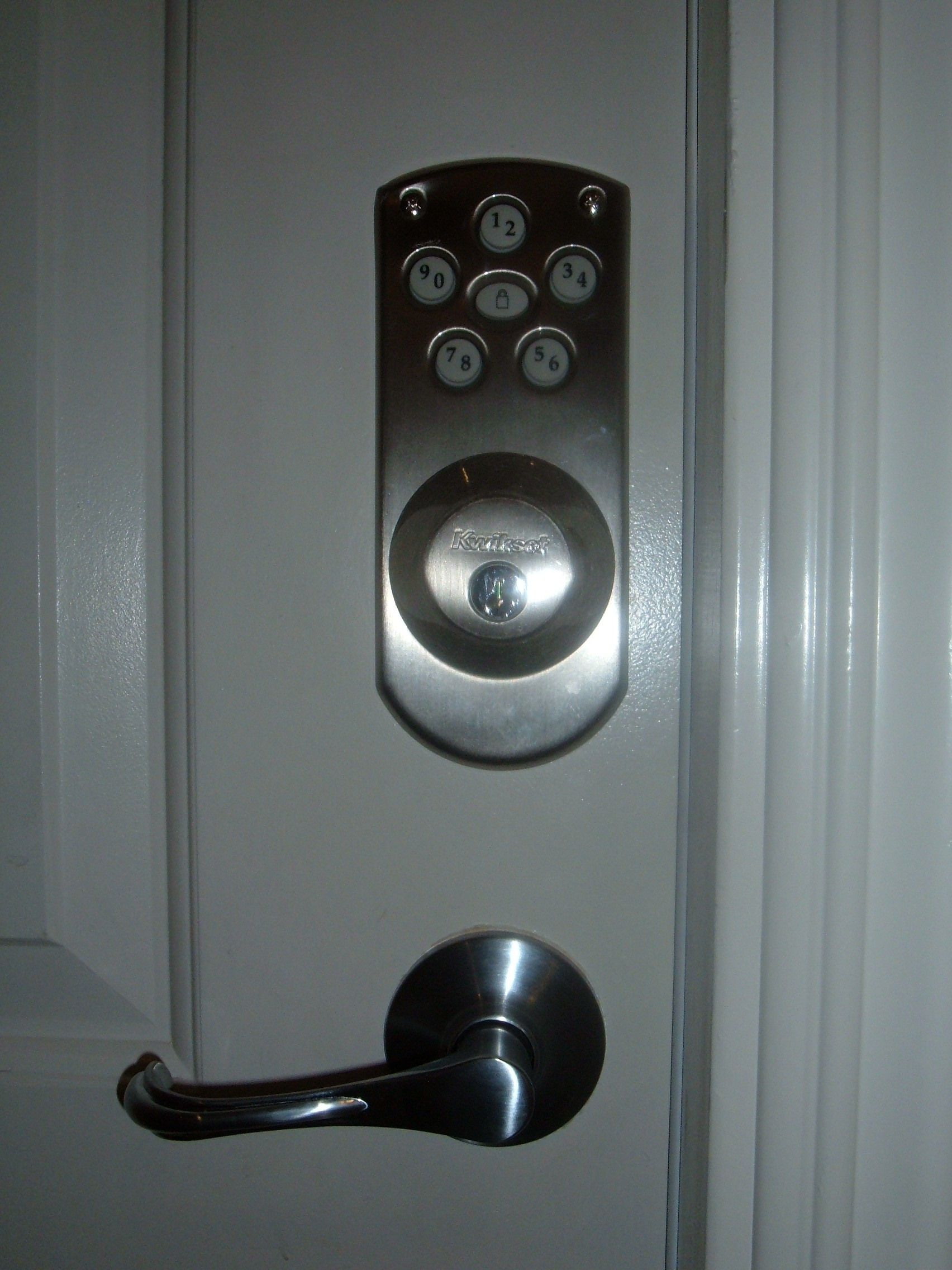
- A Kwikset electronic lock with optional operation using a conventional key. This electronic deadbolt uses a Weiser keypad and is a hybrid combining features of Kwikset and Weiser brand locks.
- Company type: Subsidiary
- Founded: 1946; 80 years ago
- Founders: Adolf Schoepe; Karl Rhinehart
- Headquarters: Lake Forest, California, US
- Parent: Assa Abloy
- Website: kwikset.com

Kwikset is an American lock and lockset manufacturer owned by Assa Abloy. Originally Gateway Manufacturing Company, Kwikset was founded in California in 1946 by Adolf Schoepe, and Karl Rhinehart.

The current name for the company was derived from the company's first locks, which pioneered the then-revolutionary tubular lock design, which was relatively fast to install. Kwikset key blanks (KW1, Ilco 1176, Axxess 66) are available at almost every location where keys can be made.

Kwikset currently has manufacturing facilities in Denison, Texas; Charlotte, North Carolina; and Mexicali, Mexico. Kwikset also has a facility in China. Kwikset previously had manufacturing facilities in Anaheim, California; Bristow, Oklahoma; and Waynesboro, Georgia; but starting in 1996, these facilities were closed in a consolidation of operations to the Mexicali facility. Kwikset's Corporate headquarters is in Lake Forest, California.

== History ==
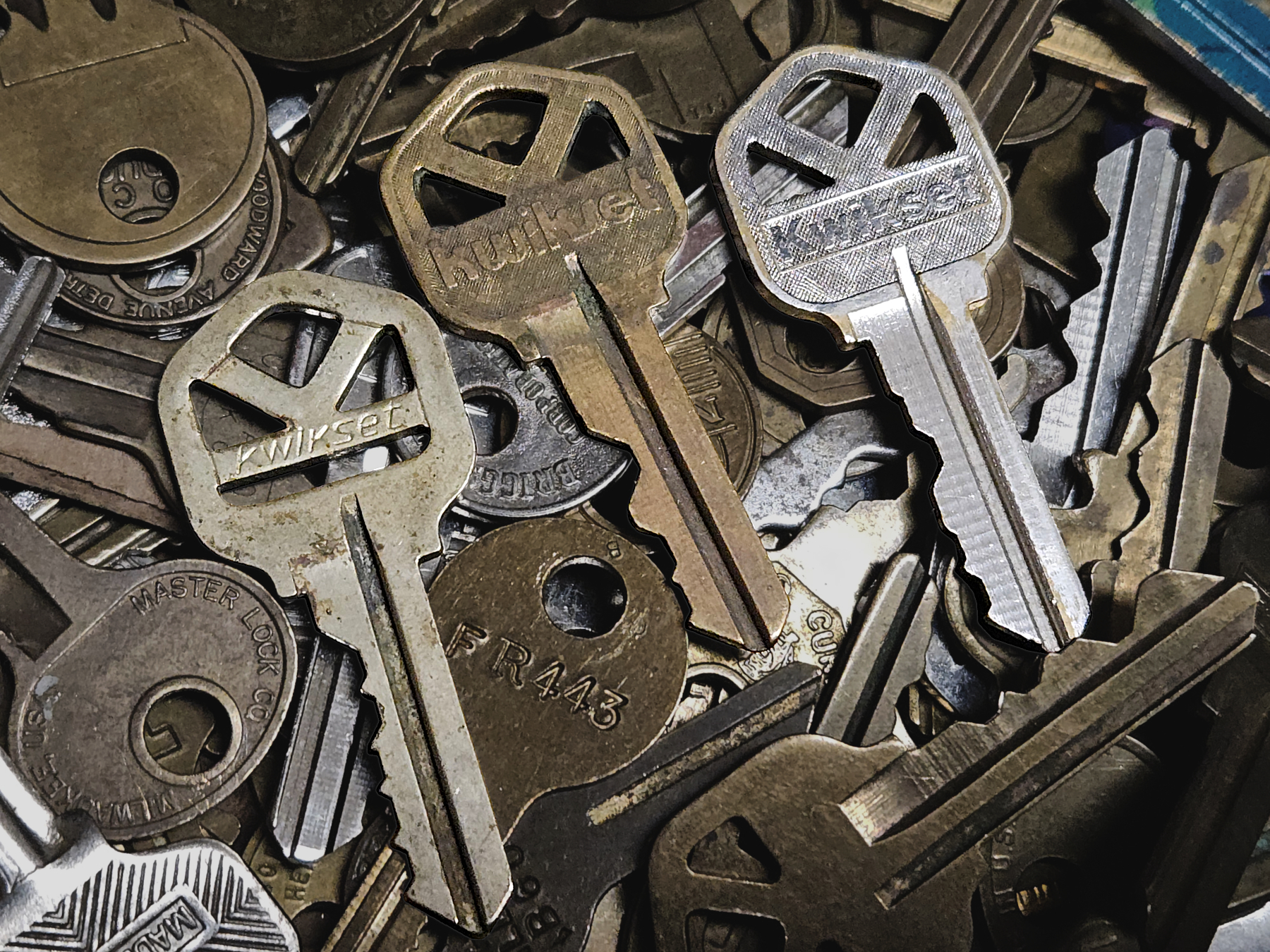
Design variations of KW1 key

Adolph Schoepe and friend Karl Rhinehart founded Gateway Manufacturing Company in South Gate just before the end of World War II. They manufactured locks under the Kwikset brand. They moved the company to Anaheim in 1948. During the Korean War, demand plummeted, but the company took a risk, producing more goods than they could sell. When demand surged after the war, their ability to supply goods from the earlier manufactured stock cemented a position as the largest United States supplier of locks.

Rhinehart retired in 1952. Schoepe sold the company in 1957, to American Hardware Corporation. They merged with Emhart Manufacturing Corporation in 1964. Black & Decker purchased the company in 1989.

In 1992, Kwikset introduced its higher quality, high-security Titan product line. Around the year 2005, the line was rebranded as the "Signature Series".

In March 2010, Black & Decker was purchased by Stanley Tools. Kwikset subsequently became part of the Hardware and Home Improvement (HHI) Group of Stanley Black & Decker, which also owned lockset manufacturers Weiser and Baldwin. Kwikset evolved to include many Weiser features, and Weiser locks now use Kwikset's "SmartKey" self-rekeyable lock technology and Kwikset keyways.

On October 9, 2012, the Wall Street Journal reported that Spectrum Brands Holdings, Inc. had agreed to acquire the HHI division from Stanley Black & Decker's, including Kwikset, and that the transaction was slated to close by December 31, 2012.

On September 8, 2021, Assa Abloy announced that it had signed a definitive agreement to acquire Spectrum Brands' HHI division, including Kwikset, among other brands, for a purchase price of $4.3 billion. The transaction was initially expected to close in the fourth quarter of 2021. On June 20, 2023, the purchase of the "HHI" division of Spectrum Brands was completed, this included the Kwikset brand.
