= Schlage (surname) =

Schlage is a surname. Notable people with the surname include:

- Walter Schlage (1882–1946), German-born American engineer and inventor
- Willi Schlage (1888–1940), German chess master
