= Ballcock =

Mechanism for filling water tanks

A ballcock (also balltap or float valve) is a mechanism or machine for filling water tanks, such as those found in flush toilets, while avoiding overflow and (in the event of low water pressure) backflow. The modern ballcock was invented by José Antonio de Alzate y Ramírez, a Mexican priest and scientist, who described the device in 1790 in the Gaceta de Literatura Méxicana. The ballcock device was patented in 1797 for use in steam engines by Edmund Cartwright.

In its most basic form the ballcock consists of a valve connected to a hollow, sealed float by means of a lever mounted near the top of the tank. The float is often ball-shaped, hence the name ballcock. The valve is connected to the incoming water supply, and is opened and closed by the lever which has the float mounted on the end. When the water level rises, the float rises with it; once it rises to a pre-set level, the lever mechanism forces the valve closed and shuts off the water flow. This is an example of negative feedback and of proportional control.

An alternative to the traditional ballcock is the float cup, pioneered in 1957 by the Fluidmaster founder Adolf Schoepe, which is integrated with the tank's fill valve and so consumes less space. A later innovation, the floatless fill valve, designed for low-profile, low-flow toilet tanks, uses a pressure-sensing diaphragm mechanism instead of a float to control the inlet valve. Delay valves, which delay the filling until the level has dropped to a low level, avert short-cycling of the water supply.

A diagram representing a water tank with a ballcock in closed and open states
Parts of the ballcock (Portsmouth type): 1. Float, 2. Lever arm, 3. Pivot, 4. Piston, 5. Piston washer, 6. Valve seat, 7. Water supply inlet
A water tank with a ballcock in the closed position	A water tank with a ballcock in the open position
With the water at the normal fill level, the vertical buoyancy force applied to the float is transferred via the lever arm, which rotates about the pivot to apply a horizontal force to the piston, pressing the piston washer against the valve seat and closing the water supply.	As the water level falls, the float falls with the water and, as the lever arm rotates about the pivot, the piston and washer are moved away from the valve seat, allowing water to enter from the inlet. The float rises with the water level until it reaches the fill level and the valve is closed again by the piston washer being pressed against the valve seat.

== Common types of ballcock ==
=== Piston valves ===
A cross section through a ballcock of the 'Portsmouth' piston type. Buoyancy force on the float (1) is transferred by the float arm (2, shortened in this diagram) about the pivot (3) to the piston (4), pressing the washer (5) against the valve seat (6) and preventing water entering from the inlet (7).

The oldest form of ballcock uses a lever connected to a float to move a piston within the valve, pressing a washer against the water inlet to close the valve at the required water level. When the water level falls, the float falls with it, and the lever arm slides the piston away from the water inlet, allowing water to pass through the valve until the float rises to the required water level again.

These valves require either a large float or, more usually, a long float arm to provide sufficient force against the valve's washer to close the water inlet against water under pressure.

=== Diaphragm valves ===
A cross section through a diaphragm type ballcock. Buoyancy force acting on the float (1) rotates the float arm (2, shortened in this diagram) about the pivot (3), pressing against the plunger pin (4), which presses a flexible diaphragm (5) against the valve seat (6), preventing water passing from the inlet (7) to the outlet (8).

Diaphragm valve ballcocks contain a flexible diaphragm inside the body of the ballcock, which is pressed against the water inlet by a moving plunger or pin. The plunger is held against the diaphragm by the lever arm connected to the float, but when the water level falls the lever arm rotates away from the plunger, allowing water pressure at the inlet to move the diaphragm and open the valve. As the float rises, the float arm presses against the plunger, which forces the diaphragm to move back against the inlet, sealing the valve.

These ballcocks also require a long float arm to provide sufficient force to hold the diaphragm tightly against the water inlet.

Some ballcocks of this type have an adjustable screw between the float arm and the pin, to allow the water level to be adjusted by changing the angle of the float arm in the valve's closed state.

=== Equilibrium valves ===
Equilibrium float valves do not rely on mechanical force from the float to close the water inlet, but instead use water pressure to create imbalanced forces which hold a diaphragm against the outlet or inlet, with the float used to control the pressure applied to one side of the diaphragm.

These valves typically use the float to open and close a small aperture in a secondary chamber of the valve, which requires very little force to seal. This permits equilibrium float valves to have much smaller floats with short float arms, making them much more compact. They are very common in WC cisterns, where space is restricted.

An example of an equilibrium float valve
Parts of the valve: 1. Float, 2. Lever arm, 3. Pivot, 4. Washer, 5. Pressure relief orifice, 6. Diaphragm, 7. Pilot hole in diaphragm, 8. Inlet, 9. Outlet
A closed equilibrium float valve	An open equilibrium float valve
Closed: buoyancy pushing up on the float rotates the lever arm, pressing a washer against the pressure relief orifice. This maintains a balanced water pressure either side of the diaphragm as water is able to flow from the inlet through the pilot hole in the diaphragm. Since the outlet is at atmospheric pressure, a greater surface area of the diaphragm on the 'b' side of the diaphragm is subject to water pressure, so the force on that side is greater than the force on the 'a' side, forcing the diaphragm against the outlet and sealing the valve.	Open: as the water level falls, the float descends and rotates the lever arm, removing the washer from the pressure relief orifice. Water flows out of the orifice faster than it can flow through the pilot hole in the diaphragm, and the pressure on the 'b' side of the diaphragm falls. The force from the inlet water pressure on the 'a' side of the diaphragm is now greater than the force on the 'b' side, forcing the diaphragm away from the outlet and opening the valve.

An example of a moving pin equilibrium float valve
Parts of the valve: 1. Float, 2. Float lever, 3. Pivot, 4. Shaped pin, 5. Diaphragm, 6. Pilot hole in diaphragm, 7. Inlet, 8. Outlet
An equilibrium float flave in the closed state	An example of an equilibrium float valve being activated	An example of an equilibrium float valve in its open state
When the float (1) is raised to normal water level, the float arm (2) is rotated about the pivot (3) and pushes the shaped pin (4) through the diaphragm (6) into the body of the valve. The shape of the pin and diaphragm allow a small flow of water to pass from the inlet to the secondary chamber (b), balancing the pressure and forcing the diaphragm against the inlet.	When the water level fall, the float descends and the lever arm rotates, pulling the shaped pin upwards. The shaping of the pin now prevents water from flowing from the inlet to the secondary chamber, but allows water to flow up out of the secondary chamber and out of the valve, causing the pressure in the chamber to be reduced.	With the pressure in the secondary chamber now less than the pressure on the 'a' side of the diaphragm, the diaphragm is forced away from the inlet by the supply water pressure, opening the valve.
