= Bored cylindrical lock =

Type of lock

A bored cylindrical lock is a lockset which is installed by boring two circular holes in the door. Door handles may also use the same installation.

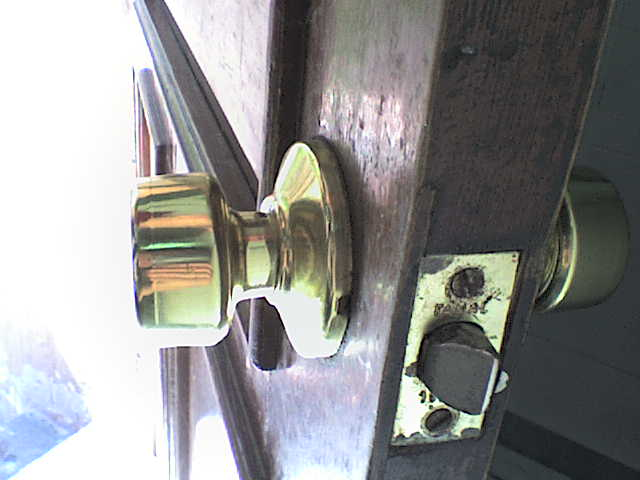

== Installation ==
Typical preparation required for installation of a bored cylindrical lockset.

Two holes are bored, perpendicular to one another, into the door. The "face bore" is the larger hole which is bored into the door face and a smaller "edge bore" hole is bored into the door edge. The edge may require additional preparation to receive the latch assembly, typically by routing or chiseling a shallow mortise. Some commercially-sold doors may come prepared to receive one or more bored cylindrical locks, such as entry doors, which typically require both a door knob and dead bolt.

In the United States, typically, the face bore is sized from 1.5 to 2.125 inches (3.81 to 5.40 cm) in diameter and is centered at 2.375 or 2.75 inches (6.03 or 6.99 cm) from the leading edge of the door. This distance is referred to as the "backset." Other, less popular, backsets are at 3.75 and 5 inches (9.5 and 12.7 cm). Residential doors are normally prepared with a 2.375-inch (6.03 cm) backset and commercial doors have a 2.75-inch (7.0 cm) backset. The edge bore is typically centered on the edge.

== History ==
The modern bored cylindrical lock was invented by the German-born engineer Walter Schlage in 1923, as an innovation on a patent filed in 1920 for a lock whose installation required a face bore and surface rabbet, simplifying door preparation compared to a traditional mortise lock.

With the purpose of lowering the cost of lock installations, the cylindrical lock requires significantly less labor and materials than its predecessors. The previous standard, the mortise lock, needs a lot more wood to be removed from the door to fit its large and intricate lock body inside.

With its lower manufacturing cost and ease of installation, the cylindrical lock supplanted the mortise lock as the norm in the United States; Europe, however, did not see widespread adoption, and continues to use the mortise lock as the norm.

As a cheaper alternative, the cylindrical lock comes with fewer functions than a traditional installation; For instance, while a mortise lock can contain both a latch and deadbolt in one unit, the cylindrical lock can only have one of the two. In practice, this means that a cylindrical lock is less secure than a mortise lock unless paired with a deadbolt.

== Gallery ==
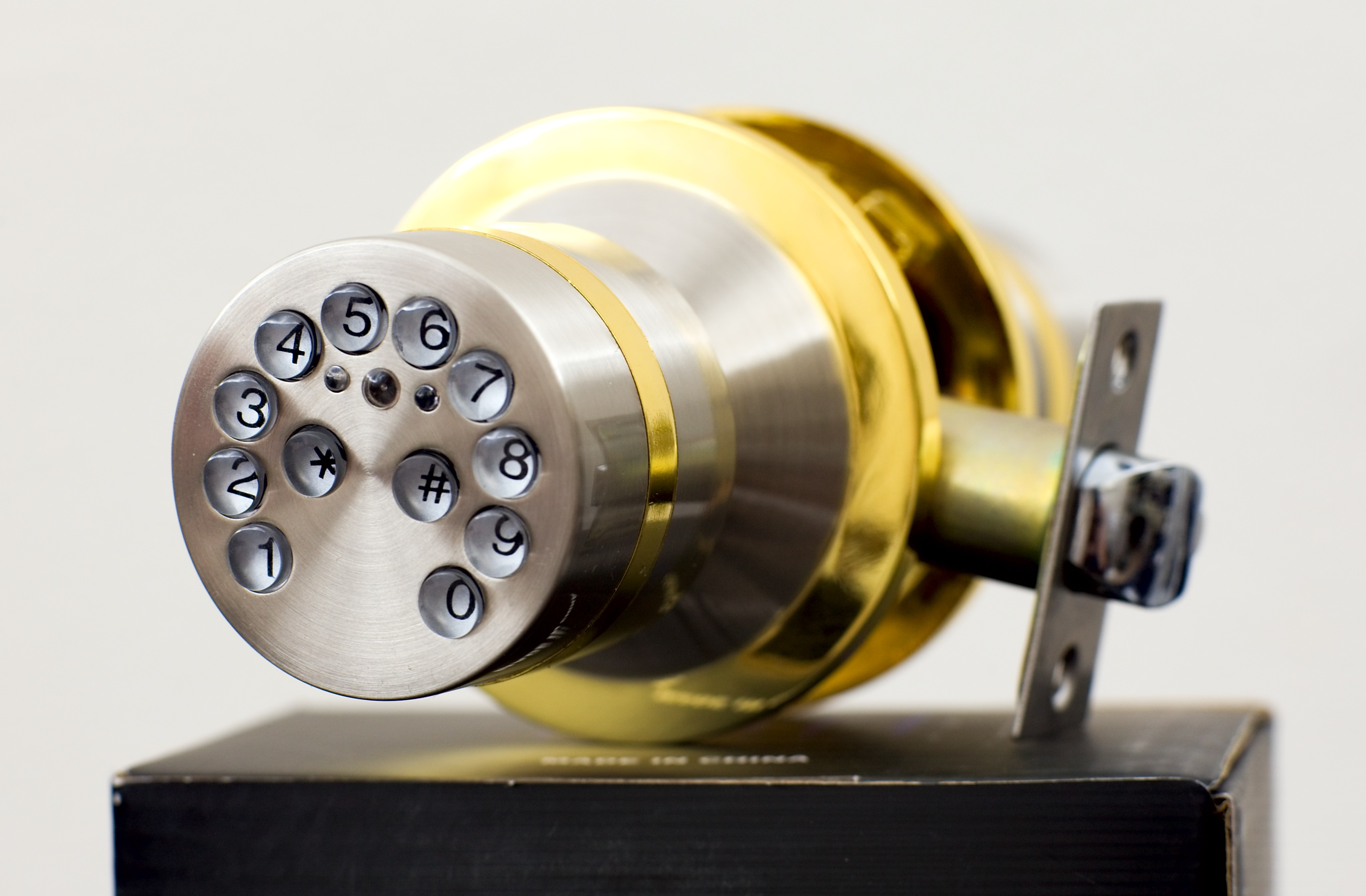

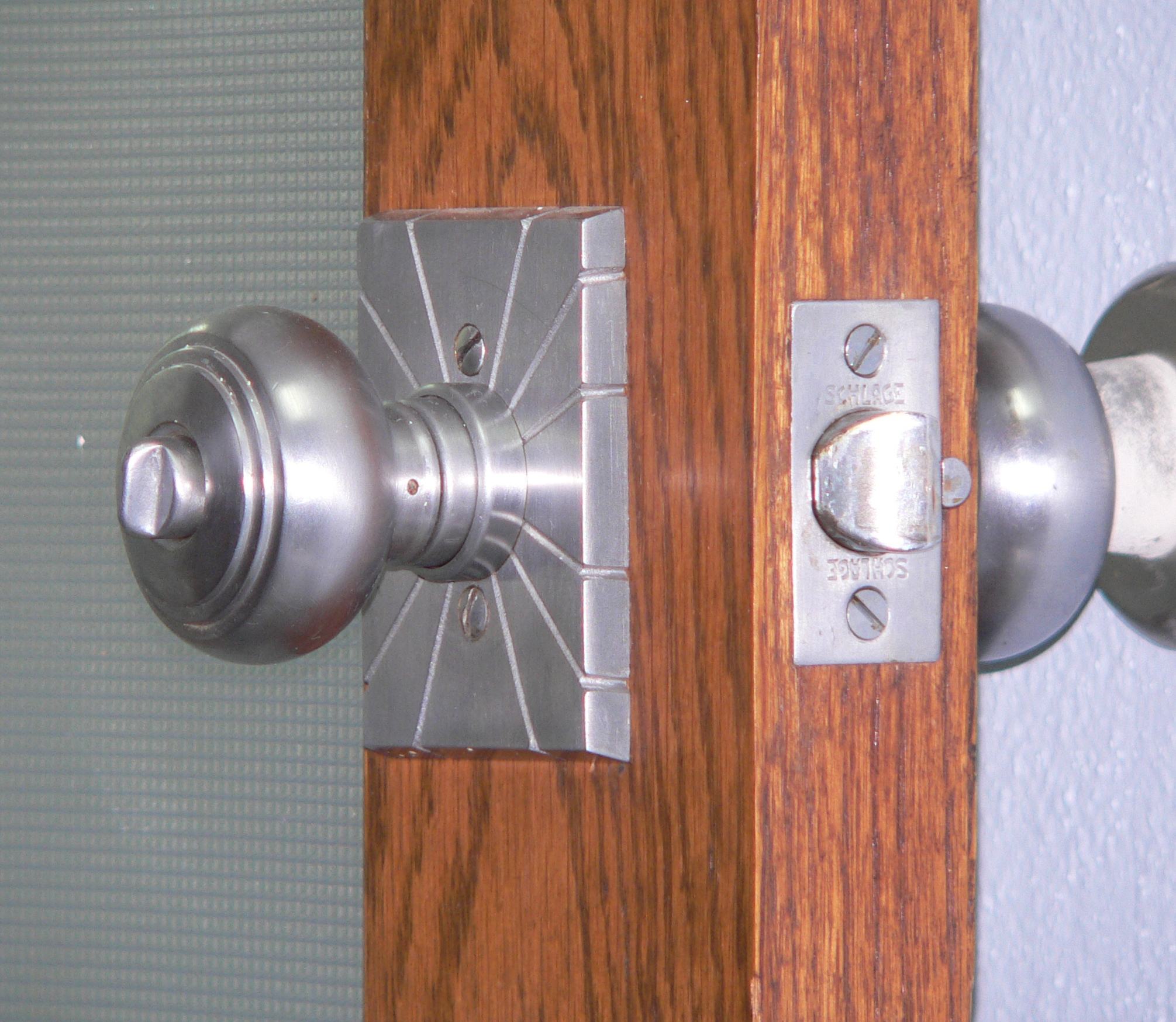

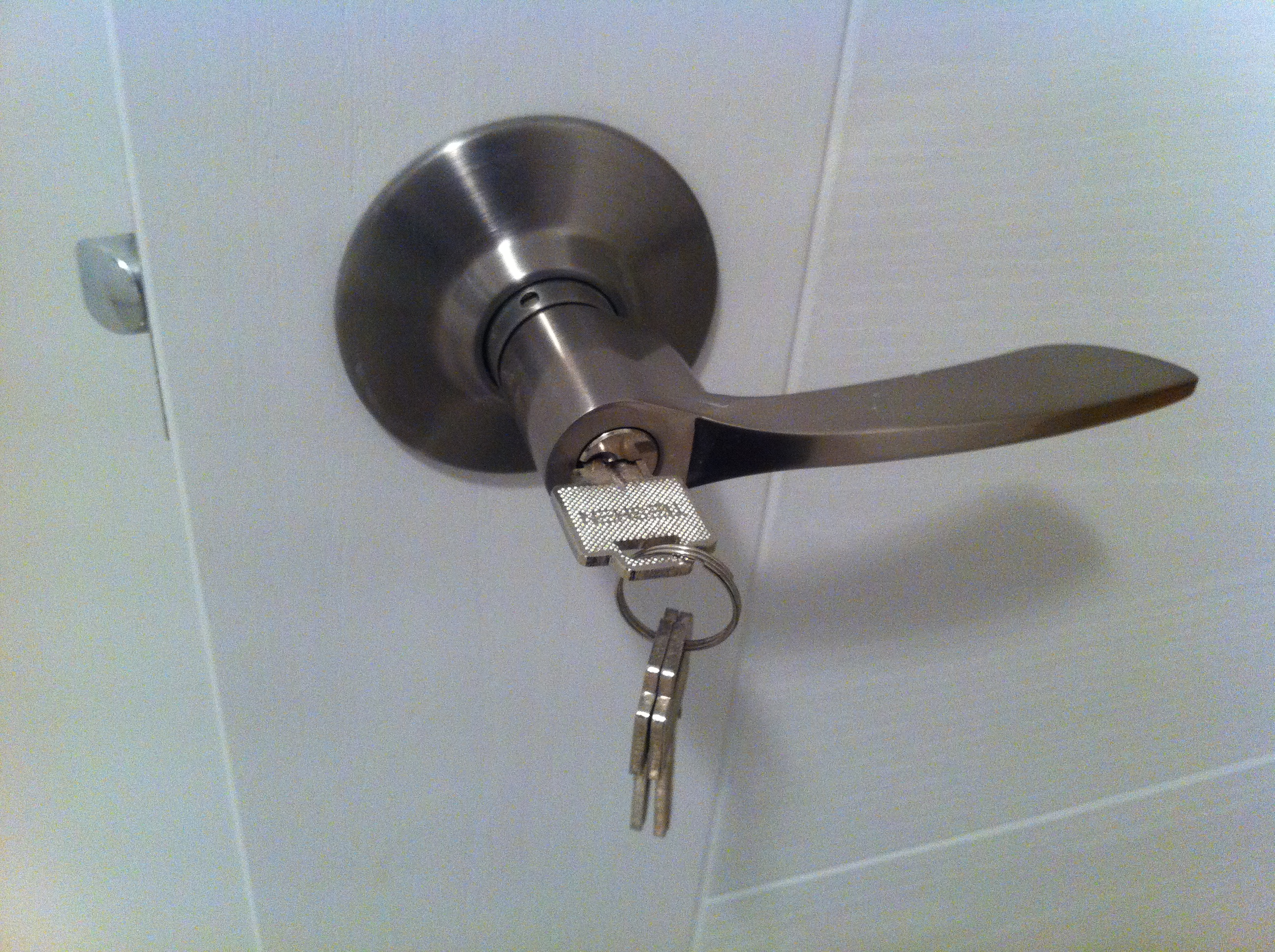

== See also ==
- Mortise lock
- Crash bar
- Rim lock
- Deadbolt
