= Segal Lock and Hardware Company =

Coordinates: 40°40′47.2″N 74°0′56.9″W

The Segal Lock and Hardware Company of Manhattan, New York, was a leading manufacturer of hardware merchandise and razor blades in the 1920s and 1930s. Established in Connecticut and Manhattan, the firm relocated to Brooklyn, New York, in the mid-1920s. The Segal Safety Razor Corporation was a subsidiary of the Segal Lock and Hardware Company. The business was at first known as the Burglar-Proof Lock Company.

Segal was started by Samuel Segal, with his brothers Louis, Hyman, Jack and Edward. Sam was formerly a New York City detective in 1912, and invented a nearly burglar-proof lock. The vertical deadbolt lock eliminated a horizontal bolt, concentrating on the hinge principle. Segal had noticed that burglars forced locks but never hinges. The firm's beginning was aided by a few more policemen. The original capital was approximately $1,000. Segal and his associates refused $1,000,000 in cash for their fifty separate lock patents. Shortly before her death Mrs. May Stevenson Segal, wife of Samuel Segal, invented a burglar-proof lock, which was marketed to a leading lock manufacturer.

== History, expansion of corporation ==
In August 1926 the business purchased a square block on Ferris Street, Sullivan Street, and Walcott Street for use as a factory and foundry to make Segal locks. Segal owned two large factory buildings, a foundry, and a machine shop on this property with the addition of this real estate. The combined floor area was 160,000 square feet (15,000 m^{2}). Segal planned to add three more large buildings at an approximate cost of $500,000. The property fronted the waterfront in the Red Hook, Brooklyn section of Brooklyn. The development enabled Segal to move two plants from Connecticut and its warehouses from Manhattan. Employment was to increase to 1,600 persons.

In November 1927 the Segal Lock and Hardware Company announced the sale of 5,000 shares of common stock and 5,000 shares of preferred stock. The stock was placed privately with no public offering made.

The company acquired a controlling interest in the Norwalk Lock Company and the Universal Razor Blade Corporation in 1929. Stockholders approved an increase in the authorized stock of the company to 400,000 shares, of which 300,000 shares were outstanding.

The corporation introduced a single-unit safety razor in late 1930, a low-priced product designed to use only Segal double-edged blades. The following year Segal placed on the market the Unimatic Segal Razor, a one-piece razor which accepted a double-edged blade. The firm entered a contract with United Cigar Stores in June 1931. The agreement was for a long term of years and stated that the cigar interest would feature and distribute Segal razors and blades.

In October 1933 the Segal Lock and Hardware Company was awarded a contract to provide the finishing hardware for 1,595 apartments in the Knickerbocker Village. This was a model housing development on the Lower East Side. It was made possible by a loan of $8,075,000 from the Reconstruction Finance Corporation.

The company sold its Stamford, Connecticut factory buildings to Macklett Laboratories, manufacturer of X-ray tubes, in March 1934.

Segal announced plans to introduce a new type of single-edged razor blade and a new aluminum window in mid-1946.

Strauss Fasteners Inc. was acquired by the Segal Lock and Hardware Company in February 1947.

Louis was the head of the company until 1952 when it went into bankruptcy and was reorganized with new management not associated with the Segal family. There was a rivalry to take over the firm by “McGoldrick Group” headed by Joseph D. McGoldrick, who said they oppose the “Markey Group” headed by D. John Markey in Feb 1952

Arrow Lock corporation was acquired in October 1952, Segal Lock president was Meade Johnson

== Litigation ==
In October 1931 the Segal Lock and Hardware Company sued Gillette (brand), asking $2,000,000 in a loss of blade contract. The suit claimed a violation of the Clayton Antitrust Act. Another suit, decided in Boston, Massachusetts, resulted in an agreement between Segal and Gillette. The former agreed to discontinue the manufacture of razor blades which infringed the Gillette patent. Segal continued to manufacture its own razors and blades which fit their own razors. However they were forced to discontinue making blades which also fit razor handles made by Gillette.
