= Adolf Schoepe =

American businessman

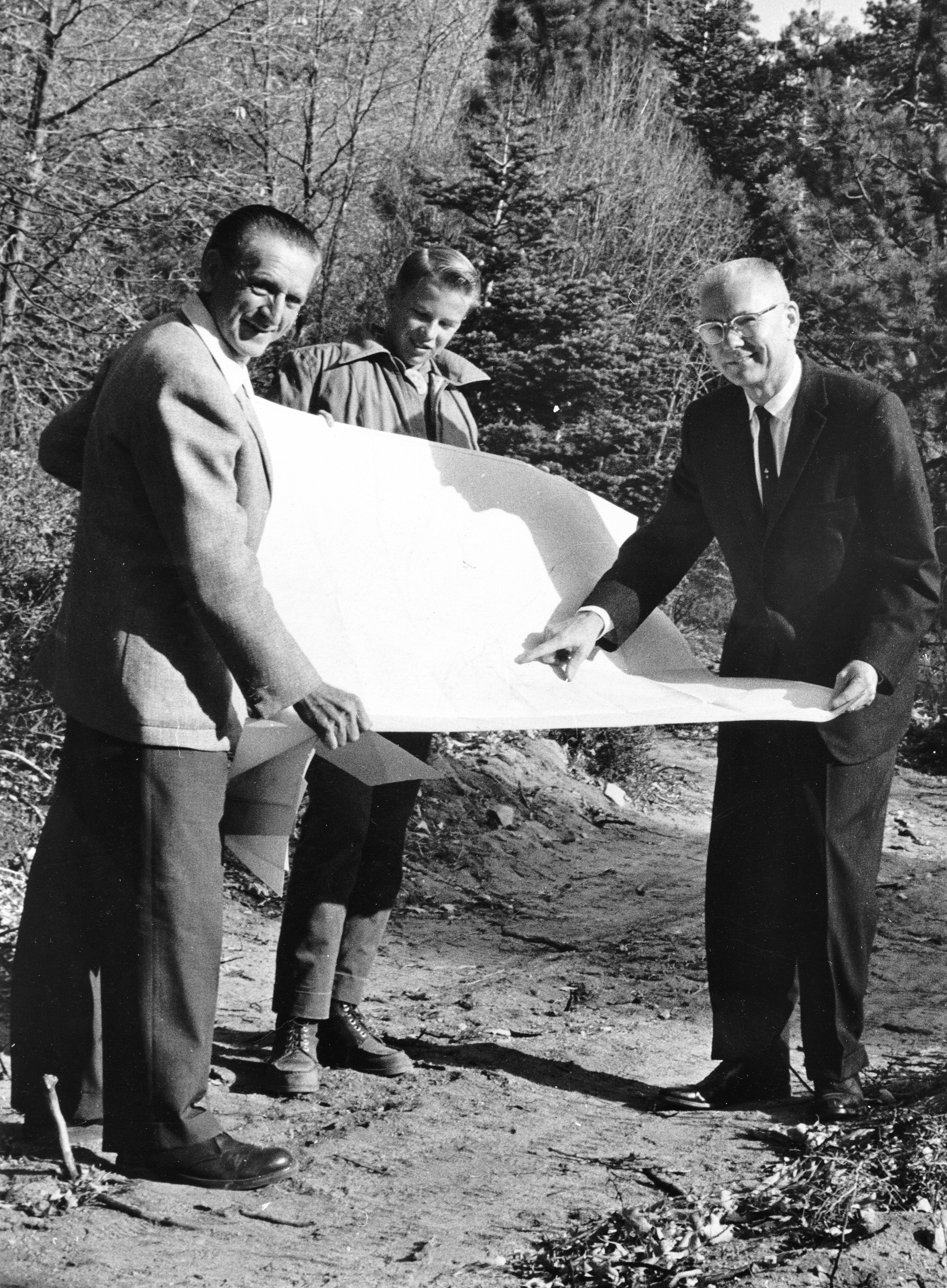
Schoepe (on left) with Boy Scout camp plans, 1963

Adolf Schoepe (January 1, 1904, Berkenroth, Germany, - July 29, 2001, Fullerton, California) was a German-American inventor and businessman.

Schoepe, a master metalworker with no formal education, emigrated to the United States in 1927. At the time he did not speak English, and had only about $25. As a young man he worked for Curtis Aviation in Saint Louis, Missouri then Spartan Aircraft Company in Tulsa, Oklahoma. He later worked at Goodyear Rubber Company in Akron, Ohio, installing power systems in dirigibles for the United States Navy, and at Boeing in Seattle, Washington, building B-17 bombers. He was a foreman at the San Diego Naval Air Station metals shop, and during World War II taught welding to women who were entering the work force.

In 1946 Schoepe and a friend, Karl Rhinehart, founded Gateway Manufacturing Co, bought out a small defunct lock company in South Gate, California, and began manufacturing the Kwikset, a line of doorlocks. Schoepe obtained patents on a number of important technical innovations on lock designs, some of which were the subject of patent litigation. Kwikset, which sold to American Hardware Corporation and ultimately to Black and Decker, became the most common brand of locks in the United States.

In 1957 Schoepe founded Fluidmaster, Inc., an aftermarket toilet tank repair kit, on the basis of a patent design he had found while working at Kwikset. He bought the patent, improved it, then spent ten years building the company until it was profitable. Sold directly to consumers, Fluidmaster kits worked more smoothly and were more durable than the original equipment and eventually became the most common toilet valves in the United States. Schoepe ran the company until 2000, when he was 96. As of Schoepe's death in 2001 the company had an 80% market share of toilet tank kits.

Schoepe lived for most of his life in Orange County, California. He was an aficionado of exotic cars and a frequent donor and volunteer for conservative causes, the Republican Party, and the Boy Scouts of America and other charities. In his later life he owned a 300-acre (120 ha) citrus ranch in Pauma Valley, California. He was married for 53 years to wife, Virginia Sherrill Schoepe. As of 2009 his son, Robert Schoepe, remained as chief executive officer of Fluidmaster.
