= Escutcheon (furniture) =

Item that surrounds a keyhole or lock cylinder on a door

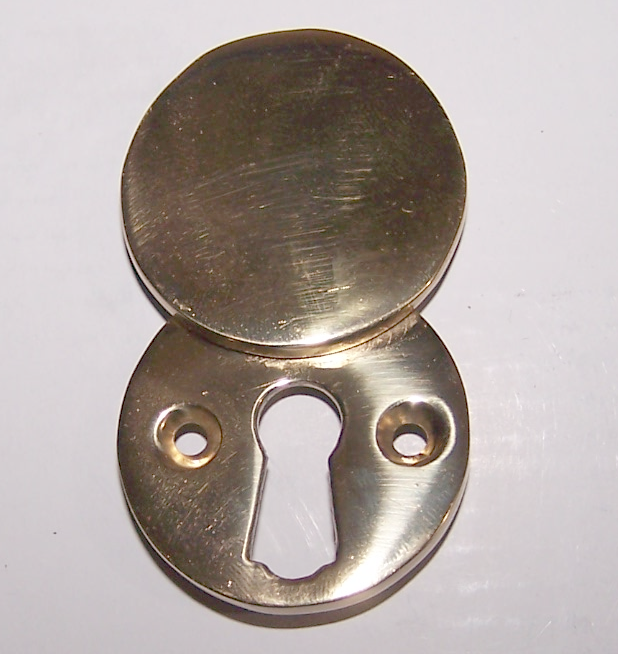
A brass escutcheon plate. The upper disc is hinged, allowing it to swivel over the open keyhole, or aside to allow the keyhole to be used.

An escutcheon (/ɪˈskʌtʃən/ ih-SKUTCH-ən) is a general term for a decorative plate used to conceal a functioning, non-architectural item. Escutcheon is an Old Norman word derived from the Latin word scutum, meaning 'a shield'. Escutcheons are most often used in conjunction with mechanical, electrical, and plumbing components and fixtures where a pipe, tube, or conduit passes through a wall (or other material) surface. The escutcheon is used to bridge the gap between the outside diameter of the pipe and the inside diameter of the opening in said surface.

An escutcheon can also refer to an item of door furniture. In this case, it is an architectural item that surrounds a keyhole or lock cylinder, and is often part of a lockset. Escutcheons help to protect a lock cylinder from being drilled out or snapped, and to protect the surrounding area from damage and wear from the end of the key when it misses the keyhole.

Some escutcheons come in pairs with a plain one to go on the outside of the door while the matching escutcheon inside has a rotating cover to prevent prying eyes. The cover also prevents animals and dust from getting into the house/room.
