= Lockset =

Locking mechanism

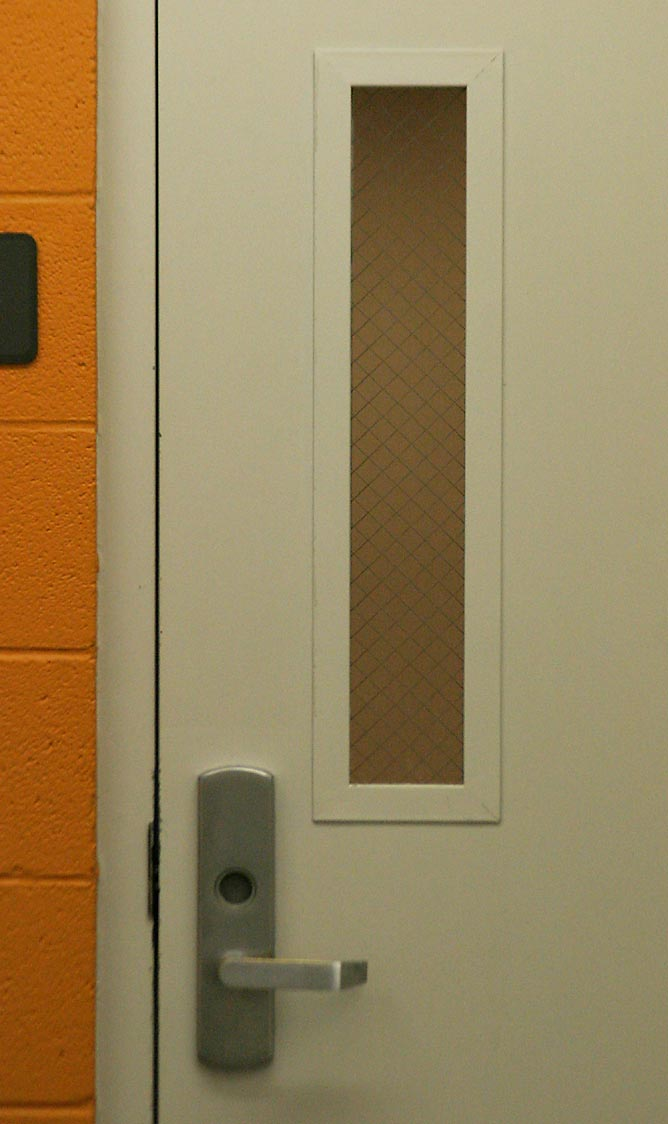
Metal fire-resistance rated door with a lockset consisting of a locking latch bolt operated by lever handle with an escutcheon that encompasses the locking mechanism.

A lockset (alternatively lock set) is the hardware and components that make up the locking or latching mechanism that can usually be found on a door or other hinged object but can also include sliding doors and dividers. The components of a lockset can include (but are not limited to) the door handles (commonly both inside and outside), latch bolt, dead bolt, face plate, strike plate, escutcheon, thumbturn, push button, turn button, and other trim. The lockset and associated hardware typically defines a door's function and how a user could (or could not) access the two adjacent spaces defined by the opening associated with the lockset.

== Regulation ==
The Americans with Disabilities Act of 1990, under Title III, and many state and local governments regulate locksets in buildings occupied by the public. Typically, locksets that employ doorknob-controlled latches are forbidden for public use in favor of lever handles, which are easier to operate by gravity instead of the grasping and turning required by knobs. Many municipalities also regulate locksets in terms of fire rating, using standards determined more broadly by national or international organizations such as Underwriters Laboratories in the United States or the International Code Council, which are often supplemented by local governmental organizations (e.g. New York City's Materials and Equipment Acceptance (MEA) Division of their Board of Standards and Appeals (BSA)), or by local building codes. For example, mandates of building code may forbid (e.g., E2141/F16 "Double-Keyed Deadbolt") from group occupancies, or require (e.g., F93/F15) certain functions on hotel or motel doors.

== Industry standards ==
The American National Standards Institute (ANSI), a private non-profit organization, and the Builders Hardware Manufacturers Association (BHMA) administer and coordinate voluntary standardization to develop and maintain performance standards for builder's hardware. Locks and handle sets are covered by standard A156.2, deadbolts by A156.5, and finishes by A156.18.

== Aspects of a lockset ==
=== Three standard grades ===
The grade specified according to the standards of ANSI/BHMA indicate the security and durability of the lockset.

==== Grade 1 ====
Commercial, highest grade security and durability; can survive a 360-pound (160 kg) weight test.

==== Grade 2 ====
Residential, with excellent security and durability; can survive a 250-pound (110 kg) weight test.

==== Grade 3 ====
Residential, minimum acceptable grade.

=== Two lockset mechanisms ===
The lockset's latching (locking) mechanism may be of the mortise or cylindrical type. The mortise mechanism is enclosed in a box (usually metal), requiring installation in a rectangular cavity carved into the edge of the door. The cylindrical mechanism is typically installed into the door via a cavity that can be simply bored through the door, usually by using a hole saw.

=== Two types of latches ===
A lockset may incorporate a latch bolt, a deadbolt, or may integrate both into a single lockset.

==== Latch bolt ====
The latch bolt is spring-loaded and has an angled surface, allowing the door to be closed and latched without first retracting the bolt. In addition, the bolt may be fitted with a guardbolt, which is arranged to prevent the unwanted retraction of the latch bolt by an intruder; in this case the latch bolt is called a deadlocking latch bolt. There may be a provision on the inside handle to disable (lock) the outside handle from operating the latch bolt; this is referred to in the table below as the "inside locking mechanism". This mechanism may consist of a push button or turn button in the inside handle.

==== Deadbolt ====
A deadbolt is projected (thrown) only after the door is in the closed position; it will resist being forcibly retracted once it is in its projected position, hence is known as a deadlock. If it is projected or retracted by a handle (rather than by a key), that handle is referred to in the table below as a "thumbturn".

=== Keyed and non-keyed locksets ===
A lockset may be fitted with a keyable lock on inside, on outside, or not at all, the latter being known as a "non-keyed lockset". If the lockset has a single keyed side, it is called a "keyed, single-cylinder lockset"; if both sides are keyed, it is called a "keyed, double-cylinder lockset". In this aspect, the word "cylinder" refers to any type of keyed cylinder lock, rather than to the type of mechanism of the lockset.

=== Door function ===
Locksets come in many variant types, each appropriate to a particular use. Lockset manufacturers may describe a lockset product in terms of how a door is operated by a user, while ANSI/BHMA assign standard alphanumeric codes to the function of a lockset. For accurate and precise descriptions, the standard function code should be used when specifying a lockset.

==== Typical applications ====
===== Closet door =====
May use a lockset consisting of two operating handles, both of which are never locked. A cylindrical mechanism lockset on such a door would be given the ANSI code F75, a mortised lockset F01.

===== Bathroom/WC =====
A lockset for such a door typically includes a provision to lock from the inside, preserving the privacy of the occupant, along with a means of unlocking from the outside in case of emergency (lockset F76B/F19).

===== Office Door =====
A typical use case occurs upon departing the office: the user pushes a button on the inside handle, locking the door, then pulls the door shut behind. The door must now be opened with a key. The F82(F04) function works for this case.

===== Server Room =====
For enhanced security, the addition of a deadbolt is useful. The F88/F09 "Entrance" function allows the door to be locked from the outside with a key, while still allowing people inside to freely leave without a key.

===== Break Room =====
Door may be specified as non-locking; the F75/F01 "Passage" function serves the purpose.

===== Medical Storage Closet =====
Door should be locked at all times, calling for the F86/F07 "Storeroom" function.

===== Classroom function =====
Designated F84/F05, which allows occupants out of the room regardless if the door is locked. In the wake of school shootings, the F110 lockset may be desirable: it allows the outside handle to be locked by using a key on the inside, but still allows occupants free egress.

==== ANSI/BHMA door function codes ====
- The latch bolt may be specified as the deadlocking type; if so, the fact is explicitly stated.
- A deadbolt, if present, automatically deadlocks when fully projected.
- In the table below, "handle" may refer to either a lever or a knob; the former is preferred equipment for usability sake. Some manufacturers refer to "trim".
- "Inoperable" may be considered synonymous with "locked"; the locked handle may be immovable, or it may freely turn but without opening the door. For some manufacturers' locksets, a locked handle is immoveable, and they use the term "rigid" in referring to a handle that is locked.
- The inside handle may have an affordance for locking the latch bolt: it may be a push button, a turn button, or may operate in both modes. It is referred to in the table as the "inside locking mechanism".
- There may be an (inside) affordance to project or retract the deadbolt; it is referred to in the table below as a "thumbturn".
- In some lockset functions, the inside handle retracts the latch (and deadbolt, if present) even when the door is locked; this feature is intended to allow those inside to open the door without difficulty under possible emergency circumstances.
- In some lockset functions, operating the inside handle or closing the door has the effect of canceling the lock on the outside handle; this feature may be thought of as protecting the user from inadvertently locking him- or herself out.

ANSI/BHMA function codes for cylindrical and mortise locksets
Non-keyed locksets
Cylindrical	Mortise	Function label	Description	Example locations
—	—	Dummy	Handle on one side only, not operative. No latch.	Decorative doors, cabinets, office restrooms
F89	—	Exit	Deadlocking latch bolt operated by inside handle only; outside handle inoperable at all times.	Exit-only door
F111	F31	Exit	Deadlocking latch bolt operated by inside handle only. Blank plate outside (13/16" (31 mm) projection).	Exit-only door
F75	F01	Passage, Closet	Latch bolt operated by handle from either side at all times.	Residential closets, any door that must be latched, does not require locking.
F76A	F22	Privacy Bath/Bedroom	Latch bolt operated by handle from either side. Outside handle is locked by inside locking mechanism. It is unlocked by emergency release outside, by operating inside handle, or by closing the door.	Single stall or residential bathrooms, offices, bedrooms
F76B	—	Privacy Bath/Bedroom	Latch bolt operated by handle from either side, except when outside handle is locked by locking device inside (inside handle always operates latch bolt). Locking device shall automatically release when inside handle is operated, or door is closed. Emergency release on outside shall permit outside handle to operate latch bolt.	Single stall or residential bathrooms, offices, bedrooms
—	F02	Privacy Bath/Bedroom	Handle from either side retracts latch bolt at all times. Thumbturn retracts and projects deadbolt. Emergency release retracts and projects deadbolt. Latch bolt and deadbolt operate independently of each other.	
—	F19	Privacy Bath/Bedroom	Latch bolt operated by outside handle, except when deadbolt is projected. Inside thumbturn projects deadbolt. When inside handle is operated, both latch bolt and deadbolt retract simultaneously, and outside handle is unlocked. Emergency release on outside retracts and projects deadbolt.	Single stall or residential bathrooms, offices, bedrooms
F76B	—	Patio, Privacy	Deadlocking latch bolt operated by handle from either side, except when outside handle is locked by locking device inside (inside handle always operates latch bolt). Locking device releases automatically when inside handle is operated or when door is closed.	
Keyed latch bolt locksets, single cylinder
Cylindrical	Mortise	Function label	Description	Example locations
F112	—	Communicating Storeroom	Deadlocking latch bolt operated by inside key only. Outside has blank rose. Inside is inoperable. Should be used only where rooms have more than one exit.	
F113	—	Communicating	Deadlocking latch bolt operated by inside handle except when locked by key. Non-removable blank plate outside (13/16" (31 mm) projection).	
F81	—	Entry, Office	Deadlocking latch bolt operated by handle both sides. Outside handle is rendered inoperative via inside locking mechanism, which must be released manually. Key (in outside handle) only retracts latch bolt when outside handle is locked.	
F82	F04	Entry, Office	Deadlocking latch bolt operated by handle both sides. Outside handle is rendered inoperative via inside locking mechanism, which is released by key or by turning inside handle. Closing door neither unlocks outside handle nor releases the lock.	Classrooms, commercial storage closets
F82B	—	Entry, Office	Deadlocking latch bolt operated by handle from either side except when outside handle is locked by locking device on inside (inside handle always operates latch bolt). Inside locking mechanism locks outside handle (automatically releases when inside handle is operated or key unlocks outside handle). When outside handle is locked, operating key in outside handle retracts latch bolt and unlocks locking device.	
F109	—	Entry	Deadlocking latch bolt operated by handle from either side except when outside handle is locked by the inside locking mechanism (inside handle always operates latch bolt). Key outside or operating inside handle releases inside locking mechanism, except when mechanism has been rotated to keep outside handle locked. Inside locking mechanism must be manually operated to unlock outside handle.	
F84	F05	Classroom	Deadlocking latch bolt operated by handle from either side except when outside handle is locked from outside by key (inside handle always operates latch bolt).	Classrooms, commercial storage closets, utility room
F86	F07	Storeroom / Closet / Vestibule	Deadlocking latch bolt operated by key in outside handle, or by operating inside handle (inside handle always operates latch bolt). Outside handle is inoperable at all times.	Commercial: storerooms, closets, apartment / office buildings, shared exterior entry / exit, commercial bathrooms, interior offices, fire exits, electronic strikes
F90	—	Corridor, Dormitory	Deadlocking latch bolt operated by handle from either side, except when outside handle is locked by key in outside handle or by inside locking mechanism (which cannot be activated unless door is in closed position); inside handle is always operable. Key in outside handle locks or unlocks outside handle. Operating the inside handle automatically releases the inside locking mechanism. Closing the door automatically releases the inside locking mechanism.	
F92	—	Service Station	Deadlocking latch bolt operated by handle from either side except when outside handle is locked by inside locking mechanism. Key retracts latch bolt when outside handle is locked. Inside locking mechanism can not be activated unless door is in closed position. Inside locking mechanism released by turning inside handle or by key in outside handle, unless inside locking mechanism is fixed in locked position by turning coin slot in inside handle.	
F93	—	Hotel, Dormitory, Apartment	Deadlocking latch bolt operated by key outside and by handle inside. Outside handle always inoperative. Depressing inside locking mechanism when door is closed shuts out all keys except emergency key and projects visual occupancy indicator in cylinder face (inside locking mechanism will not activate unless door is in closed position). Inside locking mechanism released by turning inside handle, automatically reactivating all keys and retracting visual occupancy indicator. Lock out key fixes inside locking mechanism in locked position, shutting out all keys except emergency key.	Hotel room
—	F26	Institutional Privacy	Key outside retracts latch bolt, overriding thumbturn when held in locked position. Thumbturn inside locks and unlocks outside handle. Handle outside unlocks when the door closes or by operating handle inside. Handle inside always retracts latch bolt. Note: Key does not lock handle outside, only unlocks it.	
—	F06	Holdback	Key outside retracts latch bolt, also locks and unlocks outside handle. Handle inside always retracts latch bolt. Holdback function: to set, rotate and hold handle, then rotate key twice toward latch bolt. Handle will remain in rotated position indicating that it is unlocked.	
Keyed latch bolt locksets, double cylinder
Cylindrical	Mortise	Function label	Description	Example locations
F80	—	Communicating	Deadlocking latch bolt operated by either handle. Key in either handle locks or unlocks its own handle only.	
F87	F30	Utility, Asylum, Institutional	Deadlocking latch bolt operated by key inside or outside. Handle inside and outside are inoperative at all times.	Asylum room
F88	F09	Classroom, Security, Apartment, Exit, Privacy	Deadlocking latch bolt operated by either handle unless outside handle is locked by key in inside handle. When outside handle is locked, key in outside handle only retracts latch bolt: outside handle can only be unlocked by key in inside handle.	
F110	F32	Intruder Classroom	Deadlocking latch bolt operated by handle from either side (inside handle always operates latch bolt). Key either inside or outside locks or unlocks outside handle. Key from either side retracts latch bolt.	
—	—	Classroom Security Intruder	Deadlocking latch bolt operated by either handle unless outside handle is locked by key (inside handle always operates latch bolt). Key in either handle locks or unlocks outside handle. When inside key locks the outside handle, only the inside key can unlock the outside handle: the outside key only retracts the latch bolt once outside handle is unlocked by inside key.	
Deadlocks
Cylindrical	Mortise	Function label	Description	Example locations
E2161	F18	Deadlock with Blank plate	Deadbolt operated by key outside only.	
E21112	—	Deadlock, Thumbturn	Deadbolt operated by thumbturn inside only (outside blank plate).	
E2192	—	Deadlock, Thumbturn only	Deadbolt operated by thumbturn inside only (no trim outside).	
E2142	F16	Deadlock, Double Cylinder	Deadbolt operated by key outside and inside.	
E2152	F17	Deadlock	Deadbolt operated by key outside; by thumbturn inside.	
E0172	F29	Classroom Deadlock	Deadbolt operated by key outside. Thumbturn inside retracts deadbolt only, will not project it.	
Keyed locksets with both latch bolt and deadbolt
Cylindrical	Mortise	Function label	Description	Example locations
cf. F81	F08	Entry, Corridor	Deadlocking latch bolt operated by handle both sides. Key and thumbturn both retract and project deadbolt. Handle outside is locked by toggle or by projecting deadbolt, and is unlocked by toggle only. Key retracts both latch bolt and deadbolt; handle outside remains locked. Handle inside retracts latch bolt only; deadbolt is retracted manually, and handle outside remains locked.	
—	F12	Dormitory, Exit	Key outside or thumbturn inside retracts and projects deadbolt. Key outside retracts both latch bolt and deadbolt, handle outside remains locked. Handle outside is locked by toggle or by projecting deadbolt. When the deadbolt is projected, handle inside retracts latch bolt and deadbolt simultaneously, and handle outside remains inoperative.	
cf. F90	F13	Dormitory, Exit	Key outside or thumbturn inside retracts and projects deadbolt. When the deadbolt is in the retracted position, handle from either side retracts latch bolt. When the deadbolt is projected, handle outside is locked. When the deadbolt is projected, handle inside retracts latch bolt and deadbolt simultaneously, unlocking handle outside.	
—	F14	Storeroom	Key from either side retracts and projects deadbolt. Handle from either side retracts latch bolt. Latch bolt and deadbolt are independent of each other. Not recommended for use on any door used for Life Safety egress.	
—	F15	Hotel Guest	Standard key outside retracts latch bolt only and will not retract or project deadbolt; emergency key outside will retract latch bolt and deadbolt and also project deadbolt. Thumbturn inside retracts and projects deadbolt. Handle inside retracts both latch bolt and deadbolt simultaneously. Handle outside is always inoperable.	
—	F20	Entry, Apartment	Key outside or thumbturn inside retracts and projects deadbolt. Key outside retracts both latch bolt and deadbolt, handle outside remains locked. Handle outside is locked by toggle or projecting deadbolt and is unlocked by toggle only. With deadbolt projected, handle inside retracts latch bolt and deadbolt simultaneously, and handle outside remains locked.	
—	F21	Room	Key outside or thumbturn inside retracts and projects deadbolt. Handle either side retracts latch bolt. Latch bolt and deadbolt operate independently of each other.	
—	F25	Storeroom	Key from either side retracts and projects deadbolt. Key from either side retracts latch bolt. Handle outside is locked by toggle or by projecting deadbolt and is unlocked by toggle only. When deadbolt is projected, handle inside retracts latch bolt only, and outside trim remains locked.	
—	F33	Classroom Security Intruder Deadbolt	Deadlocking latch bolt operated by handle inside or outside. Key from either side retracts or projects deadbolt, which also unlocks or locks outside handle. Outside handle can only be locked by projecting the deadbolt.	
—	F34	Classroom Security Intruder Deadbolt	Deadlocking latch bolt operated by handle inside or outside. Key from either side retracts or projects deadbolt, which also unlocks or locks outside handle. Outside handle can only be locked by projecting the deadbolt. Auxiliary deadlatch.	
F95	—	Interconnected Latch bolt and Deadbolt, Single-Locking Entry	Latch bolt operated by handle from either side. Rotating thumbturn from inside or key from outside extends deadbolt to locked position. Both deadbolt and latch bolt are retracted to unlocked position by operating inside handle.	
F97	—	Entry, Double-Locking	Deadlocking latch bolt is operated by handle from either side except when outside handle is made inoperable by locking device inside. When outside handle is locked, deadlocking latch bolt is operated by key outside. Inside locking device is manually operated to unlock outside handle. Rotating turn from inside or key from outside extends deadbolt to locked position. Operating inside handle always retracts both deadbolt and latch bolt. Closing door shall not release locking device inside.	
F98	—	Storeroom, Double-Locking	Deadlocking latch bolt is operated by handle from either side except when outside handle is locked. Key in deadbolt cylinder outside retracts and projects deadbolt; thumb turn inside retracts and projects deadbolt. Handle outside is locked and unlocked manually with handle turn button inside. When outside handle is locked, key in outside handle retracts latch bolt. Handle inside retracts both latch bolt and deadbolt simultaneously.	
