= Window handle =

Part of a window

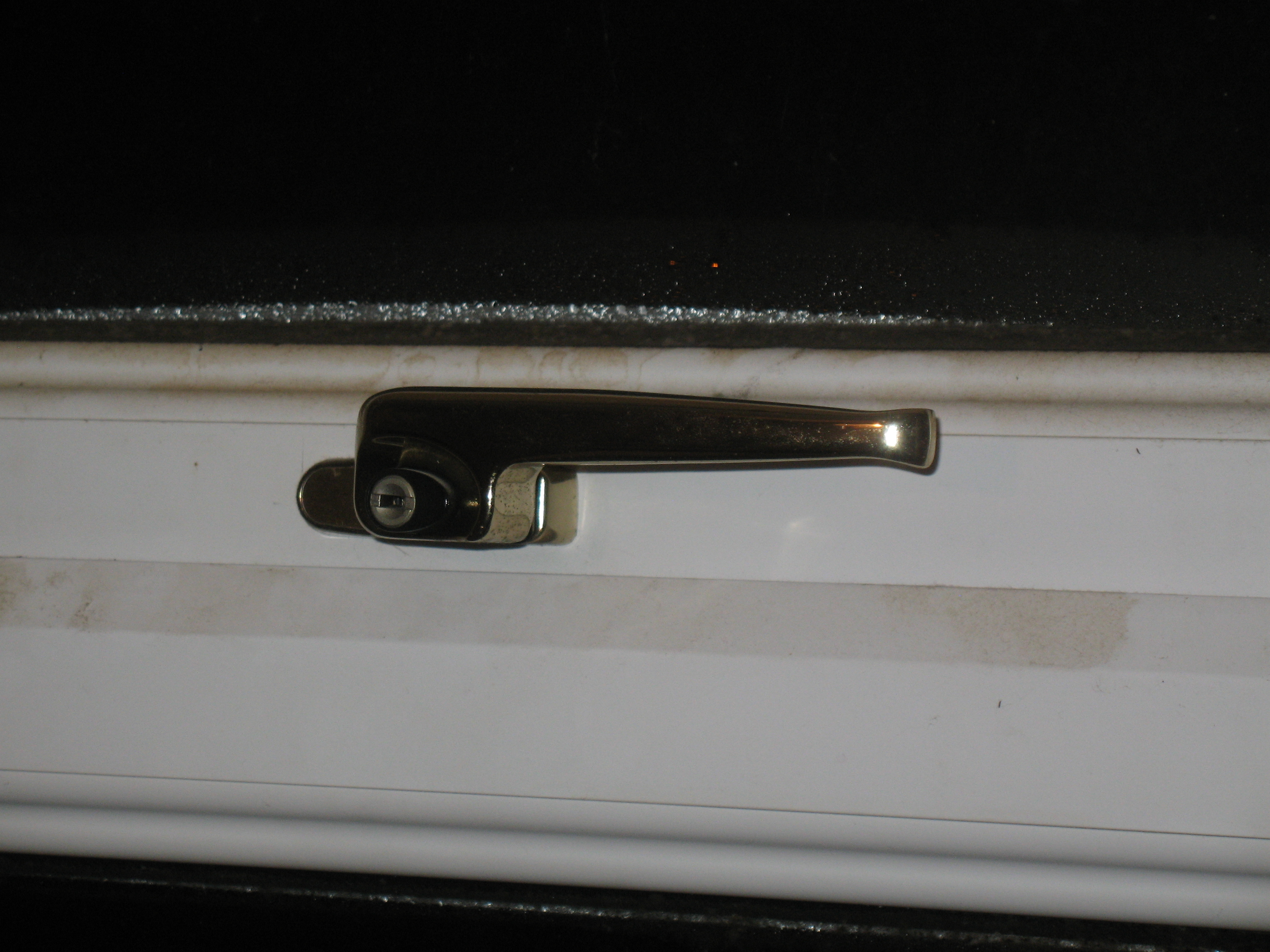
A typical modern lockable window handle (without holes)

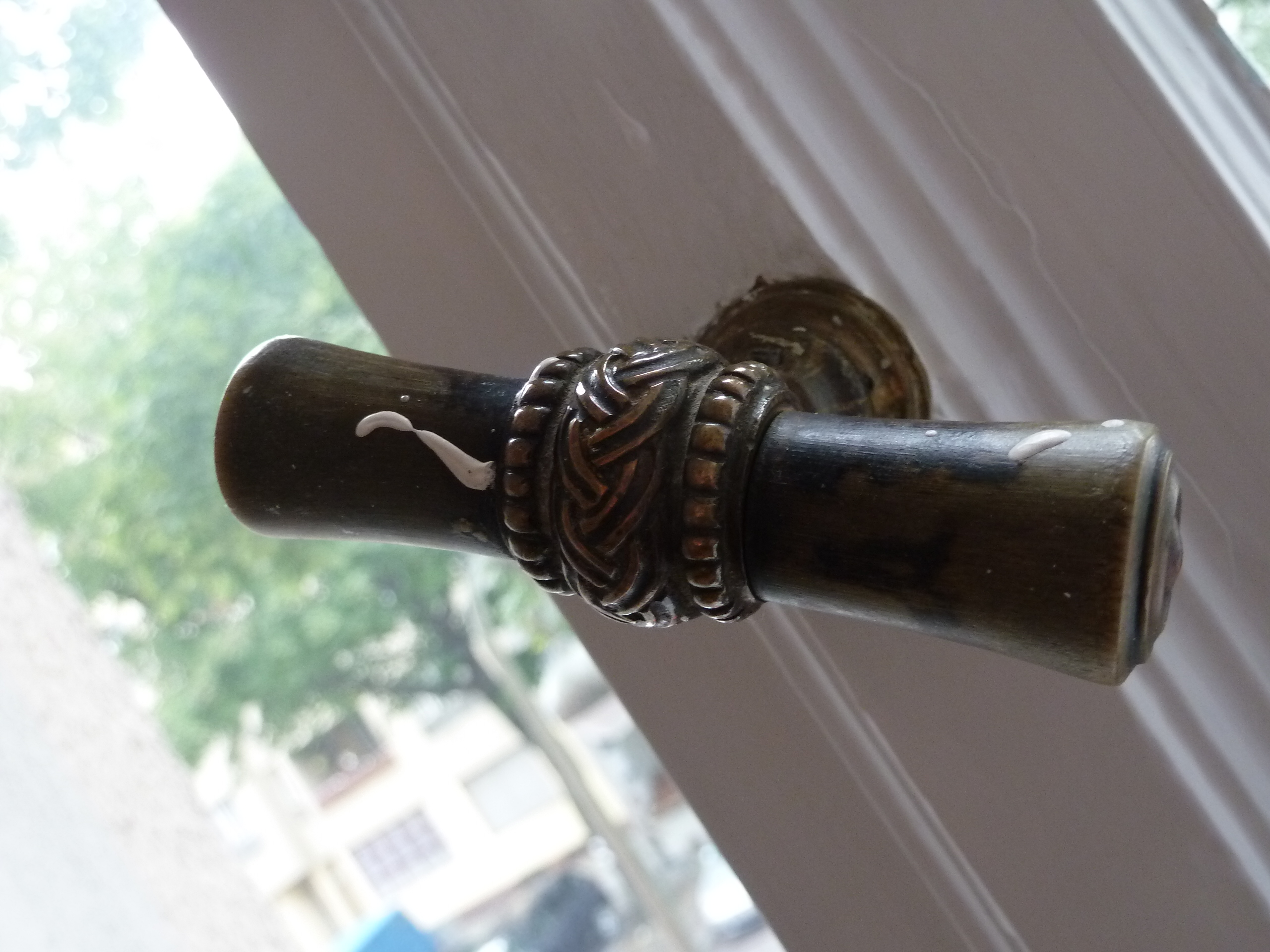
A window handle in Berlin

A window handle is a short length of material that attaches to a window in order to aid rotation of the hinge and therefore opening and closing of the window. It often contains holes allowing the window to be fastened into place onto a spike at a distance preferred by the operator of the device allowing for outside air to circulate into the room, removing the need for the operator to have to hold the handle permanently at that distance in order to enjoy this benefit.

== Types of window handles ==
- Venetian window handles – are typically fixed by two bolts. Also have a low projection from the frame.
- Espag window handles – has a mental spindle on the back which is attached to the window frame, driving the window mechanism. The spindle is always fixed in position to allow for a firm and secure fixture.
- Cockspur window handles – are typically fixed by three or four screws which are installed directly into the window's opening.
- Tilt and turn handle – is commonly used in high rise flats, as their design makes them easy to clean from the inside.
- Monkey tail window handle – is shaped like a monkey's tail, long and with a curve at the bottom.
- Spade handles – also known as blade handles, is typically made from aluminium or UPVC depending on the design and material of windows. These handles also use the two-peg locking mechanism.

== See also ==
- Handle (grip)
