= Walter Schlage =

Walter Reinhold Schlage (1882–1946) was a German-born American engineer and inventor. Known as the Lock Wizard of Thuringia, he is best known for the bored cylindrical lock and the lock company that bears his name, Schlage Lock Co.

== Early training and travels ==
Early on in his life, his father recognized his aptitude for mechanics and academics and worked on his behalf to have his son admitted to the Carl Zeiss Optical Works in Jena, Germany. During his apprenticeship, Schlage learned drafting, applied mechanics and engineering. After four years, he graduated with a special award of merit, as a result of his applied scholarship.

Walter developed a sense of adventure whetted by guests that stayed in his father's hotel, in Thuringia, Germany. Following his training he left Germany for London where he worked as an instrument maker for Hileger, Ltd. Lasting a year in England, he emigrated to the United States where he gained employment with the Western Electric Company.

With a continuing desire to see the world however, Schlage signed on as a ship's engineer and sailed for Brazil, the West Indies, and Central America. Eventually, Schlage worked his way to California and San Francisco, where Western Electric Company again employed him.

== Inventions and business history ==
His first patent was in 1909, inventing a door lock that turned lights on and off. At the time, Schlage was a citizen of Germany residing in Berkeley, California.

In 1919, Schlage patented a door knob which, when pushed up, locked the door. This was succeeded by a door knob incorporating a push-button lock, patented in 1924. By then, Schlage had moved to San Francisco.

Leaving employment with Western Electric Company in 1920, Schlage opened a shop in San Francisco in the present-day financial district. The Schlage Lock Company was incorporated with a starting capital of $30. In the same year, he applied for a patent for a lock that could be drilled into a door with only two holes. This new cylindrical lock had a single plate, serving as both escutcheon and striker plate, wrapping around the door's edge. It was mostly used on interior doors, where it replaced the older Mortise lock.

Schlage's new company grew quickly and into larger facilities throughout the 1920s. The company was manufacturing 20,000 locks per month in 1925. In 1927, Schlage partnered with a San Francisco businessman and financier, Charles H. Kendrick.

In 1940, Schlage was awarded the Modern Pioneer award given to outstanding American inventors.

Schlage died in 1946.
