= Peephole =

Small, round opening through a door

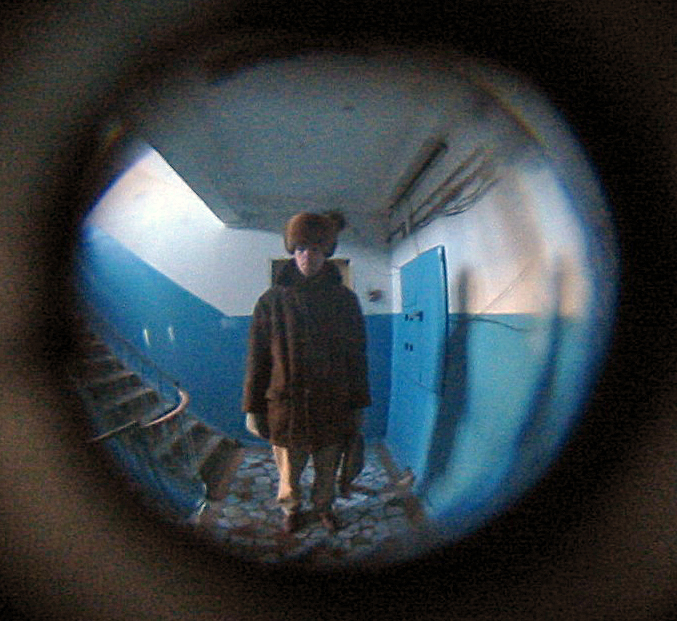
View through a peephole

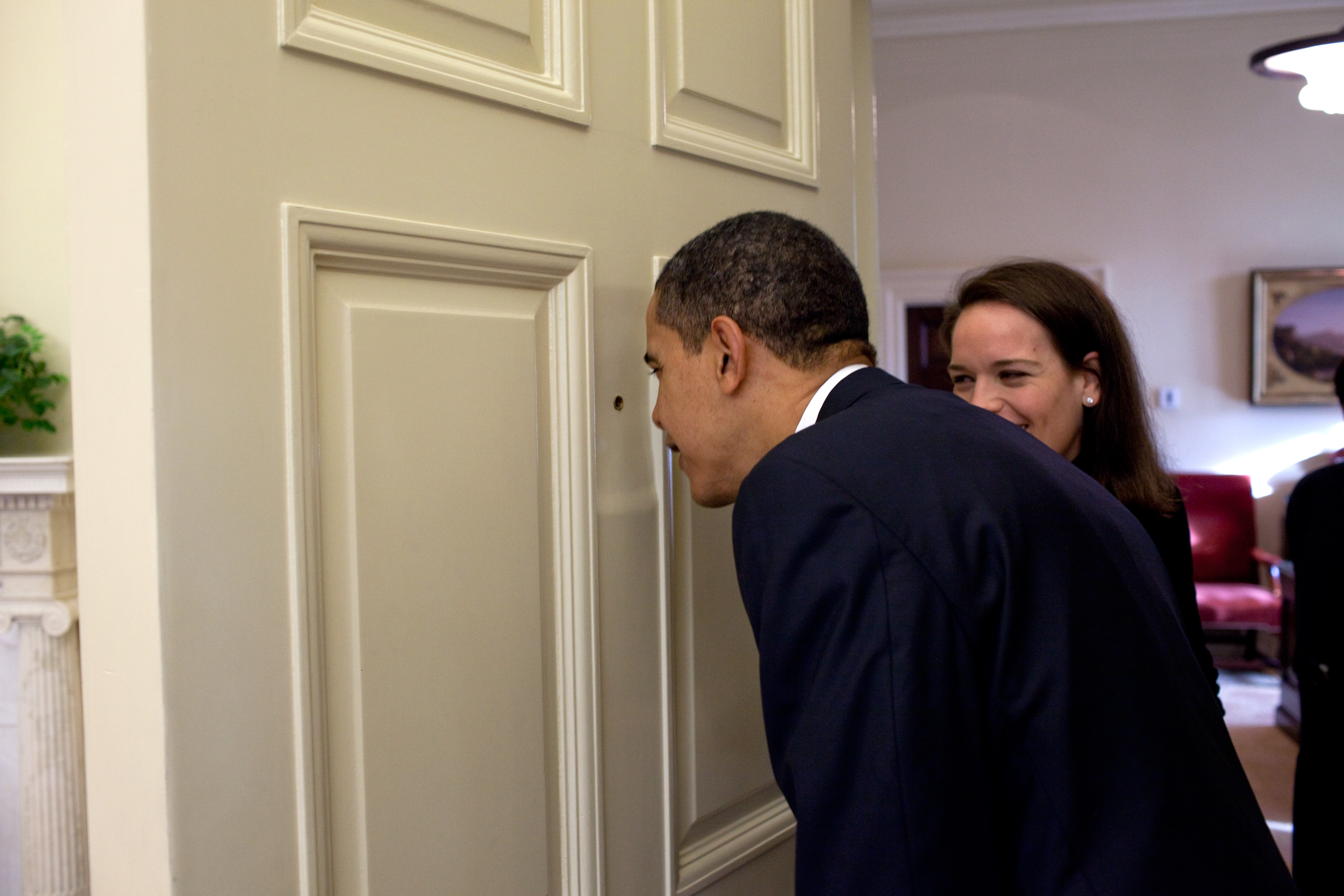
Barack Obama looking through the Oval Office door peephole

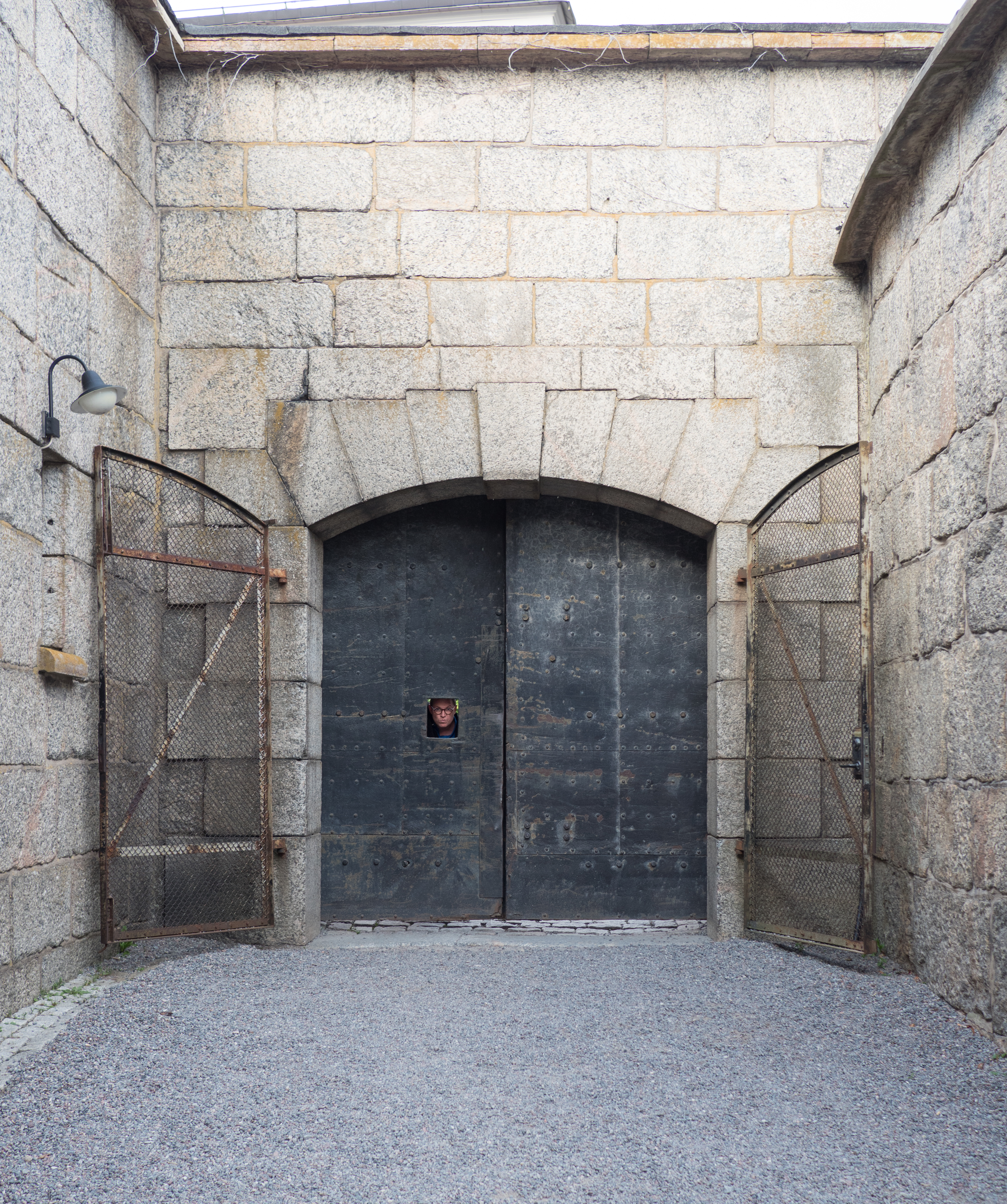
Door viewer in the gate of Vaxholm Fortress

A modern peephole, peekhole, spyhole, doorhole, magic eye, magic mirror or door viewer is a small, round opening through a door from which a viewer on the inside of a dwelling may "peek" to see directly outside the door. The lenses are made and arranged in such a way that viewing is only possible in one direction. The opening is typically no larger than the diameter of a button (0.7 inches, 18 mm).

In a door, usually for apartments or hotel rooms, a peephole enables one to see outside without opening the door or revealing one's presence. Glass peepholes are often fitted with a fisheye lens to allow a wider field of view from the inside.

== Preventing inside viewability ==
Simple peepholes may allow people outside to see inside. A fisheye lens offers little visibility from the outside, but that can be defeated using a peephole reverser. Some peepholes have a shutter that falls down on the hole when nobody inside is holding it. Digital peepholes have a camera outside and an LCD screen inside, without any information going from the inside to the outside.

Another design to prevent people outside from seeing in involves the outside-facing lens projecting an image onto a semi-opaque frosted or ground glass screen. An inside viewer can see the other side of the door from an arm's length away, rather than by peering through a small hole, while the frosted glass finish makes it impossible for someone to look through from the outside. There are drawbacks to the projection method: the area to be viewed must be well lit, and installation requires a much larger hole in the door than a traditional peephole.
