= Architectural ironmongery =

Functional and decorative hardware for buildings

Architectural ironmongery or architectural hardware is a term used for the manufacture and wholesale distribution of items made from iron, steel, brass, aluminium or other metals, including plastics, for use in all types of buildings. Architectural ironmongery includes door handles, closers, locks, cylinder pulls and hinges (door furniture), window fittings, cupboard fittings, iron railings, handrails, balustrades, switches and sockets.

The term is sometimes used to distinguish between these items and retail of consumer goods sold in ironmongers' shops or hardware stores.

== History ==
Use of ironware in buildings has a long tradition, with local blacksmiths producing items for use in houses, churches and other buildings. During the Industrial Revolution, mass production of ironmongery became more widespread, though businesses often remained regionally focused. For example, in the UK, Laidlaw was founded in Manchester in 1876; Derby-based Bennetts Ironmongery can trace its history back to 1734; William Tonks & Sons was established in Leeds in 1789; and Quiggins served the Victorian era Liverpool market. The West Midlands region saw several well-known businesses established: Parker Winder & Achurch started in Birmingham in 1836, J Legge in Willenhall in 1881, and William Newton in Wolverhampton in 1750 (relocating to Birmingham in the 1820s).

After the Second World War, the industry began to consolidate. For example, the Newton and Tonks businesses merged in 1970, acquired Legge in 1988 and Laidlaw in 1993, and were then taken over by Ingersoll Rand in 1997, and are today part of Ingersoll Rand Security Technologies.

The Guild of Architectural Ironmongers was established in 1961 to promote standards in the business of architectural ironmongery. It manages an industry accreditation scheme, GuildMark, and runs an education programme, including a three-year diploma course and a Registered Architectural Ironmonger (RegAI) scheme.
