= Deadbolt =

Locking mechanism

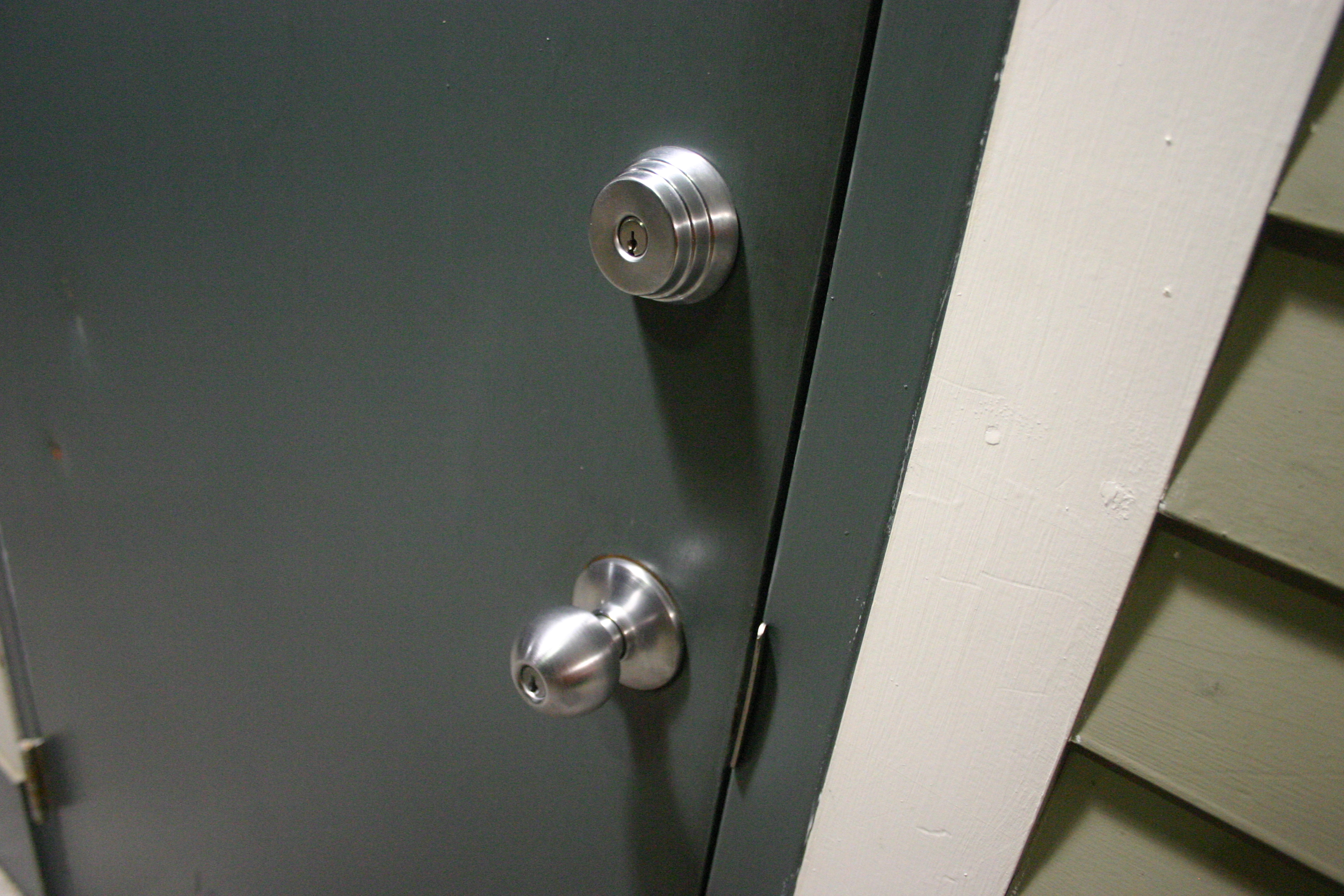
Door with two locks, one in the doorknob and a separate deadbolt

A deadbolt or deadlock is a type of lock morticed into a wooden door where a bolt is thrown into the door frame, using a key from either side, to secure the door. It is distinct from a spring bolt lock because a deadbolt can only be opened by a key or handle. The more common spring bolt lock uses a spring to hold the bolt in place, allowing retraction by applying force to the bolt itself. A deadbolt can therefore make a door more resistant to entry without the correct key, as well as make the door more resistant to forced entry. A deadbolt is often used to complement a spring-bolt lock on an entry door to a building.

== Common types ==
A deadlock, if it is cylinder operated, may be either single cylinder or double cylinder. A single cylinder deadlock will accept a key on one side of the lock, but is operated by a twist knob on the other side. Double cylinder locks will accept a key on both sides and therefore do not require (and often do not have) any twist knob. This prevents unwanted unlocking of the door by forced access to the interior twist knob (via a nearby window, for example). Double cylinder locks are sometimes banned from areas because they can be difficult to open from the inside and violate fire safety regulations. Some lock manufacturers also have a "lockable" knob: a key is always needed on one side (usually external), and a twist knob can be used on the other (internal), unless a button has been pressed, in which case a key is also needed on the internal side.

A variant of the standard deadbolt is the vertical deadbolt, invented by Samuel Segal. Vertical deadbolts resist jimmying, in which an intruder inserts a crowbar between the door and the jamb and attempts to prise the bolt out of the door.

Other types of deadbolts include:

- Classroom-function (thumb-turn only unlocks door)
- Exit-only function (no external cylinder)
- Push-button deadbolt (mechanical or electrical)
- Single cylinder with removable thumb-turn

== Safety ==
The double cylinder design raises a safety issue. In the event of a fire, occupants will be prevented from escaping through double-cylinder locked doors unless the correct key is used. This is an avoidable cause of death in house fires. The risk can be mitigated by locking the deadlock only when there are no occupants inside the building, or leaving the key near the keyhole. Some fire departments suggest putting the key on a small nail or screw near the door at floor level, since the cleanest air is at floor level and one may be crawling to get to the exit, thus placing the key where it is easiest to find.

Note that single cylinder dead locks (with an unlocked twist mechanism on the inside of the door) do not have this problem, and therefore are most commonly used on fire exits. Some areas have fire safety codes that do not allow a locked exit.

== See also ==
- Door security
- Lock bumping
