= Rotary =

Rotary may refer to:

== Science, engineering and technology ==
- Rotary motion
- Rotary dial, a rotating telephone dial
- Rotary engine (disambiguation), multiple types of engines called "rotary"
- Rotary latch
- Rotary milking shed, a type of milking shed used in the dairy industry
- Rotary snowplow, one type of railroad snowplow used especially for deep snow removal
- Rotary system, a type of pre-electronic telephone switch
- Rotary table (drilling rig), a device used to apply directional force to a drill string
- Rotary tiller, a motorised cultivator
- Rotary woofer, a type of loudspeaker capable of producing very low frequency sound
- Rotary wing aircraft

== Organisations and enterprises ==
- Rotary International, or Rotary Club, an international service organization founded in the United States
  - Rotary Foundation, non-profit foundation of Rotary International
  - Rotary Scholarships, scholarships offered by the organization
- Rotary Jaipur Limb Project, a U.K. charity which provides prosthetic limbs to amputees in India and several African countries
- Rotary Watches, a Swiss watchmaker

== Other uses ==
- Rotary (intersection) or roundabout, a circular roadway intersection
- "The Rotary", a song by Andy Partridge from Take Away / The Lure of Salvage
