= Latch =

Mechanical fastener

Opening a captured draw bolt-style latch

A latch or catch (called sneck in Northern England and Scotland) is a type of mechanical fastener that joins two or more objects or surfaces while allowing for their regular separation. A latch typically engages another piece of hardware on the other mounting surface. Depending upon the type and design of the latch, this engaged bit of hardware may be known as a keeper or strike.

A latch is not the same as the locking mechanism of a door or window, although often they are found together in the same product.

Latches range in complexity from flexible one-piece flat springs of metal or plastic, such as are used to keep blow molded plastic power tool cases closed, to multi-point cammed latches used to keep large doors closed.

== Common types ==
=== Deadbolt latch ===
A deadbolt latch is a single-throw bolt. The bolt can be engaged in its strike plate only after the door is closed. The locking mechanism typically prevents the bolt from being retracted by force.

=== Spring latches ===
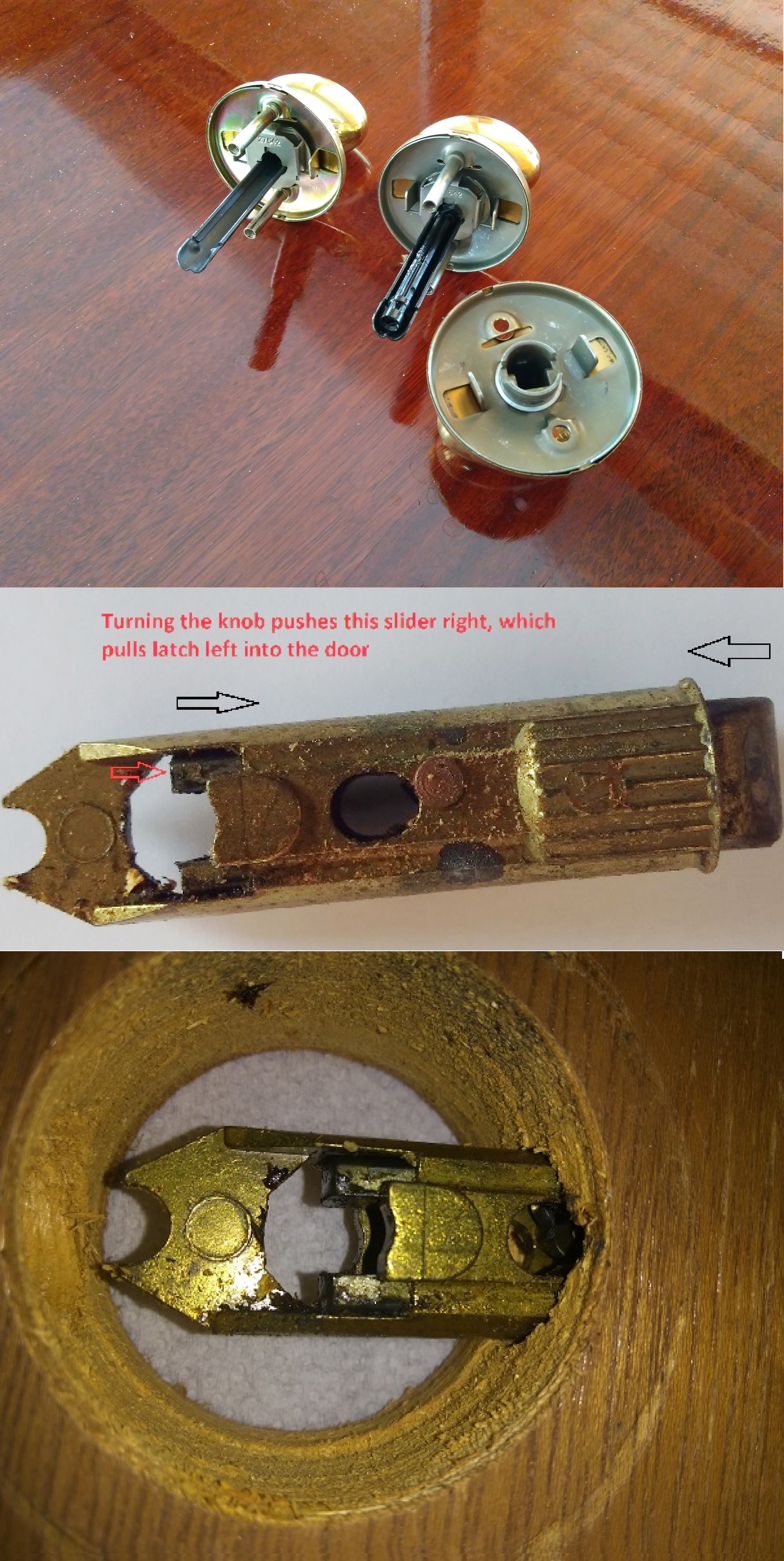
Knob has crescent-shaped bar which pulls back latch bolt when turned. Version on upper right has a lock; version on upper left does not. Kwikset uses this shape. Other companies have square or D-shaped bars.

- A latch bolt is an extremely common latch type, typically part of a lockset. It is a spring-loaded bolt with an angled edge. When the door is pushed closed, the angled edge of the latch bolt engages with the lip of the strike plate; a spring allows the bolt to retract. Once the door is fully closed, the bolt automatically extends into the strike plate, holding the door closed. The latch bolt is disengaged (retracted) typically when the user turns the door handle, which via the lockset's mechanism, manually retracts the latch bolt, allowing the door to open.
- A deadlocking latch bolt (deadlatch) is an elaboration on the latch bolt which includes a guardbolt to prevent "shimming" or "jimmying" of the latch bolt. When the door is closed, the latch bolt and guardbolt are retracted together, and the door closes normally, with the latch bolt entering the strike plate. The strike plate, however, holds the guardbolt in its depressed position: a mechanism within the lockset holds the latch bolt in the projected position. This arrangement prevents the latch bolt from being depressed through the use of a credit card or some other tool, which would lead to unauthorized entry.
- A draw latch is a two-part latch where one side has an arm that can clasp to the other half, and as it closes the clasp pulls the two parts together. It is frequently used on tool boxes, chests, crates, and windows and does not need to be fully closed to secure both halves.
- A spring bolt lock (or night latch) is a locking mechanism used with a latch bolt

=== Slam latch ===
A slam latch uses a spring and is activated by the shutting or slamming of a door. Like all latches, a slam latch is a mechanism to hold a door closed. The slam latch derives its name from its ability to slam doors and drawers shut without damaging the latch. A slam latch is rugged and ideal for industrial, agricultural and construction applications.

=== Cam lock ===
A cam lock is a type of latch consisting of a base and a cam. The base is where the key or tool is used to rotate the cam, which is what does the latching. Cams can be straight or offset; offset cams are reversible. Commonly found on garage cabinets, file cabinets, tool chests, and other locations where privacy and security is needed.

==== Electronic cam lock ====
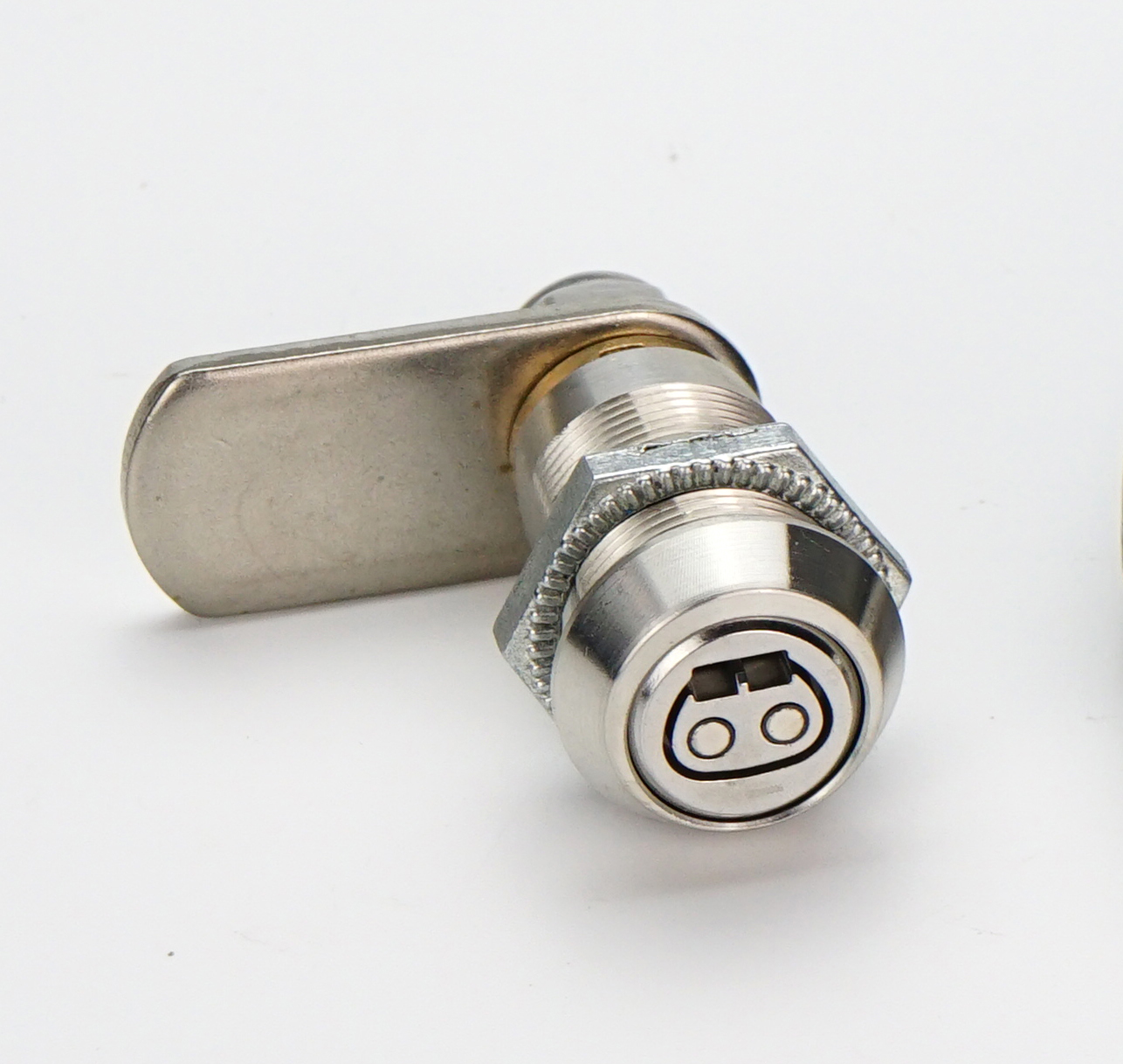
Electronic cam lock

Electronic cam locks are an alternative to mechanical cam locks. The appearance of the electronic cam lock is similar to the mechanical cam lock, but it is different in the lock cylinder.

The keyhole of a mechanical cam lock is usually the same as an ordinary padlock. A physical key is used to unlock the lock. The physical key has a notch or slot corresponding to the obstacle in the cam lock, allowing it to rotate freely in the lock.

Different from mechanical cam locks, electronic cam locks use an electronic key to unlock. The key needs to be programmed which contains the user, unlocking date, and time period. The electronic cam lock has no mechanical keyhole, only three metal contacts are retained. When unlocking, the three contacts on the head end of the electronic key are in contact with the three contacts on the electronic cam lock. At this time, the key will supply power to the electronic cam lock and read the ID number of the electronic cam lock for verification and match. If successful, the lock can be unlocked.

The emergence of electronic cam locks aims to improve the safety and functionality of traditional mechanical cam locks.

=== Suffolk latch ===
A Suffolk latch is a type of latch incorporating a simple thumb-actuated lever and commonly used to hold wooden gates and doors closed.

Comparison of Suffolk and Norfolk latches.

The Suffolk latch originated in the English county of Suffolk in the 16th century and stayed in common use until the 19th century. They have recently come back into favour, particularly in traditional homes and country cottages. They were common from the 17th century to around 1825, and their lack of a back plate made them different from the later, and neighbouring Norfolk latch (introduced 1800–1820). Both the Suffolk latch and Norfolk latch are thought to have been named by architectural draughtsman William Twopenny (1797–1873). Many of these plates found their way into America and other parts of the world.

=== Norfolk latch ===
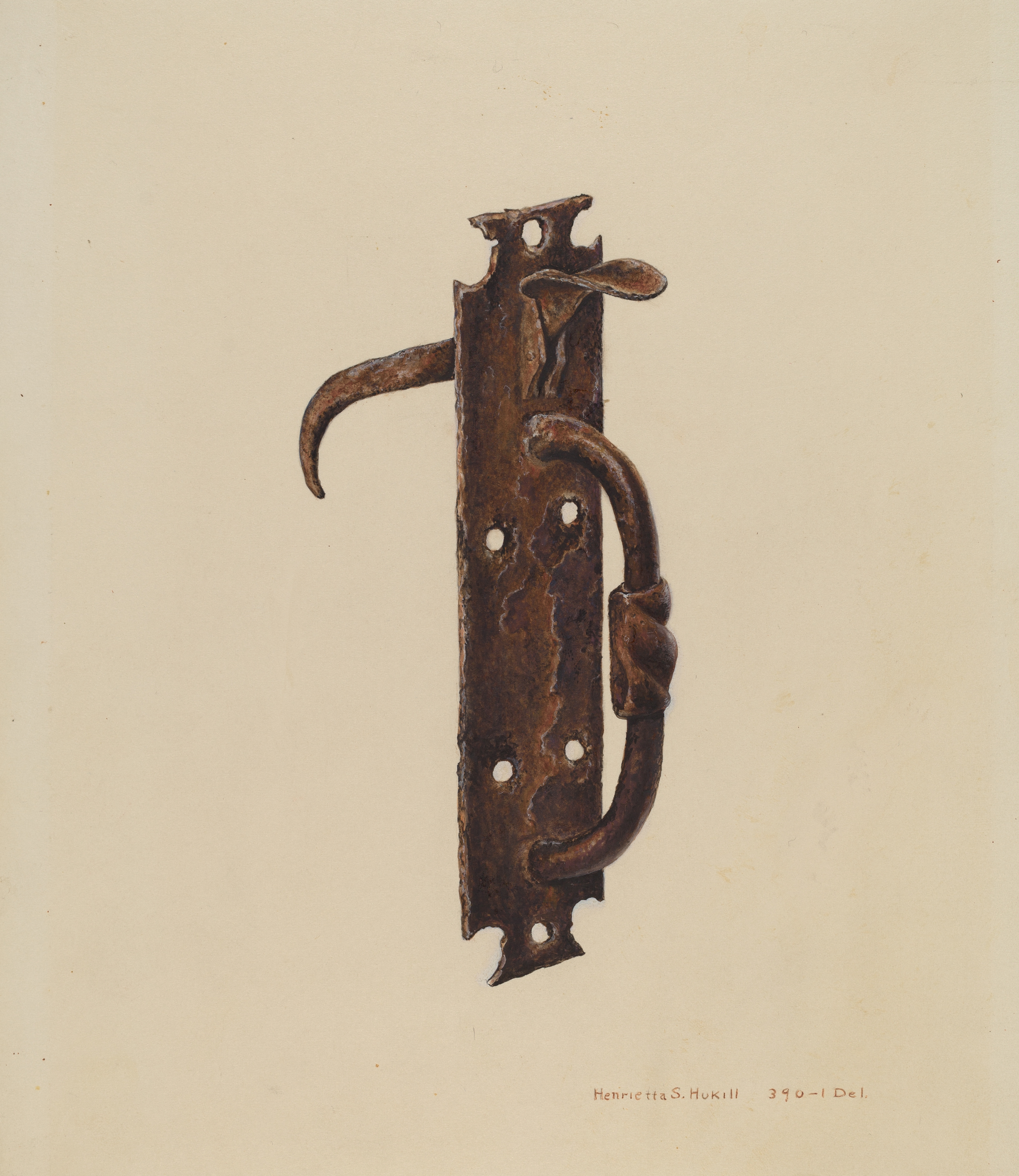
Norfolk latch, circa 1939

A Norfolk latch is a type of latch incorporating a simple thumb-actuated lever and commonly used to hold wooden gates and doors closed. In a Norfolk latch, the handle is fitted to a backplate independently of the thumb piece. Introduced around 1800–1820, Norfolk latches, originating in the English county of the same name, differ from the older Suffolk latch, which lacked a back plate to which the thumbpiece is attached.

=== Crossbar ===
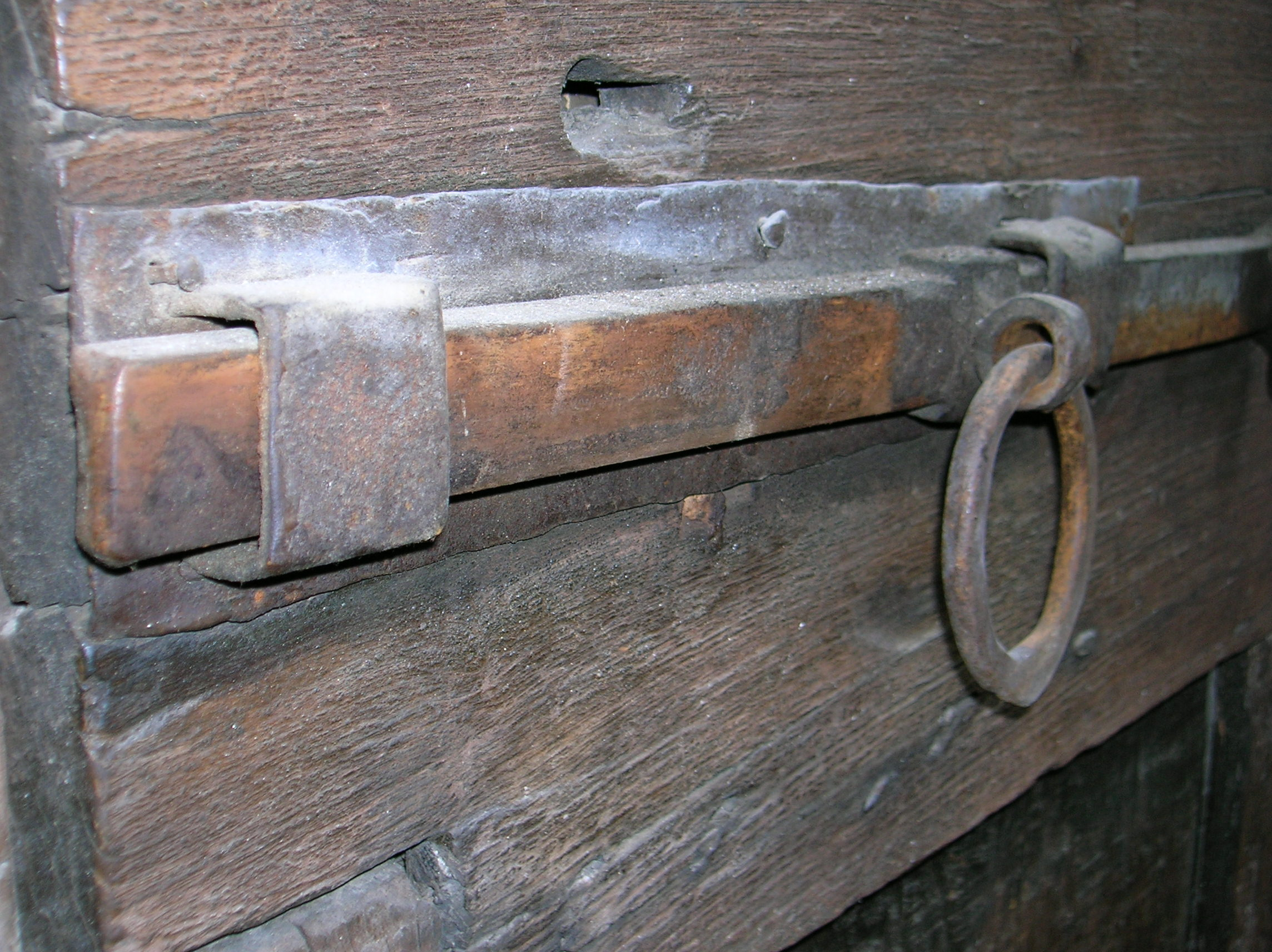
A wooden crossbar on a door

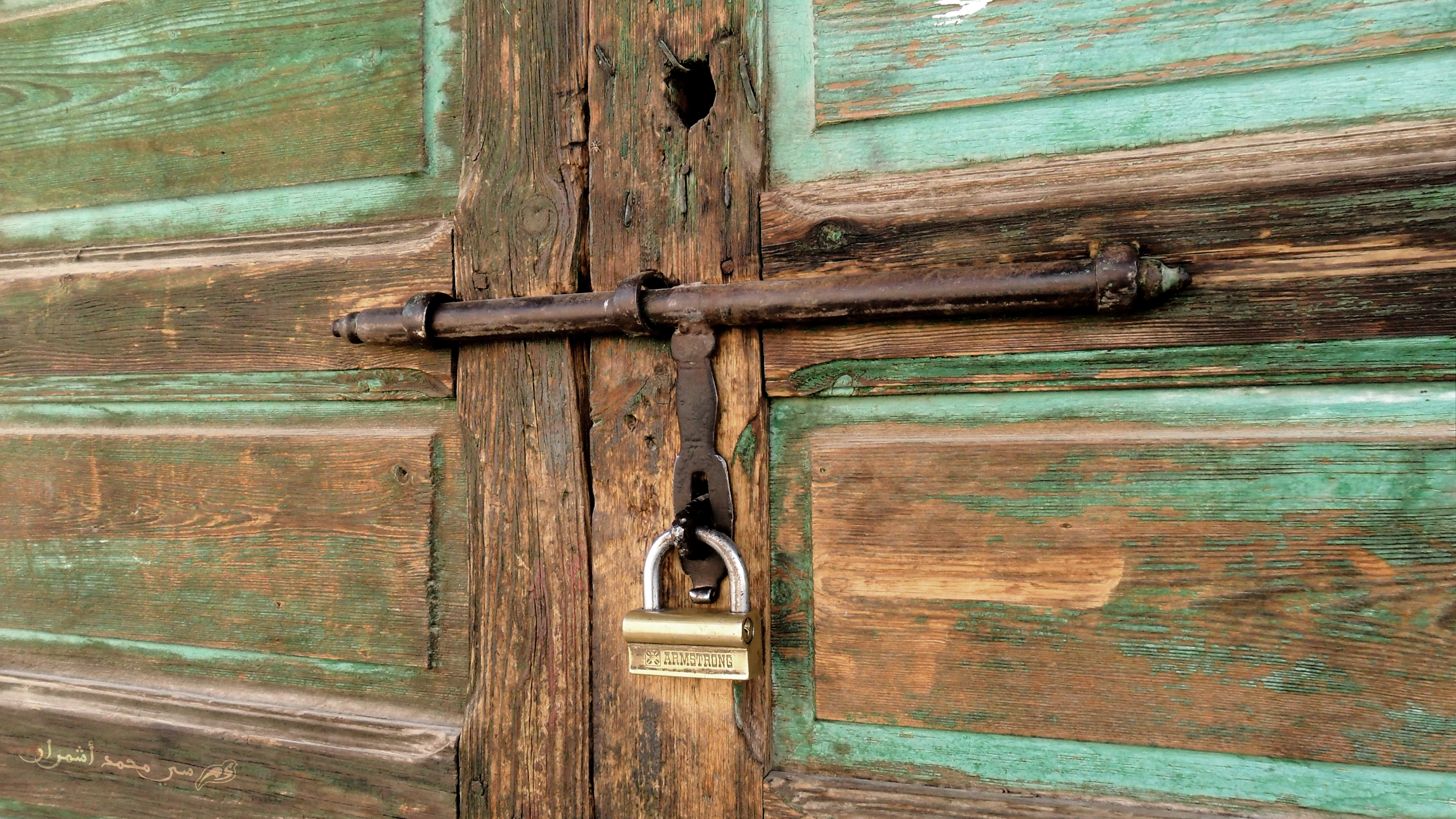
An aldrop latch, a form of draw bolt

A crossbar, sometimes called a bolt or draw bolt, is a historically common and simple means of barring a door. In its most primitive form it employs a plank or beam held by or placed onto open cleats on a door, which is shifted to be held fast by a corresponding cleat on an adjacent jamb.

A crossbar for double doors employs the same principle, but, in most cases, must be manually set in place and removed due to its width being greater than both doors.

A crossbar for a single jamb may be "captured" on the door by U-shaped bails, or anchored by a bolt on its inboard end and pivoted up and down into open cleats, making it a form of latch.

A "draw bolt" style closure adds a handle for sliding its bolt - the source of the term "bolting a door". A variant with a slot in the handle for dropping it over a staple to secure it with a lock is known as an aldrop. Most modern draw bolts are made of metal, and may be used to secure a door from the outside or the in.

=== Cabin hook ===
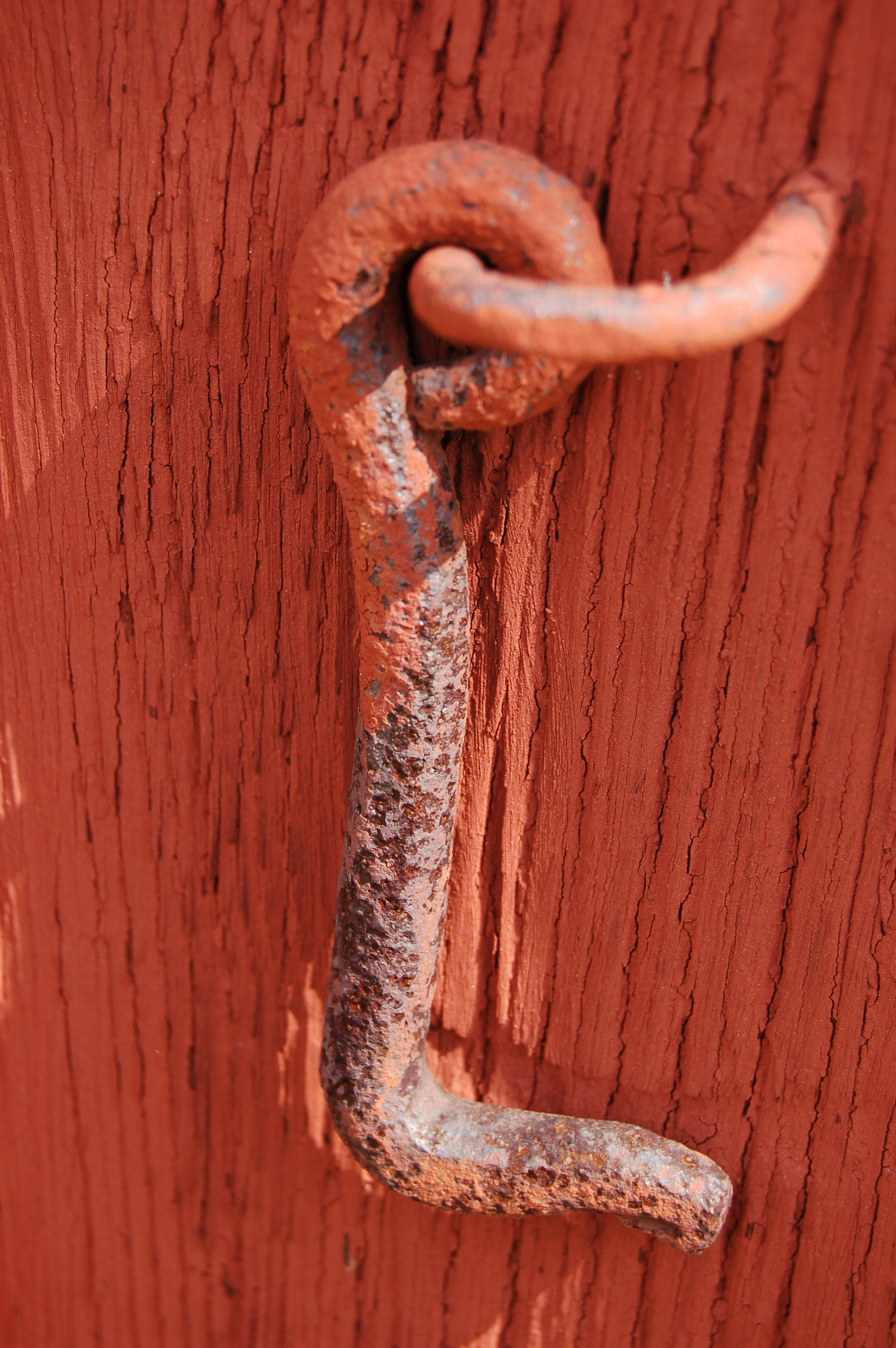
A cabin hook latch

A cabin hook is a hooked bar that engages into a staple. The bar is usually attached permanently to a ring or staple that is fixed with screws or nails to woodwork or a wall at the same level as the eye screw. The eye screw is usually screwed into the adjacent wall or onto the door itself. Used to hold a cupboard, door or gate open or shut.

A cabin hook is used in many situations to hold a door open, like on ships to prevent doors from swinging and banging against other woodwork as the ship moves due to wave action. This usage spread also to other domains, where a door was required to be held open or a self-closing device is used to close the door.

Many buildings are built with fire-resistant doors to separate different parts of buildings and to allow people to be protected from fire and smoke. When using a cabin hook in such a situation, one should keep in mind that a fire-resistant door is an expensive and heavy item, and it only works as a fire door if it is closed during a fire. To hold an often heavy fire door open simply, electromagnetic door holders are used that release when a building's fire alarm system is activated. As cabin hooks must be released manually, they are impractical for fire doors.

=== Toggle latch ===
Also named draw latch or draw catch. It has a claw or a loop that catches the strike plate (named catch plate in this case) when reaching a certain position.

=== Pawl ===
A pawl is a latch that will allow movement in one direction, but prevents return motion. It is commonly used in combination with a ratchet wheel.

== Applications ==
=== Architecture ===
A latch of some type is typically fitted to a door or window.

=== Weaponry ===
Many types of weaponry incorporate latches with designs unique to the weapon.

==== Firearms ====
Firearms require specialized latches used during loading and firing of the weapon.

A break-action firearm is one whose barrels are hinged and a latch is operated to release the two parts of the weapon to expose the breech and allow loading and unloading of ammunition. It is then closed and re-latched prior to firing. A separate operation may be required for the cocking and latching-open of a hammer to fire the new round. Break open actions are universal in double-barrelled shotguns, double-barrelled rifles and combination guns, and are also common in single shot rifles, pistols, and shotguns, and can also be found in flare guns, grenade launchers, air guns and some older revolver designs.

Several latch designs have been used for loading revolvers. In a top-break revolver, the frame is hinged at the bottom front of the cylinder. The frame is in two parts, held together by a latch on the top rear of the cylinder. For a swing out cylinder, the cylinder is mounted on a pivot that is coaxial with the chambers, and the cylinder swings out and down. Some designs, such as the Ruger Super Redhawk or the Taurus Raging Bull, use a latches at the front and rear of the cylinder to provide a secure bond between cylinder and frame.

To fire a revolver, generally the hammer is first manually cocked and latched into place. The trigger, when pulled, releases the hammer, which fires the round in the chamber.

==== Knives ====
Various types of knives with folding or retractable blades rely on latches for their function. A switchblade uses an internal spring to produce the blade which is held in place by a button-activated latch. Likewise a ballistic knife uses a strong latch to restrain a powerful spring from firing the blade as a projectile until triggered by opening the latch. A gravity knife relies on a latch to hold the folding blade in an open position once released. A butterfly knife uses a single latch to hold the folding blade both open and closed, depending on the position of the handles; by rotating 180 degrees the same latch can be used in either configuration. Butterfly knife latches have numerous variations, including magnetic variants and some which can be opened via a spring when the handles are squeezed together.

Utility knives also often use a latch to hold a folding knife both open and closed. This allows it to be locked in orientation to the handle when in use, but also safely stowed otherwise. To open a knife of this type may require significantly more force than the weapons variety as an added safety feature.

==== Other ====
Crossbows incorporate a type of latch to hold the drawn bowstring prior to firing.

=== Automobiles ===
Automobiles incorporate numerous special-purpose latches as components of the doors, hood/bonnet, trunk/boot door, seat belts, etc.

On passenger cars, a hood may be held down by a concealed latch. On race cars or cars with aftermarket hoods (that do not use the factory latch system) the hood may be held down by hood pins.

The term Nader bolt is a nickname for the bolt on vehicles that allows a hinged door to remain safely latched and closed. It is named after consumer rights advocate and politician Ralph Nader, who in 1965 released the book Unsafe at Any Speed which claimed that American cars were fundamentally flawed with respect to operator safety.

Latches in seatbelts typically fasten the belt which constrains the occupant to the body of the car. Particularly in rear seats slightly different latches may be used for each seat in order to prevent adjacent seatbelts from being attached to the wrong point. Inertial seatbelt release is a potential circumstance where, in a collision, the seatbelt latch can unintentionally come loose leading to potential injury of the passenger. An additional risk of seatbelt latches is that in some cases the occupant may believe the latch is secure (e.g., by hearing a characteristic click) when in fact it is not.

A parking pawl is a device that latches the transmission on automatic vehicles when put in 'park'.

=== Bakeware ===
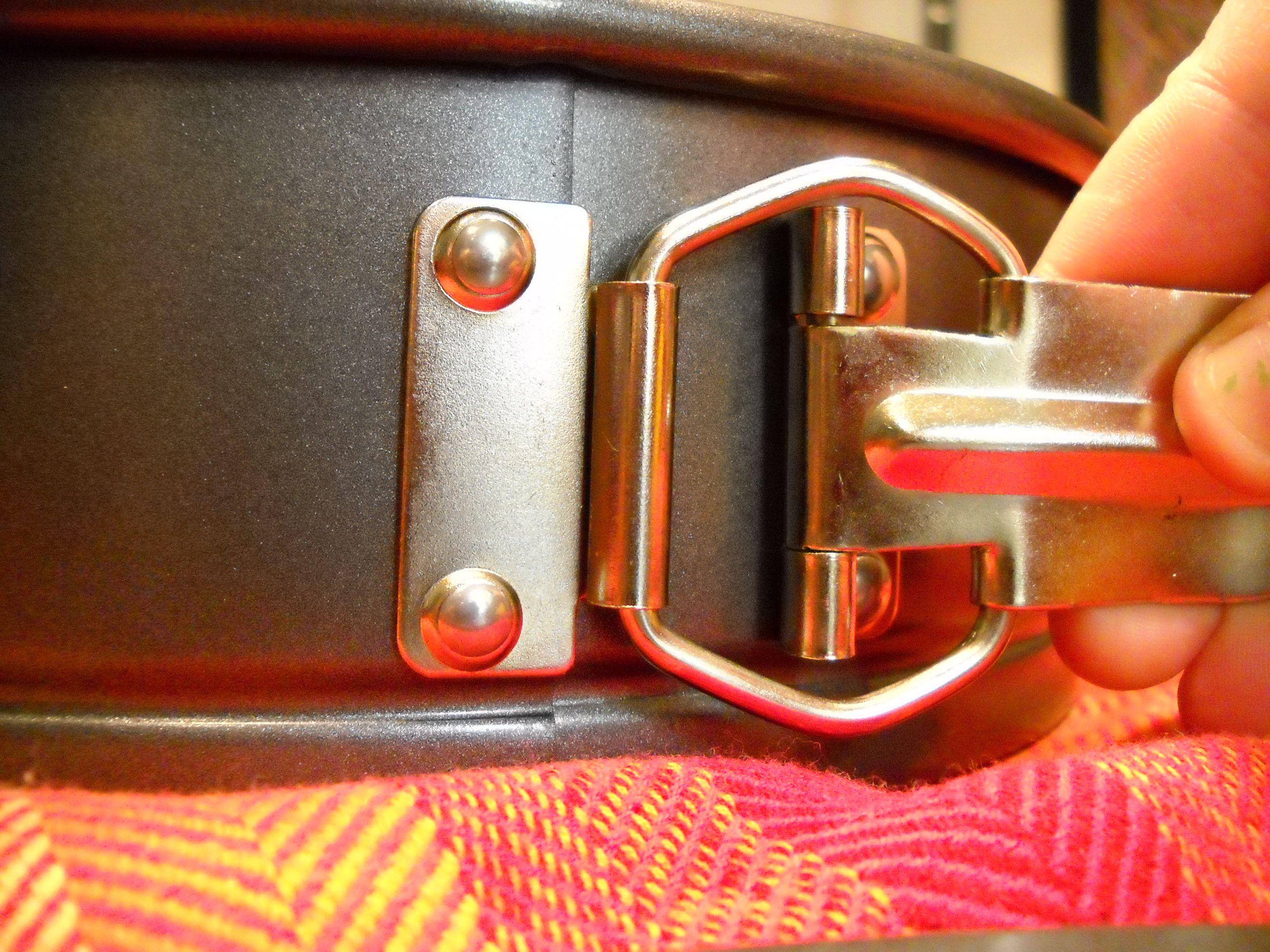
Close-up of springform pan

A spring latch (in this case an over-center-latch) is used to hold the walls of a springform pan in place.

== See also ==
- Door chain
- Electric strike
- Single-point locking
- Snib
