= Doorstop =

Device to prevent door from moving, or opening too far

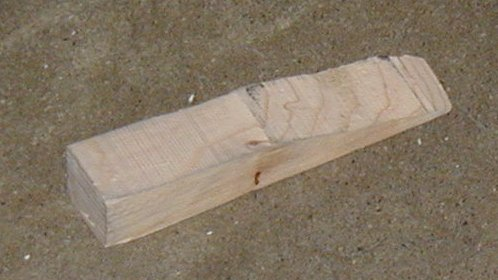
A handmade wooden doorstop

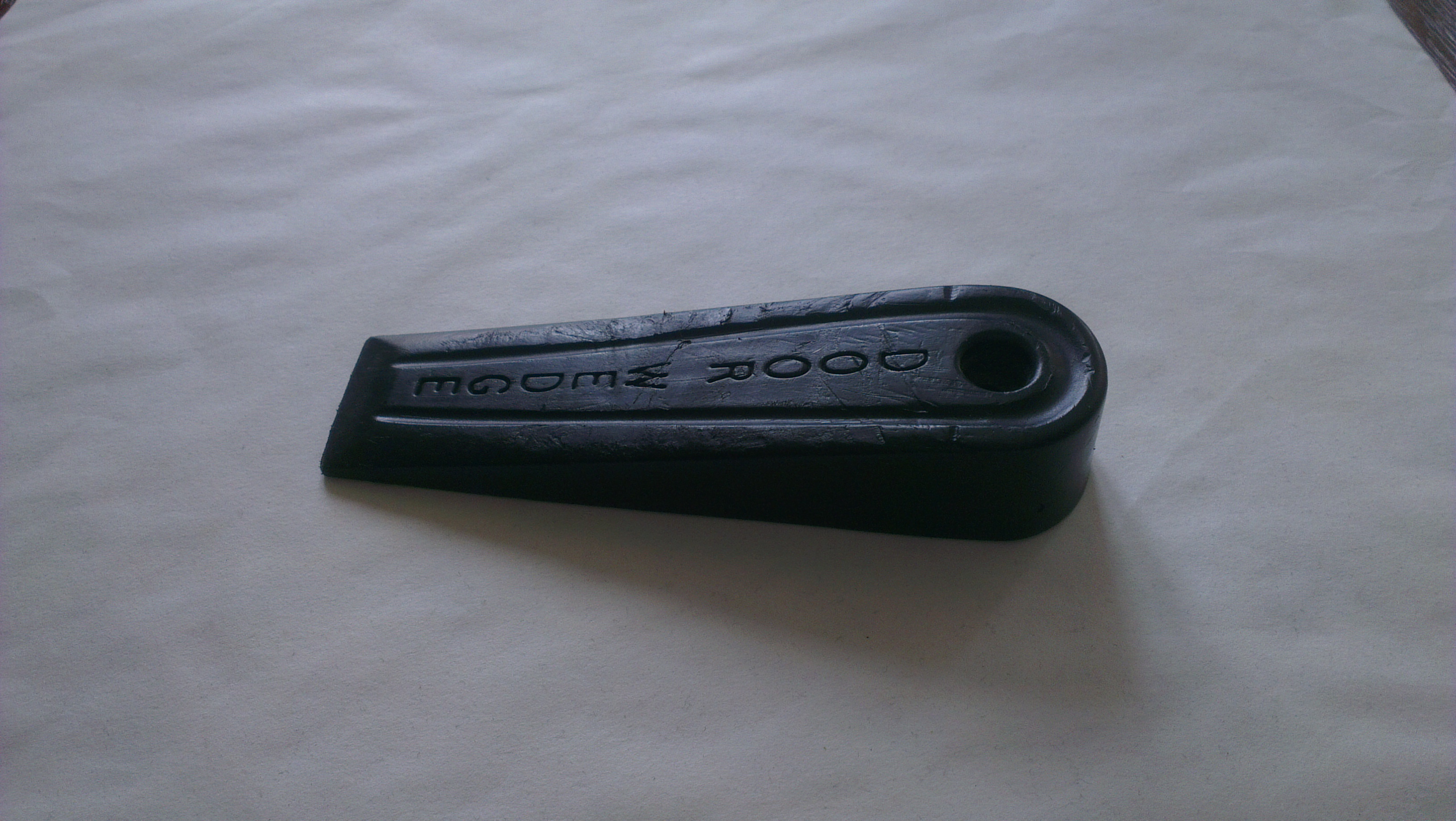
A manufactured black rubber doorstop

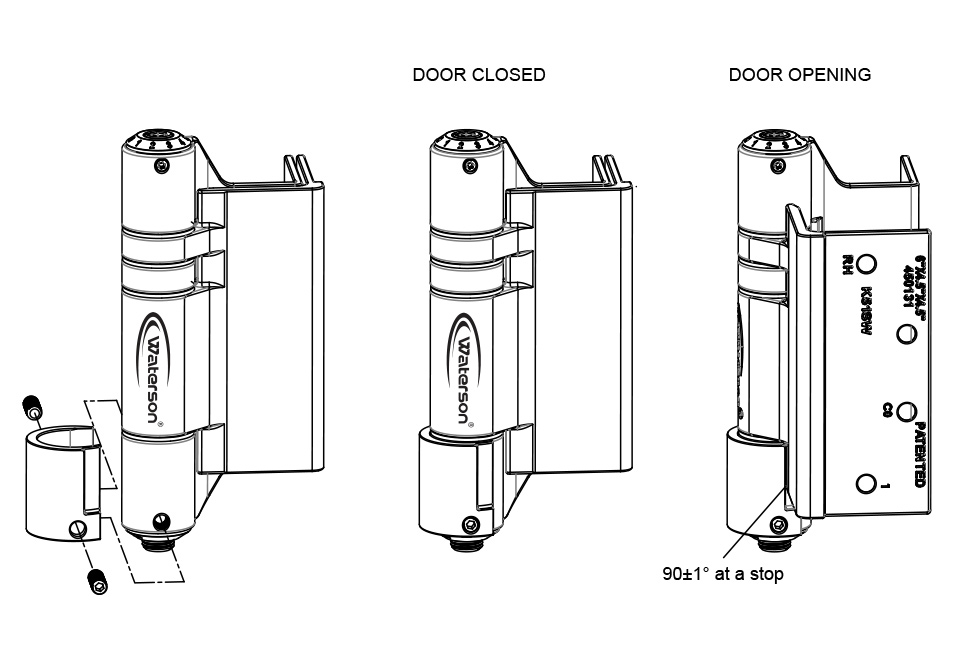
An integrated doorstop

A doorstop (also door stopper, door stop, door wedge, door check) is a device that holds a door open or closed, or that limits its swing.

It may be a wedge or heavy object on the floor, a bumper attached to a wall or floor, part of the hinge or door closer, part of the door frame, or a bracket attached to the door frame.

== History ==
Purpose-made gravity doorstops became popular in around 1775 after the rising-butt hinge, which closes doors automatically, was introduced. These were typically made of painted cast iron, often modeled on the head or bust of a famous person, or on an animal.

They become widely manufactured in the early 19th century, and by the mid 19th century, manufacturing had primarily moved to the United States. They are now collectors' items.

Rubber doorstops are documented in 1869, although this may be referring to weatherstripping.

== Usage ==
=== Holding doors open ===
A door may be stopped by a doorstop which is simply a heavy solid object, such as a brick, placed in the path of the door. These stops are predominantly improvised. Historically, lead bricks have been popular choices when available.

Another method is to use a doorstop which is a small wedge of wood, rubber, fabric, plastic, cotton or another material. Manufactured wedges of these materials are commonly available. The wedge is kicked into position and the downward force of the door, now jammed upwards onto the doorstop, provides enough static friction to keep it motionless.

A third strategy is to equip the door itself with a stopping mechanism. In this case, a short metal bar capped with rubber, or another high-friction material, is attached to a hinge near the bottom of the door opposite the door hinge and on the side of the door which is in the direction that it closes. When the door is to be kept open, the bar is swung down so that the rubber end touches the floor. In this configuration, further movement of the door towards being closed increases the force on the rubber end, thereby increasing the frictional force which opposes the movement. When the door is to be closed, the stop is released by pushing the door slightly more open, which releases the stop and allows it to be flipped upwards. A newer version of equipping the door with the stopping mechanism is to attach a magnet to the bottom or top of the door on the side which opens outward, which then latches onto another magnet or magnetic material on the wall or a small hub on the floor. The magnet must be strong enough to hold the weight of the door, but weak enough to be easily detached from the wall or hub.

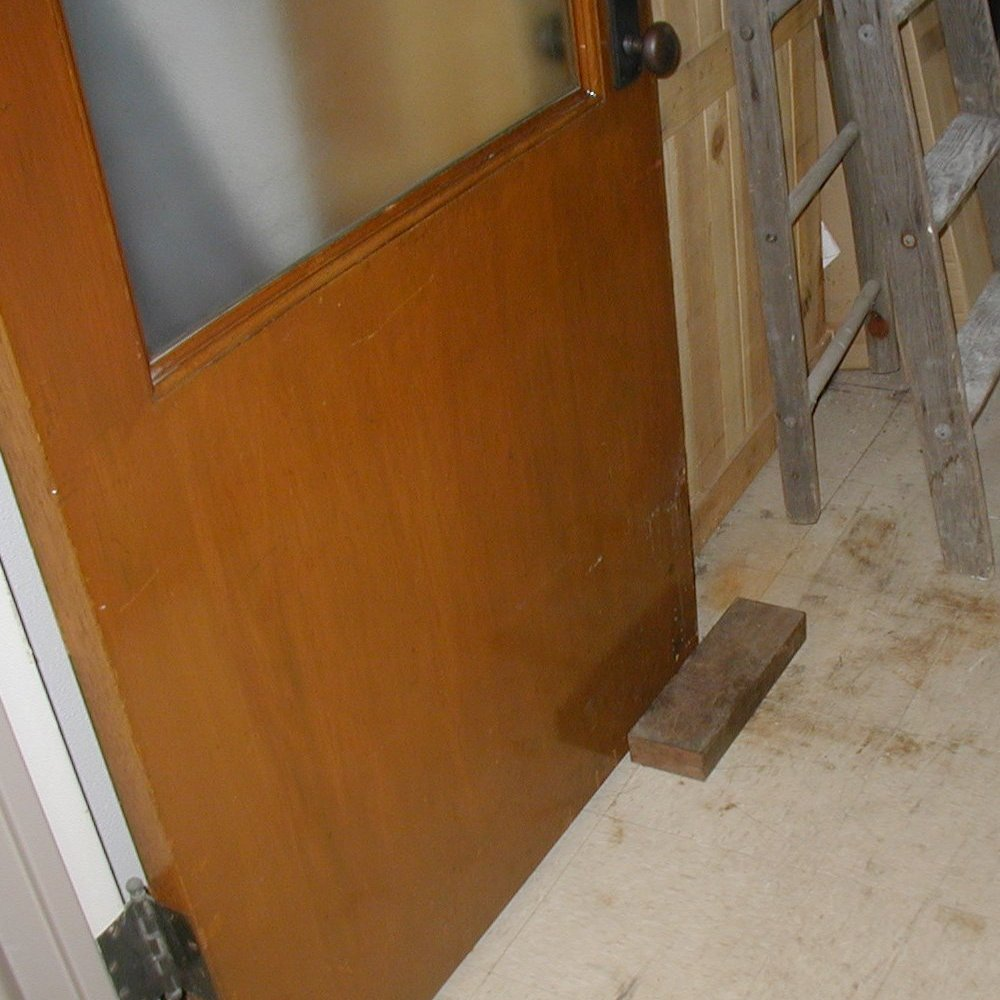
A metal brick used as a doorstop

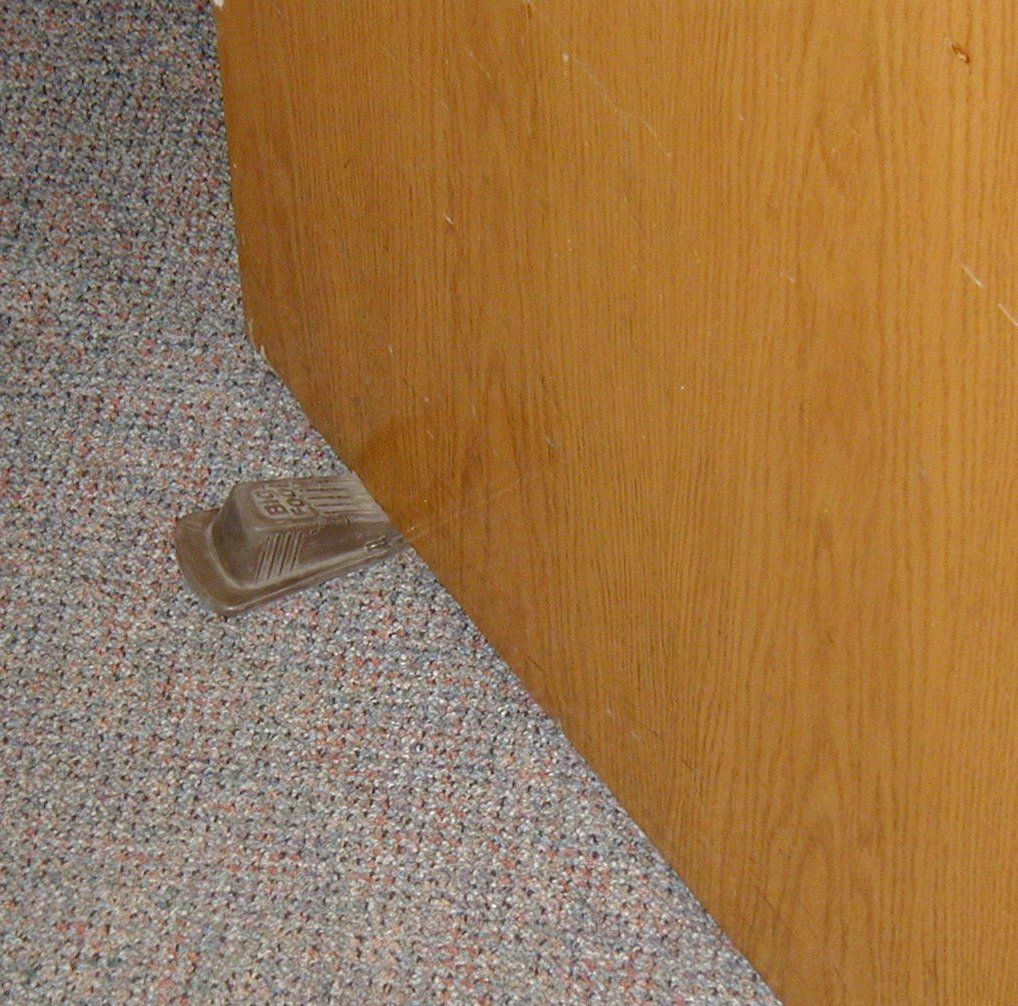
A commercially available rubber doorstop

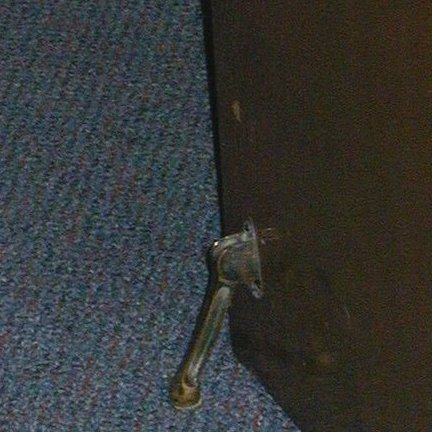
A door mounted doorstop

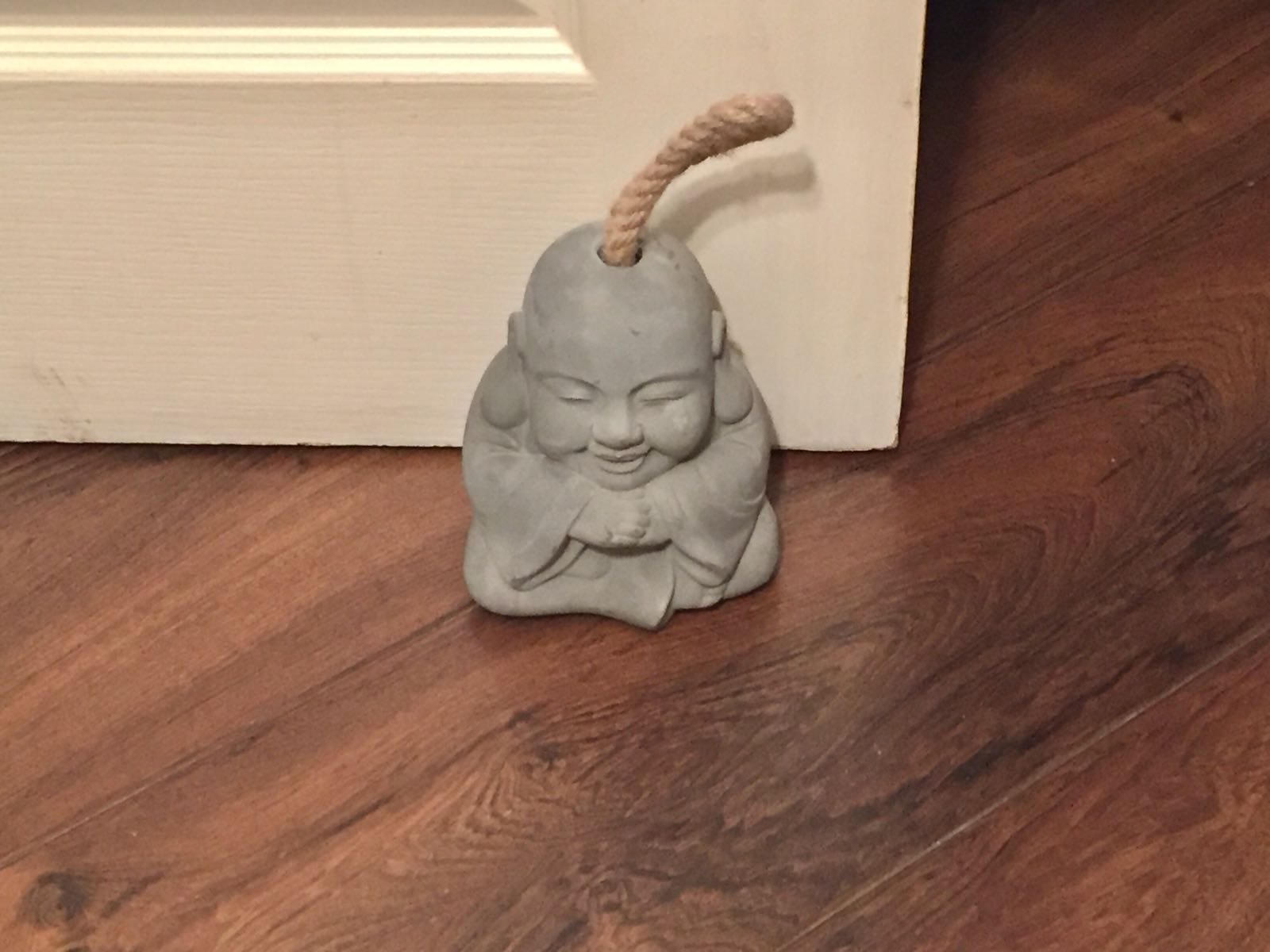
A decorative concrete doorstop

=== Preventing damage by doors ===
Another type of doorstop is used to prevent doors from opening too far and damaging nearby walls. In this case a rubber cylinder or dome—or a rod or block of rubber-tipped metal, wood or plastic—is screwed into the wall, molding or the floor in the path of the door. If it is attached to the wall, it may be either a few inches above the ground, or at such a height as to meet the doorknob. A short, wall-attached doorstop, usually a rubber dome or cylinder, is sometimes called a wall bumper. Rigid metal springs (also tipped with rubber or plastic) are used to absorb and more widely distribute the kinetic energy of the door swinging.

On occasion, stops are used that are fitted at the midpoint of the door, as part of the central door-hinge. Such stops are known as a "hinge stops" or "hinge pin" doorstops and are often used to prevent damage to baseboard molding.

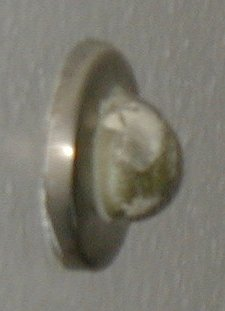
A doorknob-blocking wall mounted doorstop, also called a "wall bumper"

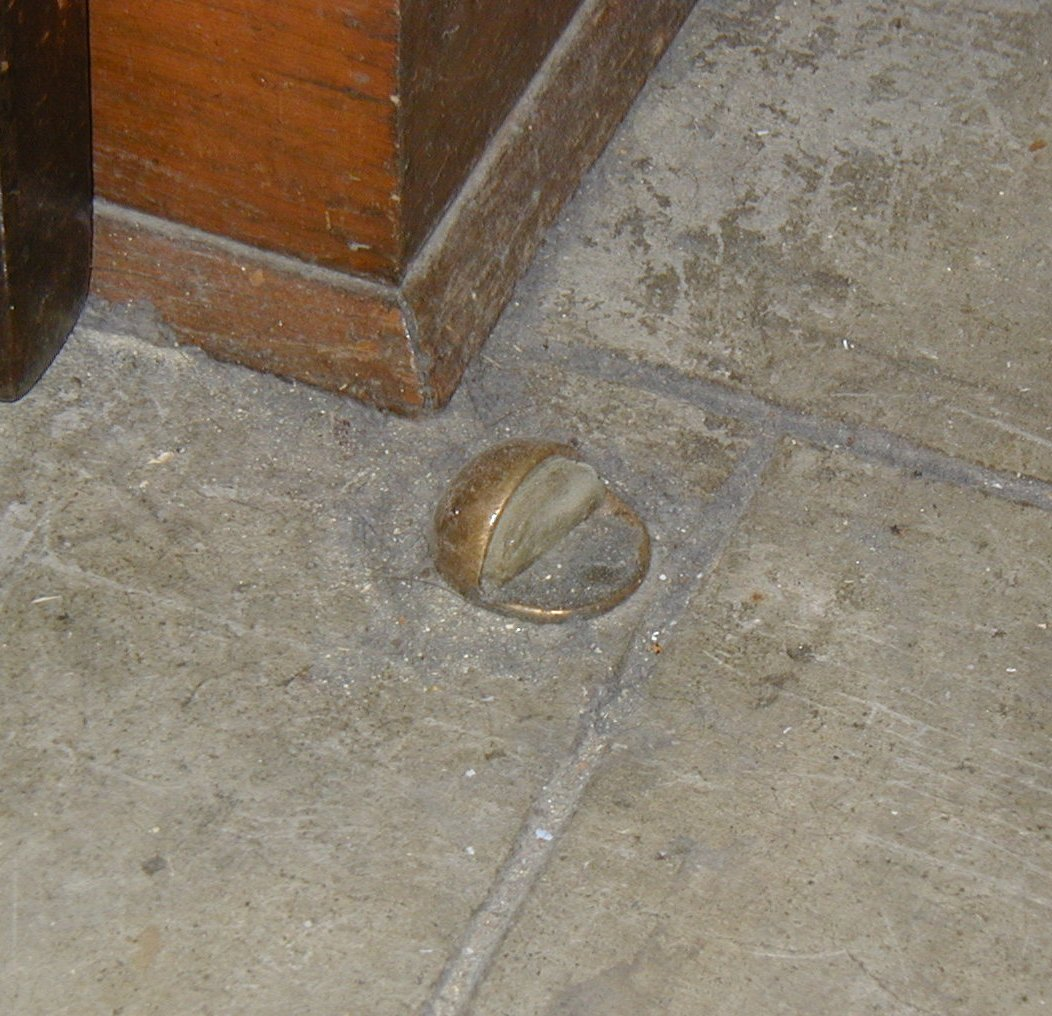
A floor mounted doorstop

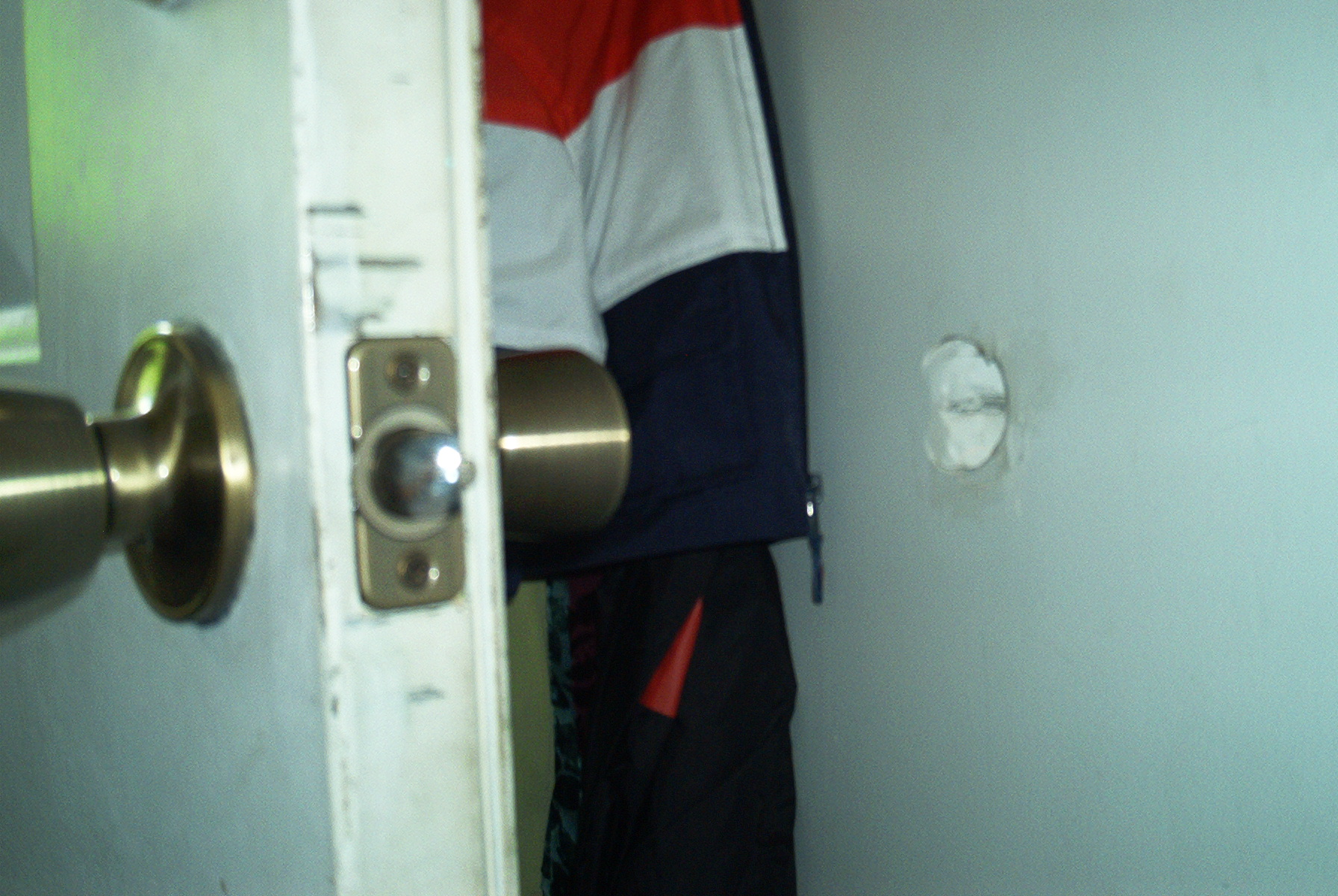
The consequences of lacking a doorstop

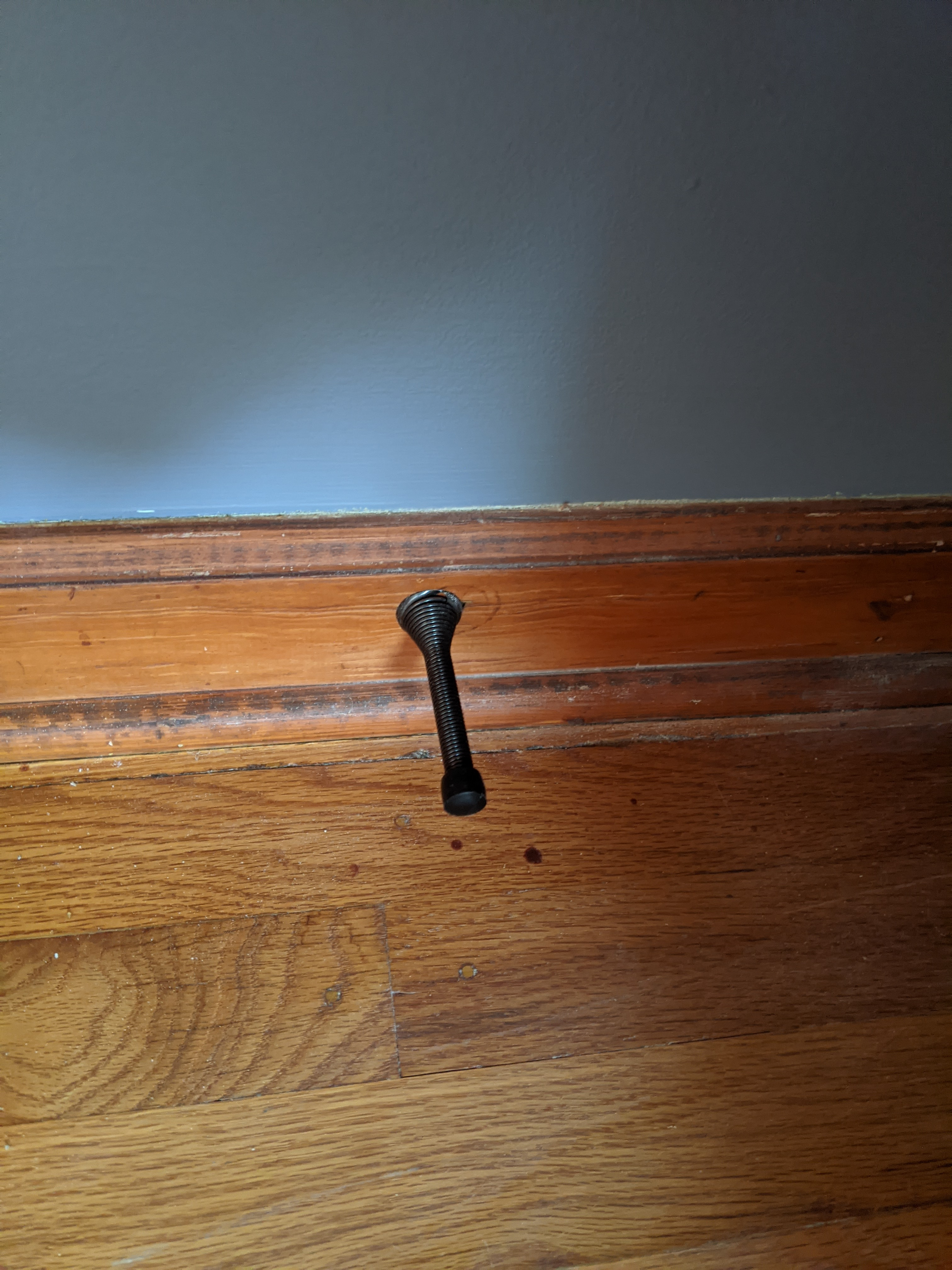
Rigid metal spring doorstop in solid baseboard molding

=== Holding doors closed ===
In his 1906 book The Right Way to Do Wrong, Harry Houdini recommends the use of a doorstop wedge to prevent a door from being pushed open from the outside, to deter burglars at night.

== See also ==
- Electromagnetic door holder
