= Vision panel =

Small window in a door or adjacent wall

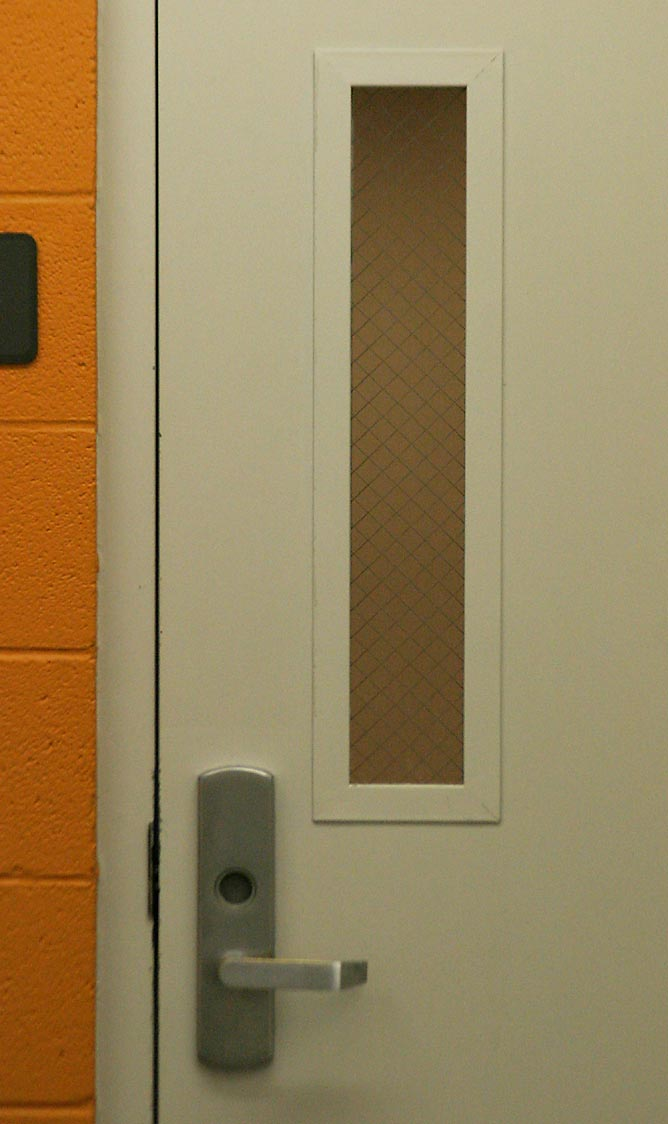
Fire-resistance rated door, with wire mesh glass vision panel

A vision panel is a small window in a door which allows people to look through without opening the door. Vision panels are sometimes in walls, generally adjacent to a door.

These have implications in safety, primarily to avoid opening doors on a person coming the other way, but also in case of fire to avoid opening a door onto a fire.

They should be used on doors which open both ways, and doors which subdivide corridors.

In a fire door it is important that the vision panel is rated at the same level as the fire door requirements, otherwise the vision panel will fail before the rest of the door.

The height of the panel needs to take into consideration the viewing level of users, for example those in wheelchairs or children. As a consequence panels are often long, or, in the case of wall viewing panels, floor to ceiling.

The UK Building regulations say:

C. Unless it can be argued otherwise in the Access Statement, e.g. for reasons of security, door leaves, and side panels wider than 450mm, have vision panels towards the leading edge of the door whose vertical dimensions include at least the minimum zone, or zones, of visibility between 500mm and 1500mm from the floor, if necessary interrupted between 800mm and 1150mm above the floor, e.g. to accommodate an intermediate horizontal rail

— Document M, Section M, para 2.13, C

== See also ==
- Door furniture
