= Rotary Jaipur Limb Project =

The Rotary Jaipur Limb Project (RJLP) is a registered charitable organisation located in the United Kingdom. Its mission is to raise funds and build workshops to provide the Jaipur Foot to needy patients who have undergone below-the-knee amputations as a result of accident, disease, or in cases of congenital defects.

== History ==
In 1984, two Rotary volunteers, the late Peter Betteridge from the Rotary Club of Godalming, RI District 1250, and his wife Jessamine, visited the workshops of Bhagwan Mahaveer Viklang Sahayata Samiti (BMVSS) in Jaipur, India, a charitable organisation which runs permanent limb centres and limb camps throughout India. Upon their return to the U.K., they, together with other Rotarians, began to raise funds to help support limb camps in India. The project expanded into creating RJLP's first permanent limb centres in Kammam, India and Nairobi, Kenya in 1990. In 1994, RJLP was registered as a recognised charity.

== Activities ==
Over the years, RJLP has financed limb camps or established permanent limb centres in Bangladesh, Benin, Congo (Democratic Republic,) Ethiopia, The Gambia, Ghana, Haiti, Honduras, India, Kenya, Rwanda, Sri Lanka, Nepal, Tanzania, Uganda, Zimbabwe and Caribbean countries. It has provided an estimated 50,000 prosthetic limbs in India and 30,000 in Africa, as well as crutches and wheelchairs. The average cost of a Jaipur limb in India is approximately £70 or US$95 (as of 2023) and it is provided at no cost to the recipient.
