= EN 16034 =

EN 16034:2014
- EN standard
- Reference: EN 16034:2014
- Type: Product standard
- Status: Published 30 April 2015
- Title: Pedestrian doorsets, industrial, commercial, garage doors and openable windows - Product standard, performance characteristics - Fire resisting and/or smoke control characteristics
- Committee: CEN/TC 33
- Work Item: 00033473
- Directives: 305/2011
- Mandate: M/101
- Citation in OJEU: 305/2011 (C 226, 2015-07-10)
- CE marking: Only in combination with either: EN 14351-1; prEN 14351-2; EN 13241-1; EN 16361
- Normative reference: EN 1125; EN 1154; EN 1155; EN 1158; EN 1191; EN 12209; EN 12605; EN 13501-2; EN 13637; EN 14637; EN 14846; EN 1634-1; EN 1634-3; EN 1670; EN 179; EN 1935; prEN 15685; prEN 15887

EN 16034 is a set of European standards which specify the technical performance characteristics for fire resistant and smoke control products, such as fire doors. Compliance with this standard requires to fulfill the requirements of the Construction Product Regulation for construction products (short CPR).

The primary purpose of the CPR is to remove technical barriers to trade for product manufacturers within the Internal market through the development and adoption of common European technical specifications.

Product manufacturers can sell their products throughout Europe by complying with a single common specification recognised and accepted by all Member States, rather than having to test and comply with different national standards in each of them.

EN 16034 shall be implemented on a national level by national standardization bodies.

Products which are covered by EN 16034 have to be CE marked when placed on the market. CE marking enables free trade within all Member States.

== History ==
In 1994 the European Commission has invited the European Standardization bodies CEN and CENELEC to draw up a common European standard for fire and smoke proof doors. In 2015 the final version has been published under the standard code EN 16034 on the Official Journal of the European Union.

== Scope ==
Fire rated hinged steel door with panic bar

Fire rated vertically sliding gate, fire rated swing door and fire rated roller shutter.

Fire rated horizontally sliding gate.

This European Standard identifies safety and performance requirements applicable to all fire resisting and/or smoke control products intended to be used in fire and/or smoke compartmentation and/or escape routes, which are either:

- industrial, commercial and/or garage doorsets
- rolling shutters or operable fabric curtains
- pedestrian doorsets and/or openable windows and/or inspection hatches which are hinged or sliding

== Testing and classification ==
All characteristics covered by this standard shall be determined with tests performed by an independent third party (Notified Test Body) under the responsibility of a Notified Product Certification Body responsible for the interpretation and classification of the obtained test results.

=== Factory Production Control (FPC) ===
After the successful testing and assessment of the product the Notified Product Certification Body inspects the manufacturing plant (Initial inspection) and assesses the Factory Production Control system (i.e. ISO or similar). The manufacturer is furthermore responsible for testing further samples taken directly from the manufacturing plant to keep and maintain his "Certificate of Constancy of Performance" valid and to be able to continue to CE mark his products.

=== Permitted wall types ===
The EN standard introduces the concept of standard supporting constructions (essentially wall types). These are the constructions into which the test specimen is allowed to be built. The available standard supporting constructions are:

- High density rigid construction: Blockwork, masonry or homogeneous concrete wall
- Low density rigid construction: Aerated concrete block wall
- Flexible construction: Lightweight plasterboard faced steel stud partition

== See also ==
- List of EN standards
- European Committee for Standardization
- Fire test
- UL Safety Organisation
- NFPA National Fire Protection Association
