= Rotary engine (disambiguation) =

A rotary engine is a type of internal combustion piston engine used in some early aircraft, motorcycles, and cars. Almost the entire engine rotates about a fixed crankshaft.

Rotary engine may also refer to:

- Pistonless rotary engine, a type of pistonless internal combustion engine
- Turbine, a rotary engine that extracts energy from a fluid flow
- Wankel engine, a common type of pistonless rotary engine used in some NSU Motorenwerke AG (NSU) and Mazda cars
- Windmill, a rotary engine that extracts energy from wind
- Waterwheel, a rotary engine that extracts energy from water

== See also ==
- Radial engine, an internal combustion piston engines with a fixed engine block of radially-mounted cylinders driving a rotating crankshaft
