= Electromagnetic door holder =

Electromechanical latch used in fire and security systems

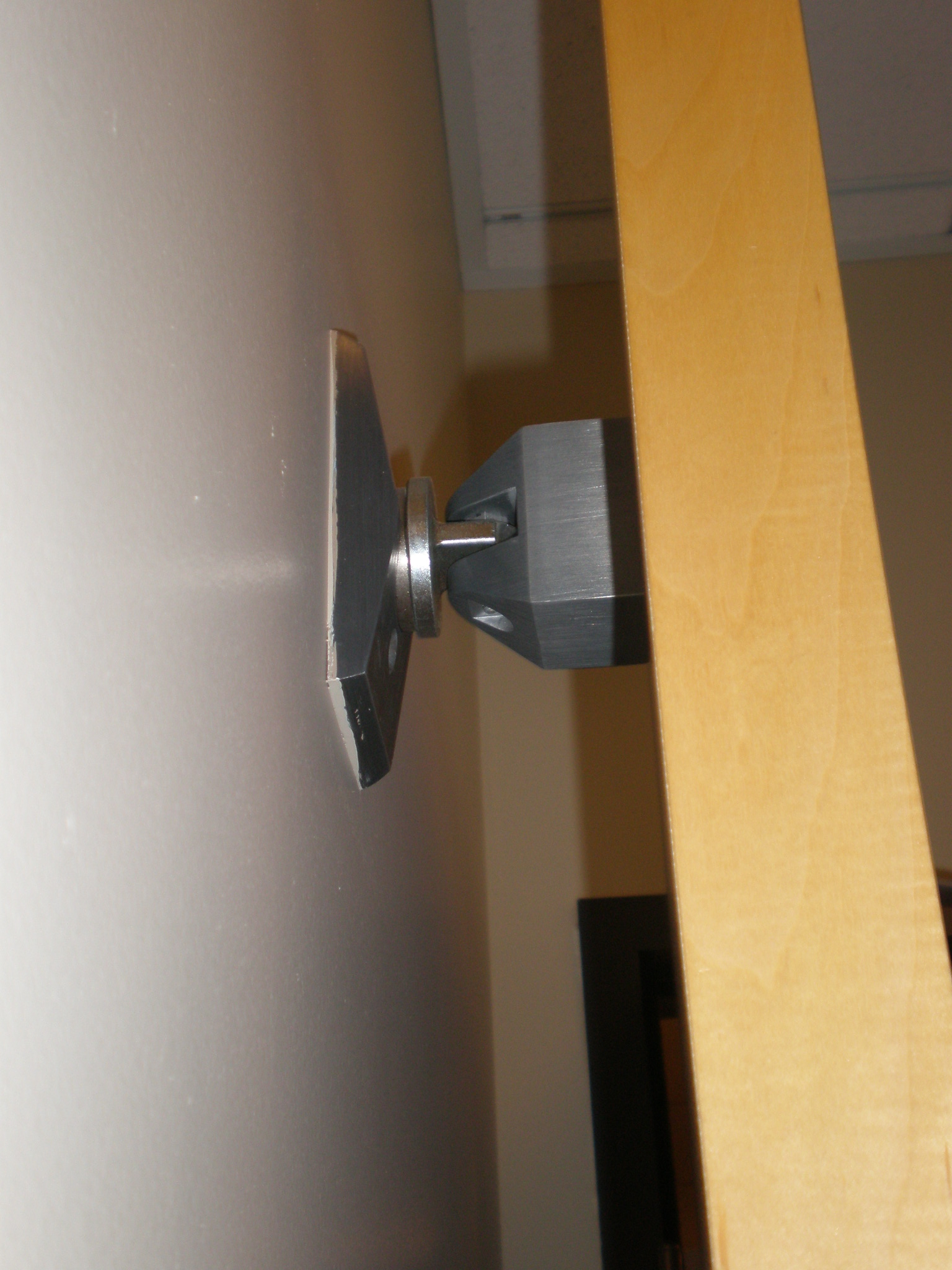
Wall-mounted electromagnetic door holder securing a door in the open position

An electromagnetic door holder (electromagnetic door holder and release or hold-open device, sometimes informally called a mag hold open or electric doorstop) is a simple electromechanical mechanism which can be used to hold a fire door or security door open until given a signal to release. A fire alarm control panel or a similar emergency control system usually powers and controls the door holder.

== Operation ==
A simple electromagnetic door holder consists of a strong electromagnet, usually attached to a wall or mounted in a floor pedestal enclosure, next to the door it controls. The mechanism may be mounted near the floor, at the upper corner of the open door, or at any convenient height along the latch edge (away from the hinged edge).

A steel plate, often mounted on a ball joint or swivel joint, is attached to the door so that it can contact the electromagnet when the door is fully opened. An electric current typically energizes the electromagnet to attract and hold the steel plate, keeping the door open. Unlike electromagnetic locks, the magnetic attraction of an electromagnetic door holder is usually weak enough that it can be manually overpowered at any time by anyone, allowing the door to close.

If a fire alarm control panel, burglar alarm control panel, or similar emergency system is triggered, it will cut electrical power to the electromagnetic door holders under its control. The door holders release, allowing the doors to close automatically using door closers. The electric power to keep the doors open is typically 12 VDC, 24 VDC (common), 24 VAC, 120 VAC, or 240 VAC.

The closed doors may or may not mechanically latch or lock in the closed position. Many fire doors do not lock, to allow building occupants to move within the building to find an exit easily. On the other hand, security doors may close, latch, and lock, to prevent passage. Other designs are used to secure sliding or overhead doors similarly, holding them open until a signal to release the doors to close automatically.

== Reliability ==
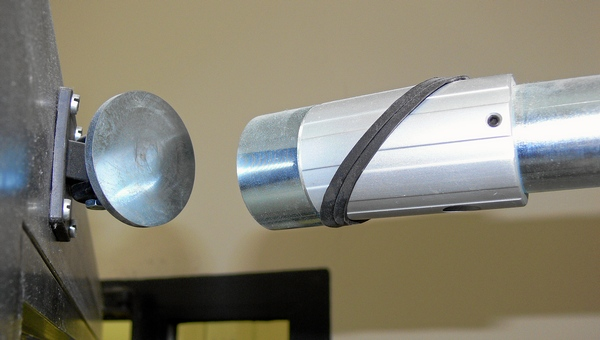
Closeup of swivel plate and electromagnet

In life safety and security applications, electromagnetic door holders must be very reliable; the simplicity of the mechanisms helps considerably. They are designed to be fail-safe in that anything interfering with their operation (such as a power failure) will cause them to release the doors and allow them to close.

To overcome possible remanent magnetism, which could cause the electromagnet to fail to release, some door holders are equipped with a spring-loaded pin that helps push the magnetic plate away from the electromagnet when the power is cut.

== See also ==
- Electric strike
- Smart doorbell
