= Michael Montague, Baron Montague of Oxford =

British businessman and politician

The Right Honourable The Lord Montague of Oxford CBE
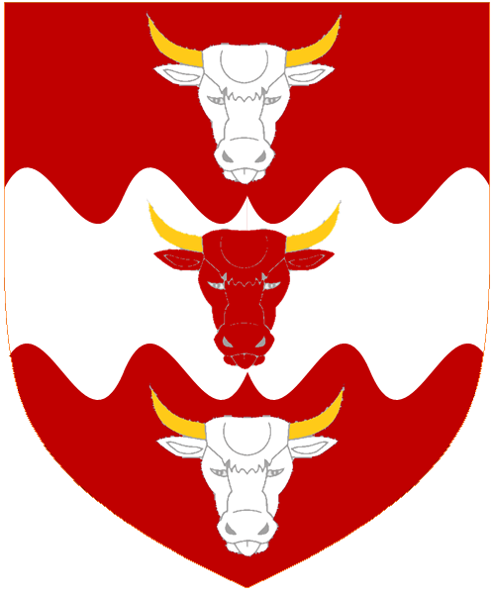

Member of the House of Lords
- In office 1 November 1997 – 5 November 1999

Personal details
- Born: 10 March 1932
- Died: 5 November 1999 (aged 67)
- Party: Labour
- Education: Magdalen College School, Oxford

Michael Jacob Montague, Baron Montague of Oxford, CBE (10 March 1932 – 5 November 1999) was a British businessman and politician.

== Biography ==
Michael Jacob Montague, born on 10 March 1932, the son of David and Eleanor Montague. He attended the Royal Grammar School, High Wycombe, and Magdalen College School, Oxford.

A gifted salesman, Montague founded Gatehill Beco in 1958 aged 26 on an investment of £100, selling electric wire and later making cheap electric boiling rings: "I used to make the goods, sell them, deliver them to the back door, and then go round to the front to collect the money." After he received a large order he could not fulfil himself, Montague sought out a large corporate, and eventually sold out to Valor in 1962, of which he then became a Director and then managing director.

Montague diversified the company through both product innovation and export driven expansion, visiting even the underdeveloped markets of Africa, Asia and Japan personally at least once a year. In 1969 he was made chair of the Asia committee of the British National Export Council, where he served until 1972, as a result of which he was appointed a Commander of the Order of the British Empire (CBE) in the 1970 Birthday Honours.

Montague expanded Valor, when in 1987 Valor paid £263m for Yale locks and NuTone. In August 1989 Ingersoll Rand sold its 2.2% holding in Yale & Valor to Williams Holdings, which thereby took its stake to 5.8%. In January 1991 Williams Holdings paid £330m for Yale & Valor, and Montague left the company. The Valor brand is now owned by Glen Dimplex, and the Yale Lock Company is now a subsidiary of Assa Abloy.

=== Other interests ===
Montague used his money to invest in other business, including the fledgling Planet Hollywood and Ramada Jarvis Hotels.

Montague also expanded his public duties, and was Governor and Chairman of the Audit Commission at Oxford Brookes University. As chair of the English Tourist Board he made attacks on: second-rate hoteliers; greedy seaside impresarios; grubby motorway caterers; miserable museum attendants; surly waiters; and taxi drivers – whom he accused of cadging large tips out of unsuspecting tourists. When latterly as chair of the National Consumer Council, he told the public to boycott places offering poor value for money.

A keen supporter of the Arts, among other activities he sponsored the Oxford Festival and was chair of the Henley Festival from 1992 to 1994.

=== Politics ===
After the 1964 general election, Montague said in an open letter to the press that he "deplored the way the Conservatives had attacked the newly elected Labour government as bad for British business, given that as a businessman I have suffered from the results of bad economic management of the past few years".

A good friend of Labour party leader John Smith and Peter Mandelson, Montague was a member of the Millennium Commission from February 1994 until May 1997 Continuing his friendship of the Labour party via Mandelson with new leader Tony Blair, he was created a life peer on 1 November 1997 taking the title Baron Montague of Oxford, of Oxford in the County of Oxfordshire. It later emerged that this was after he had made a donation of £5,000 to the Labour party.

Montague collapsed while attending the House of Lords on 5 November 1999. He was pronounced dead in the ambulance on the way to St Thomas' Hospital.

=== After death ===
In February 2000, openly gay Lord Alli raised the issue of Montague's Japanese partner of 35 years, Takashi Suzuki, having to sell their home in Dorchester-on-Thames to pay the Inheritance tax. At the time, Inheritance tax was charged at 40 per cent on the excess value of estates valued at £231,000 and above, but there was an exemption for estates inherited by the surviving partner of a married couple. It was part of Alli's campaign that resulted in the laws which created Civil partnerships in the United Kingdom.

== Arms ==
Coat of arms of Michael Montague, Baron Montague of Oxford

Crest
A demi yale Sable armed tusked unglued and supporting with the hooves a key wards downwards and inwards Or.
Escutcheon
Gules on a fess wavy between two bulls’ heads caboshed Argent armed Or a bull’s head caboshed Gules armed Or.
Supporters
On either side a red-crested cardinal reguardant Proper in the beak a chrysanthemum.
Motto
Endless Endeavour
