= Kidde =

Brand of fire safety equipment

- Type: Subsidiary
- Industry: Building safety
- Founded: 1917; 109 years ago
- Founder: Walter Kidde
- Headquarters: Mebane, North Carolina, US
- Products: Smoke and carbon monoxide alarms, fire extinguishers
- Revenue: 1,9 billions $ (2025)
- Number of employees: 6021 (2025)
- Parent: United Technologies (2005–2020); Carrier Global (2020–2024); Kidde Global Solutions (2024–present)
- Website: www.kidde.com

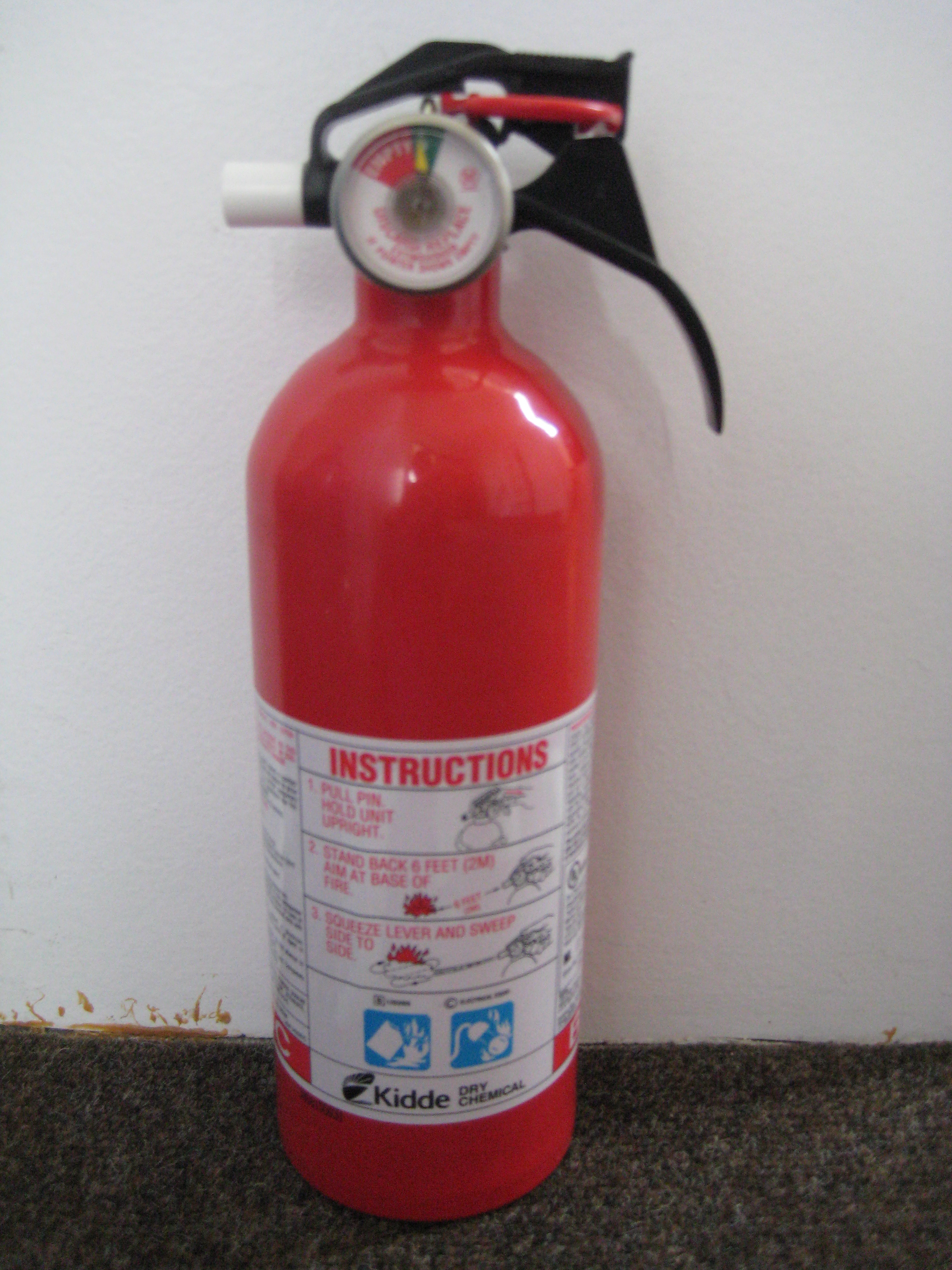
Kidde fire extinguisher

Kidde (/ˈkɪdə/) is an American multinational company that manufactures and distributes fire detection and suppression equipment, as well as smoke and CO alarm units. Kidde is one of America's largest manufacturers of smoke alarms and fire safety products.

Kidde is headquartered in Mebane, North Carolina, and it has been part of Kidde Global Solutions since December 2024.

== History ==
The company was founded by Walter Kidde in 1917 in the United States.

=== 1900s ===
Walter Kidde founded Kidde Inc. in 1917 with $300 he had in savings. In 1918 the company, then known as Walter Kidde & Company, purchased the rights to the "Rich" system; a way to detect fires on board ships.

=== 1920s ===
In 1923, Kidde purchased the patent rights for a siphon device that allowed quick release of carbon dioxide, improving the function of fire extinguishers. In 1924, the company produced the first portable carbon dioxide fire extinguisher and in 1925 it installed the first built in industrial fire extinguishing system. In 1926, Walter Kidde & Company partnered with the Navy to design a system to protect airplane engines against fires.

=== 1930s ===
The company established a British operation at Northolt in 1935 as its first overseas operation. The company further expanded to Africa, Asia, Europe and South America.

=== 1940s ===
When Walter Kidde died in 1943, his son John took control of the company. At that time, the company employed over 5,000 people, and was producing over $60 million of war supplies.

=== 1950s ===
At the end of WWII the company saw a significant drop in sales. In the 1950s, the company diversified into machinery and tool manufacturing, siphon devices for consumer and medical uses, and aircraft accessories.

=== 1960s–1970s ===
Robert L. Dickinson was named president of the company in 1961. In January 1964, Fred Sullivan, officer and director of the Litton Industries, succeeded Dickinson as president and later succeeded John Kidde as chairman. From 1964 to 1968, Kidde grew from $40 million in annual revenues to $400 million. In 1966, Kidde was named to the Fortune 500 list at position 283. In 1968 the company was incorporated as Kidde & Company, Inc.

Kidde acquired the Spartus Corporation, a Louisville, Mississippi–based maker of clocks and camera equipment, in 1970 for $24 million (equivalent to $198.97 million in 2025).

=== 1980s ===
John Kidde died in May 1987. In August 1987, Kidde was purchased for $1.7 billion by August Hanson Industries, the United States arm of Hanson Trust of the United Kingdom.

In August 1988, Hanson sold most of the Kidde fire protection business to Pilgrim House Group, a firm based in the United Kingdom involved in electrical products and fire protection.

Included in the sale were Walter Kidde North America Group, Fenwal Inc.(founded in 1935 by TL Fenn and Carl Walter), and Kidde's Fire Protection Group Europe. During the Kidde acquisition process Pilgrim House was purchased by Williams Holdings plc, an industrial management firm. In 1989, it merged with Graviner (another Williams Holdings business) to form Kidde Graviner.

=== 1990s ===
In 1990, subsidiary Walter Kidde Aerospace Inc. opened a Production and Technology Center, for $4 million. By that time, Kidde products were found in aircraft such as the B-2 Stealth Bomber and 747-400 airliners. In 1993, it acquired Dunford Hepburn. In February 1997, Williams Holdings purchased Chubb Security plc.

In 1996, Kidde International purchased Santa Barbara Dual Spectrum (SBDS) from Hughes Aircraft. SBDS subsequently operated as a division of Kidde Technologies.

In March 1999, Kidde recalled 2 models of Carbon Monoxide Alarms, that were alarming late or not alarming at all. ~1 million (+650 thousand NightHawk brand, +350 thousand LifeSaver brand) units were recalled. Units from November 8, 1998, and March 9, 1999, are affected.

=== 2000s ===
In March 2000, Williams announced the breakup of the company. Now an independent entity, the firm adopted the name Kidde plc in September 2000. In October 2000, Kidde announced it was going to demerge from Chubb plc. Kidde plc listed on the London Stock Exchange in November of that year.

In December 2004, Financial Times reported Kidde as "the market leader in residential fire protection in the United States." In April 2005, United Technologies Corporation finalized its acquisition of Kidde and place the company under its new Fire & Security brand. The move re joined it to its former sister company Chubb Security, and several other brands to create UTC Fire & Security.

In July 2005, Kidde recalled 10-pound industrial fire extinguishers with Zytel valves due to discharge issues, manufactured between 1999 and 2000. 470 thousand units were recalled. Three injuries were reported due to extinguisher failure.

In 2009, Kidde Acquired the company FireX, which was owned by Invensys Controls.

In March 2009, nine models of Kidde XL fire extinguishers manufactured from October 2007 through April 2008 were recalled due to failure of operation. ~167 thousand fire extinguishers were recalled.

In July 2009, Kidde recalled a Dual-Sensor smoke alarm model PI2000, due to possible failure of alarm. Models made from August 2008 and May 2009 are recalled. ~94 thousand units were recalled.

=== 2010s ===
In April 2013, Kidde expanded its Worry-Free product line to include UL-listed carbon monoxide (CO) alarms.

In September 2014, Kidde recalled three models of smoke alarm (i12010S, i12010SCO, and KN-COSM-IBA) for failing to alert buyers of emergency after a power outage. Models made from December 18, 2013, to May 13, 2014, are affected. 1.2 million (+112 thousand in Canada) were recalled.

In February 2015, Kidde recalled 31 models of extinguishers with Zytel valves due to the valve not fully opening, causing the extinguisher to not discharge properly. Affected models were made from July 23, 2013, to October 15, 2014. 4.6 million (+175 thousand in Canada) extinguishers were recalled.

In November 2016, Kidde recalled over 3.6 million (+1.5 million in Canada) NightHawk model KN-COSM-IB combination smoke alarms due to the seven-year "end of life" signal timer being restarted when the battery was replaced, meaning that the alarm cannot signal that its sensors have expired. Models manufactured from June 2004 and December 2010 are affected by the recall.

A year later in November 2017, the US Consumer Product Safety Commission issued a recall notice for 134 models of Kidde fire extinguishers citing failures to discharge correctly when used. As many as 37.8 million extinguishers could be covered by the recall notice. Even extinguishers dating back from the 70's. One death has been reported due to extinguisher failure.

Not too long later in March 2018, Kidde recalled its two Dual-Sensor Smoke Detector models, PI9010 and the PI2010. The reason for the recall was a yellow cap left on one of the sensors that could fail to alert buyers of the alarm of a possible fire. 452,000 units in the US and about 40,000 units in Canada were affected in the recall. The recall affected units of the 2 models manufactured from September 2016, through January 2018. No injuries or accidents were reported because of the yellow cap before the recall.

=== 2020s ===
In May 2021, Kidde announced a recall of their TruSense line of alarms due to the alarms not detecting smoke until fatal levels. 226 thousand units have been recalled.

On May 14, 2023, Kidde-Fenwal filed for Chapter 11 bankruptcy.

In December 2024, Kidde was sold by Carrier Global and became part of a new entity called Kidde Global Solutions.

== Locations ==
Kidde is headquartered in Mebane, North Carolina. Kidde Canada (formerly Pyrene Company or Chubb Security) operates under Kidde Fire Safety North America and is located in Toronto, Ontario. Kidde Aerospace is located in Wilson, North Carolina.

== Awards and recognition ==
In September 2017, Kidde was ranked among the top manufacturers of carbon monoxide alarms. Kidde's fire blanket was also ranked a "top player" in the industry by the Global Fire Blanket Market. Kidde carbon monoxide alarms are included in the "Carbon Monoxide Alarms industry" report of 2017 to 2022.
