= Spartus =

American consumer electronics manufacturer (1934–2001)

Spartus Corporation
- Trade name: Spartus Home Furnishings
- Formerly: Utility Manufacturing Company (1934–1951); Herold Manufacturing Company (1951–1956); Herold Products Company, Inc. (1956–1960)
- Industry: Consumer electronics; Manufacturing
- Founded: 1934; 92 years ago in Chicago, Illinois, United States
- Founder: Jack Galter
- Defunct: 2001; 25 years ago
- Fate: Acquired by Kidde in 1970, itself acquired by Hanson Trust in 1987; rights sold to General Time Corporation in the mid-1990s, later Salton, Inc., in 2001
- Products: Alarm clocks; Analog cameras and equipment; Electric shavers; Wall clocks
- Number of employees: Over 1,000 (c. 1980, peak)

Spartus Corporation was an American consumer electronics manufacturer originally based in Chicago, Illinois. Founded as the Utility Manufacturing Company in 1934, it produced a wide variety of products, including wall clocks, alarm clocks, electric shavers, analog cameras, and more. It sold these through a medley of brands—including Falcon, Spartus, Galter, Regal, Monarch, Spencer, among others. It was founded in 1934 by Jack Galter (1904–1993) as a continuation of his father's manufacturing company.

In 1951, Utility was purchased by its sales manager, Harold Rubin, who renamed the company Herold Manufacturing Company. In 1960, Rubin adopted the Spartus trademark for the company's name, and in 1963, Spartus moved its headquarters to Louisville, Mississippi. It maintained a manufacturing presence in the town until the early 1990s. In 1970, Spartus was acquired by the Kidde & Company, and made a subsidiary. Kidde itself was purchased by a U.S. arm of the Hanson Trust, Spartus being acquired by extension. Manufacturing of Spartus products was permanently moved to mainland China in 1993. Salton, Inc., of Florida later acquired the rights to the Spartus trademark in 2001.

== History ==
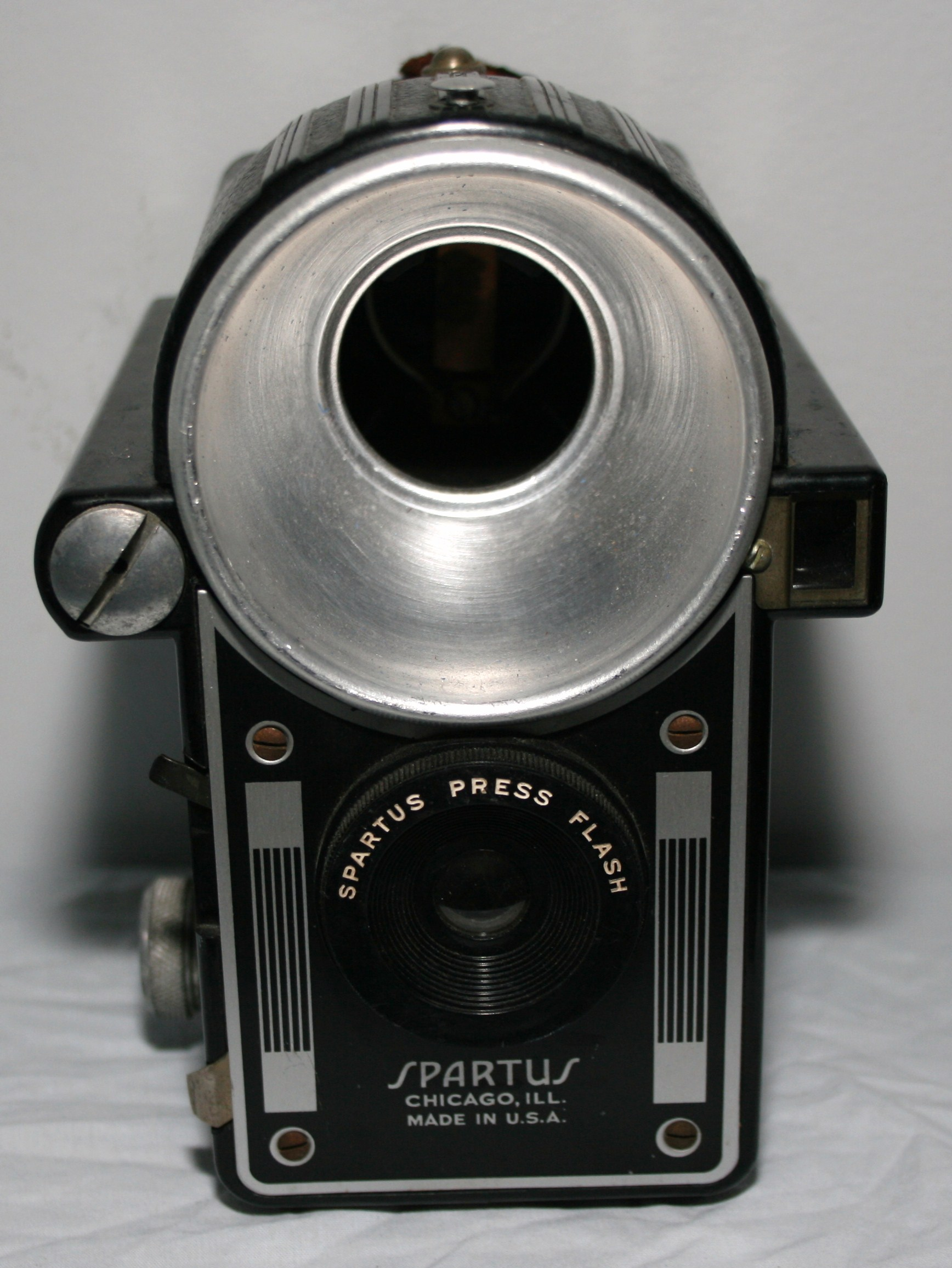
The Spartus Press Flash, cited as the first camera with a built-in flash reflector

Spartus was founded as the Utility Manufacturing Company in Chicago, Illinois, in 1934 by Jack Galter (1904–1993). Galter was a Russian-born immigrant whose family first moved to Chicago, and, later, Sutton, Nebraska. In his 20s, Galter was a jazz and lounge drummer who played for such giants as Benny Goodman, David Rose, and Danny Alvin. In his early 30s, during the Great Depression, he founded Utility as an extension of his father's manufacturing business. During the 1930s, Utility manufactured a wide array of analog camera equipment, selling them under a medley of trademarks, including Falcon, Galter, Monarch, Regal, Spartus, and Spencer, among others. Most notable was their Spartus Press Flash camera, a camera cast in Bakelite. Historians consider the Spartus Press Flash the first camera with a built-in flash reflector.

In 1951, Utility's sales manager Harold Rubin purchased the company from Galter and renamed it the Herold Manufacturing Company, still based in Chicago. Rubin changed the name to Herold Products Company, Inc., in 1956. In 1960, he changed the name again to Spartus Corporation, adopting the name of one its most popular trademarks. The company by this point was more well known for their wall and alarm clocks and electric shavers than their camera equipment. In 1963, Spartus broke ground for a new headquarters and manufacturing complex in Louisville, Mississippi, which was completed in 1964. Spartus remained an integral part of the Louisville's industrial community for decades, the company reaching the 1,000 employee mark in 1970, stabilizing at that number toward the end of the decade. Many of Spartus' employees were represented by the International Union of Electrical Workers.

In 1970, Spartus was acquired by the Kidde & Company, then a diversified American manufacturing company (currently more well known for their fire safety products), for $24 million in a stock swap (equivalent to $198.97 million in 2025). Spartus was then made a subsidiary of Kidde, continuing in this capacity for nearly two decades. In 1987 alone, Spartus manufactured 7 million clocks and generated between $75 million to $100 million in sales. In August that year, Kidde was purchased by Hanson Industries, the U.S. arm of Hanson Trust, a British holding company. Hanson acquired Spartus by extension. Under the auspices of Hanson, Spartus changed their trade name to Spartus Home Furnishings, Inc., and began moving manufacturing overseas, at first to Taiwan, later to mainland China. Later, in the mid-1990s, Spartus' clock manufacturing concern was acquired by the General Time Corporation, whose trademark roster included Westclox and Big Ben. After General Time went bankrupt in 2001, Salton, Inc., owners of the George Foreman Grill, purchased the rights to their trademarks—including Spartus—in August that year.
