= Lee Anderson (disambiguation) =

Lee Anderson (born 1967) is a British politician.

Lee Anderson may also refer to:

- Lee Anderson (boxer) (1889–1970), American boxer
- Lee R. Anderson Sr. (born 1939), American businessman
- Lee Anderson (American politician) (born 1957), member of the Georgia House of Representatives and Georgia State Senate
- Lee Anderson (footballer) (fl. 1991–1994), English footballer see List of Bury F.C. players (25–99 appearances)

== See also ==
- Jon Lee Anderson (born 1957), American writer and reporter
- Leroy Anderson (disambiguation)
- Lee and Penny Anderson Arena, an indoor stadium in Minnesota, USA
