= Nigel Rudd =

British businessman (born 1946)

Sir Nigel Rudd FCA DL
- Born: 31 December 1946 (age 78); Derby, England
- Education: Bemrose Grammar School, Derby
- Occupation: Chairman
- Organization: BBA Aviation PLC
- Children: 3
- Awards: Founding Societies Centenary Award

Sir Nigel Rudd, FCA, DL (born 31 December 1946 in Derby, England) is a Fellow of the Institute of Chartered Accountants. In 1982, he founded Williams Holdings, a company which went on to become one of the largest industrial holding companies in the United Kingdom until its demerger in November 2000, creating Chubb plc and Kidde plc. He became the non-executive chairman of Kidde plc until December 2003. He currently presides as chairman of BBA Aviation PLC.

== Career ==
Rudd began his career as a troubleshooter for London & Northern, a holding company with subsidiaries in a range of industries. In 1982 he bought the Williams engineering company with business partner Brian McGowan. Rudd and McGowan went on to acquire and rebrand a portfolio of under-performing industrial companies throughout the 1980s.

Rudd has been in positions of prominence at several corporations, including serving as Chairman of BAA Limited, The Boots Company, Pilkington PLC and Pendragon PLC, and Deputy Chairman of Barclays PLC until January 2009.

Sir Nigel Rudd sits on the board of directors at the following companies BAA Aviation PLC (Chairman/non-executive director since 2014). Rudd previously held the directorships in Longbow Capital LLP (Director, 2004–2013) and Pendragon PLC (Chairman/NE Director, 1989–2010).

Rudd is one of the founders of the New Entrepreneurs Foundation.

== Personal life ==
Sir Nigel Rudd was born in Derby on 31 December 1946. His father worked for the civil service as a Weights and Measures Inspector. Rudd married his wife Lesley in 1969. The couple have three children. He is a keen golfer, chairing the board of directors of the exclusive Loch Lomond Golf Club, and supporter of Derby County Football Club.

== Education ==
Rudd attended Bemrose Grammar School, Derby. Following his elder brother into accountancy, Rudd qualified as Britain's youngest chartered accountant at the age of 20.

== Awards and honours ==
In 1996, Rudd was knighted by Queen Elizabeth II for services to the manufacturing industry. He holds honorary degrees at multiple tertiary institutions, namely Loughborough and Derby Universities. In 1995, he was awarded the Founding Societies Centenary Award by the Institute of Chartered Accountants. He is a Deputy Lieutenant of Derbyshire and a Freeman of the City of London.

Rudd was Chancellor of Loughborough University from July 2010 to July 2015. He is the Patron of Derby Grammar School.

Preceded by Sir John Jennings	Chancellor of Loughborough University; 2010–2016	Succeeded by Lord Sebastian Coe
