= Ben Bowen (disambiguation) =

Ben Bowen (2002–2005) was a US child whose family raised funds for cancer research after his death from cancer.

Ben Bowen or Benjamin Bowen may also refer to:

- Ben Bowen (musician) (born 1976), Canadian children's musician
- Sir Ben Bowen Thomas (1899–1977), civil servant and Welsh university President
- Benjamin John Bowen or Jackie Bowen (1915–2009), Welsh rugby player

== See also ==
- Benjamin Bowen House
