= Brian McGowan (businessman) =

English businessperson (born 1945)

Brian Dennis McGowan (born 1945) is the co-founder of Williams Holdings, one of the United Kingdom's largest conglomerates.

== Career ==
Educated at Isleworth Grammar School, Brian McGowan initially trained at a firm of accountants in London.

McGowan joined London & Northern, a minor conglomerate, before moving to P&O and then becoming Managing Director of Sime Darby in Hong Kong.

In 1991, together with Nigel Rudd, he acquired a majority stake in W Williams, a small Welsh engineering business and, as Chief Executive, expanded it into one of the United Kingdom's largest conglomerates. He retired from the business in the early 1990s.

He then became Chairman of House of Fraser in 1993. From 2004 to 2008 he was Chairman of Rentokil Initial. From 1997 to 2009 he was also Chairman of Umeco plc.

Since 2002 he has been chairman of international corporate finance advisory firm Catalyst Corporate Finance.
