= Rampart Engineering =

British manufacturer of fire extinguishers

The Rampart Engineering Company was a British manufacturer of fire extinguishers founded in 1910.

== Company timeline ==
- 1910 Rampart Engineering Company was formed in 1910 by Leonard Jones to make fire extinguishers for the trade. Their first factory was in Walworth Road, London. Leonard Jones was the grandson of Samuel Jones, the founder of Samuel Jones and Co. Ltd. the famous paper converters and finishers.
- 1912 Rampart moved to Peckham Grove, London and became the engineering department of Samuel Jones and Co. Ltd., making tape-dispensing machines as well as fire extinguishers.
- 1918 Rampart took over a new factory in Peckham Grove and expanded throughout the first World War and after, continuing to make extinguishers for the trade, its customers including Pyrene and Minimax. Read and Campbell's famous copper-shell hand-rivetted extinguisher was also made by Rampart.
- 1926 Production of extinguishers had expanded to one thousand per week.
- 1929 Rampart changed its name to Samuel Jones and Co. (Engineering) Ltd., but for many years after was known by the locals as 'down the Rampart'. In the period between the wars the company became the largest manufacturer to the fire trade in the UK, producing an extremely wide range of extinguishers, hose reels, and trolley and trailer units.
- 1937 A new factory was built at Peckham Grove.
- 1939-45 During the second World War one million extinguishers, four hundred thousand sten guns and vast quantities of other military equipment were produced as part of the war effort.
- 1968 Chubb and Sons Ltd. purchased Samuel Jones (Engineering) Ltd., and in 1973 the name reverted to the original Rampart Engineering Co. Ltd. In 1971 Rampart purchased Fireward Ltd., specialist manufacturers of plastic bodied fire extinguishers.
- 1981 Rampart was still operating from Peckham Grove manufacturing for the trade.

== See also ==
- Chubb Fire & Security
- Chubb Locks
- Read and Campbell Limited
- Minimax Limited
- The Pyrene Company Limited
