= Minimax Limited =

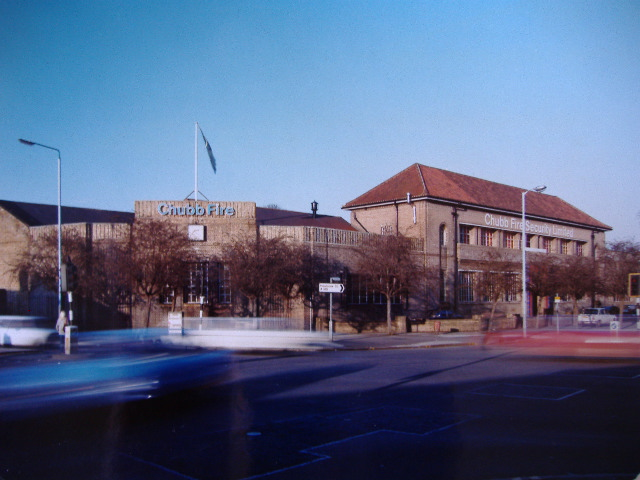
- The former Minimax factory after being acquired by Chubb
- Industry: machinery industry and plant construction other manufacturing n.e.c.
- Fate: Taken over
- Parent: Investcorp; Preussag

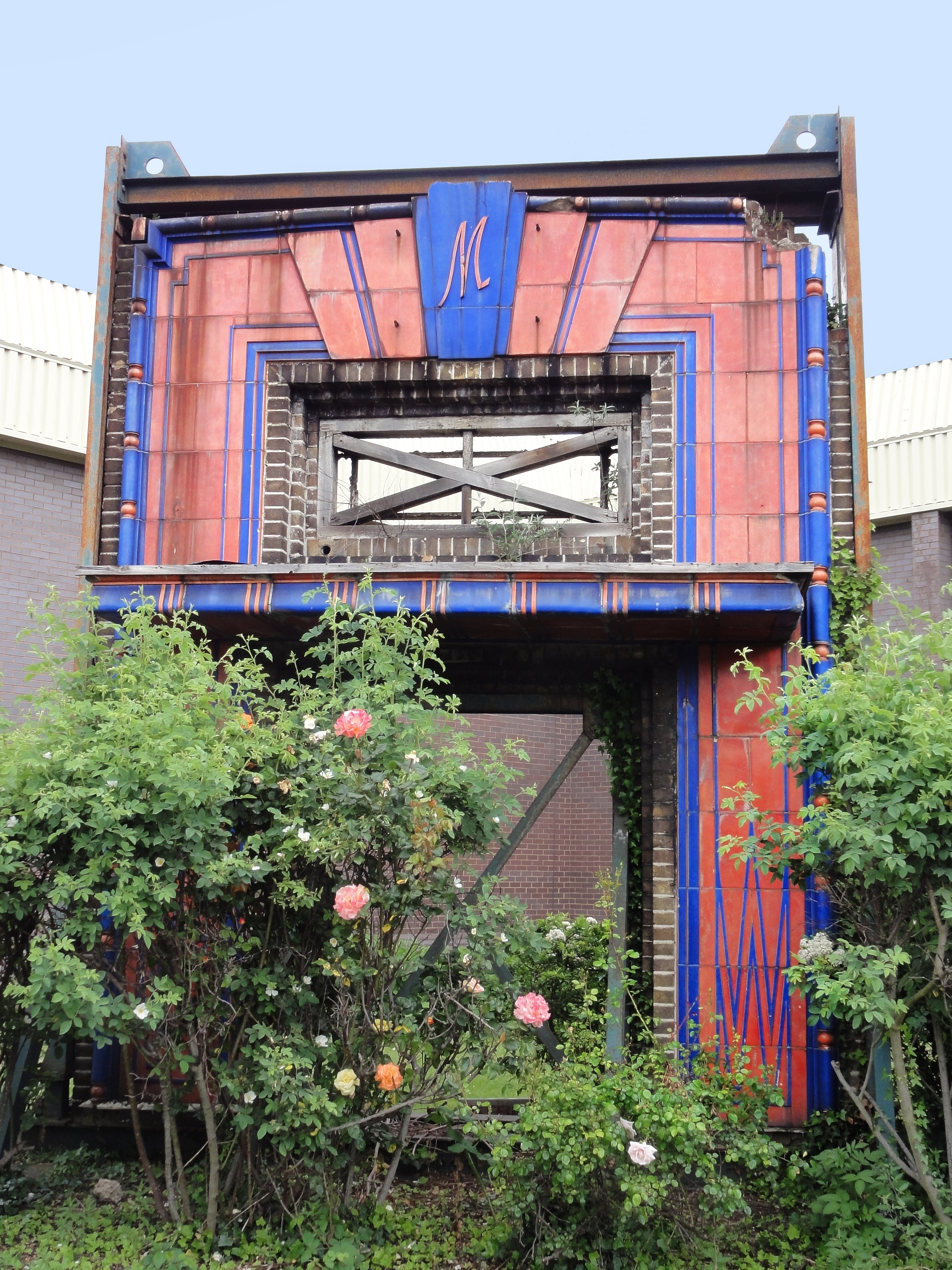
The preserved Art Deco gateway from the factory overlooking 'Minimax Corner'

Minimax Limited was a British manufacturer of fire extinguishers founded in England in 1903 as a branch of the still existing German Minimax GmbH. Their unique conical fire extinguisher was known as 'The Minimax' and in 1904 patented in Germany and in 1905 in the UK by the inventor Wilhelm Graaff

== History ==
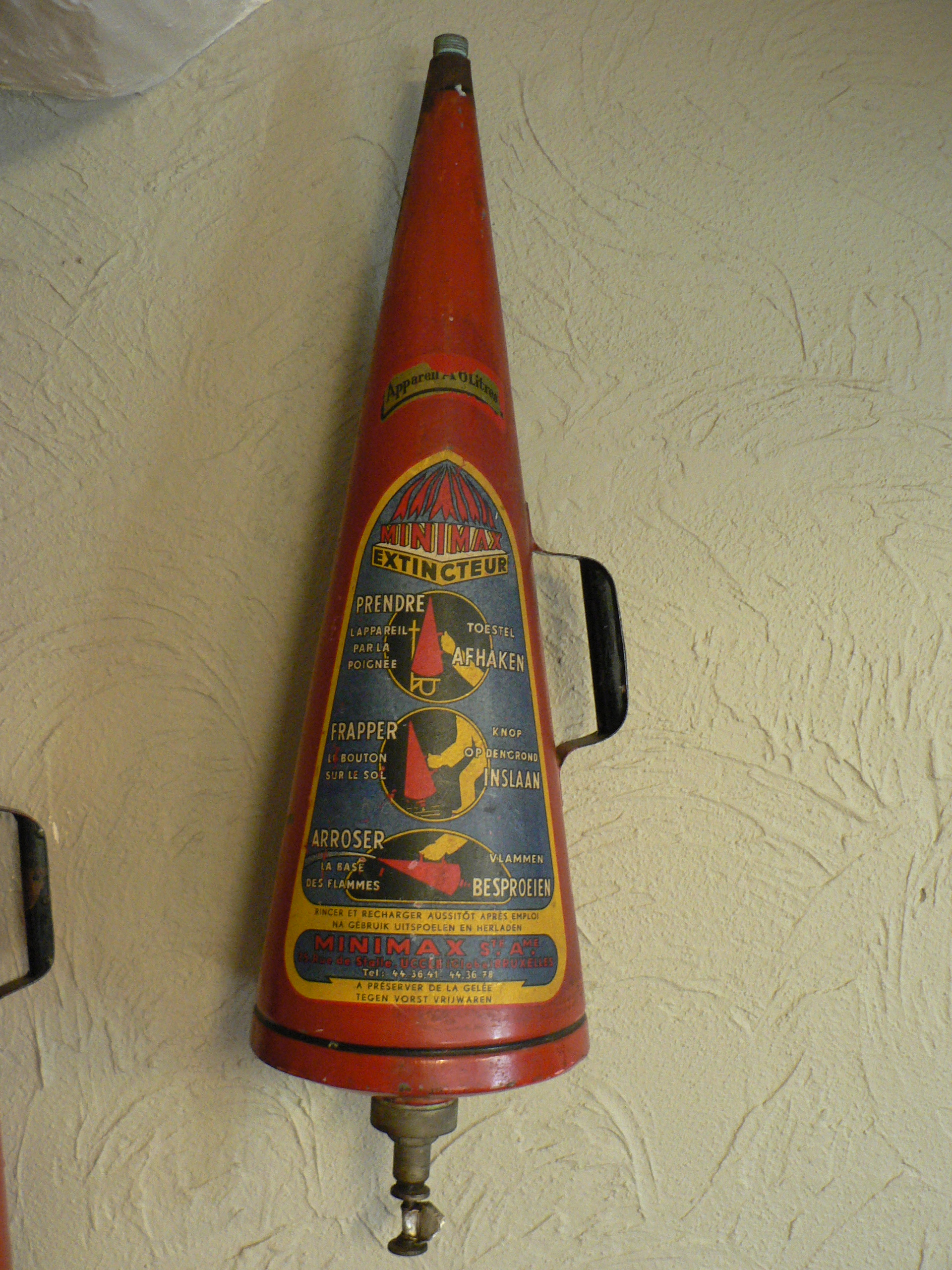
A Minimax extinguisher from the Belgian branch with Dutch and French labeling

Minimax Limited opened their first office in England in 1903 in Leadenhall Street, London, with one salesman. In 1905, the German parent company won the 'highest award' for extinguishers in the Louisiana Purchase Exposition exhibition. In 1907 the British branch of Minimax were suppliers to King Edward VII for protection of his motor car. Minimax was exporting to countries such as Argentina, China, Siam, India, and Tasmania. In Great Britain extinguishers had been supplied to Westminster Abbey, Windsor Castle, Winchester Cathedral, and Oxford and Cambridge universities. A new factory was built at Feltham, Middlesex, in 1911, at the junction of Staines Road and Fagg's Road, 'Minimax Corner', which became a famous landmark.(51°27′28″N 0°24′36″W).

The head office was at Manor Lane, Feltham, Middlesex and the factory was at Staines Road and Faggs Road, Feltham, Middlesex - head office and factory were at two close by different locations.

The company was forced to cease trading in Britain on 5 June 1916 after the passing of the Trading with the Enemy Amendment Act 1916. In 1955 the British Minimax company was purchased by The Pyrene Company Limited.

After unknown British ownership since 1914 soon 1,000 extinguishers a month were being produced. The Czar of Russia placed an order for extinguishers for his yacht Polar Star, and the Siberian Railway was supplied with Minimax extinguishers.

Two hundred extinguishers a day were produced during the First World War, along with many thousands of aerial bombs. Between the wars, many new developments were introduced, including CO_{2} extinguishers. Colliery protection with remote-controlled extinguishers became a speciality. Distillation plants for producing fresh water from salt water were made from 1939 to 1945, with one order for 600 from the Dutch Navy.

Minimax was purchased by The Pyrene Company Limited in 1955. Pyrene was taken over by Chubb Security in 1967.

The factory was closed and demolished in the 1980s, the site has now been refurbished by Nevill Long & Encon Ltd and is their West London Interiors Distribution Centre. The factory's Art Deco gateway was saved and now stands as public art overlooking 'Minimax Corner'. A nearby cul-de-sac is also called Minimax Close.

== See also ==
- Chubb Fire & Security
- Chubb Locks
- Read and Campbell Limited
- Rampart Engineering
- The Pyrene Company Limited
