= Stuart Perry and William Swezey Houses =

Historic houses in Herkimer County, New York

- U.S. National Register of Historic Places
- Location within New York Location within the United States
- Nearest city: 7541 & 7551 Main St., near Newport, New York
- Coordinates: 43°11′26″N 75°1′9″W
- Area: 8.62 acres (3.49 ha)
- Built: c. 1849
- Built by: Babcock, William J.
- Architect: Davis, Alexander Jackson
- Architectural style: Italian Villa
- NRHP reference No.: 12000982
- Added to NRHP: November 28, 2012

Stuart Perry and William Swezey Houses, are two historic homes located at Newport in Herkimer County, New York. They were built in the late 1840s to plans by Alexander Jackson Davis. They are largely identical Italian Villa style, asymmetrical plan, masonry dwellings. They consist of a hipped roof block, centrally placed tower, and gable ended block.

The Perry house has also been known, at various times in its history, as Riverview and The Three Islands. The Swezey house has been known as the Green Tea Cup Inn and Villa Newlife. The two houses were listed on the National Register of Historic Places in 2012.

== See also ==
- Yale-Cady Octagon House and Yale Lock Factory Site, located nearby
