= Leroy Anderson (disambiguation) =

Leroy Anderson (1908–1975) was an American composer.

Leroy Anderson may also refer to:

- LeRoy H. Anderson (1906–1991), American politician
- Leroy Anderson, of Canadian duo Donna & Leroy signed with Boot Records

== See also ==
- Lee Anderson (disambiguation)
