= Lithia Motors =

U.S. automotive retailer

Lithia Motors, Inc.

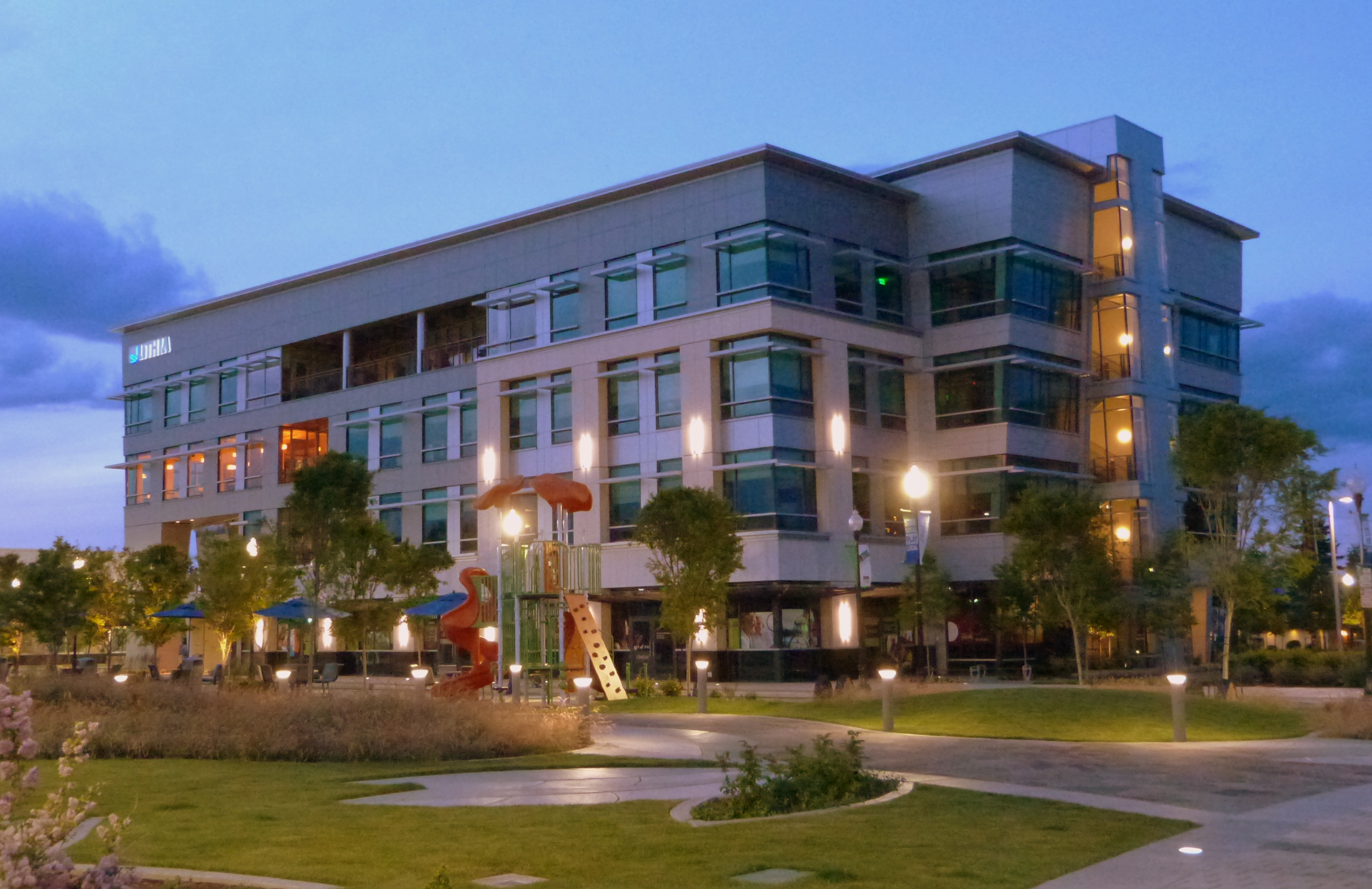
- Lithia's headquarters in Medford, Oregon
- Type: Public
- Traded as: NYSE: LAD; S&P 400 component
- Industry: Automotive dealerships
- Founded: 1946; 80 years ago in Ashland, Oregon, U.S.
- Founder: Walt DeBoer; Sidney DeBoer
- Headquarters: Medford, Oregon, U.S.
- Key people: Bryan DeBoer (President & CEO); Sidney DeBoer (chairman)
- Revenue: ▲US$37.6 billion (2025)
- Net income: ▲US$820 million (2025)
- Number of employees: 30,000 (2024)
- Divisions: Driveway
- Subsidiaries: DCH Auto Group; Carbone Auto Group; Baierl Auto Group; Downtown LA Auto Group; Day Auto Group; Prestige Auto Stores
- Website: lithiadriveway.com

Lithia Motors, Inc. (doing business as Lithia & Driveway) is an American nationwide automotive dealership group headquartered in Medford, Oregon. As of 2025, Lithia is the largest automotive retailer in the United States by revenue, ahead of competitors such as AutoNation and Penske Automotive Group. As of December 31, 2024, Lithia operates 459 dealership locations across the United States, Canada, and the United Kingdom. The company employs approximately 30,000 people worldwide.

In 2015, Lithia Motors entered the Fortune 500 list at #482, making it one of only three Oregon-based companies to appear on the list. This followed Lithia’s 2014 acquisition of the DCH Auto Group, then one of the ten largest dealer groups in the United States with 27 dealerships. In 2016, Lithia rose to #346 on the Fortune 500 and was recognized among the companies with the largest year-over-year climb. Lithia reached #294 in 2018, and #158 in 2022. As of the 2025 Fortune 500, Lithia ranks #124 overall and #1 in the Automotive Retail category.

== History ==
Lithia Motors began in 1946 when Walt DeBoer opened a single car dealership in Ashland, Oregon. In the first year, the five-person company sold 14 cars. In 1968, Walt's son, Sidney DeBoer, took over the business and incorporated Lithia Motors Inc. Sidney reorganized the business and in 1970 purchased a Dodge dealership in Medford. With this, Lithia's base of operation moved to Medford and grew to a total of five stores with 19 franchises by 1990.

In December 1996, the company went public, trading on the New York Stock Exchange with an IPO of $11 per share. By 2003, Lithia had revenues of $2.5 billion from its 84 dealerships, while employing just over 5,500 people. The company had increased dealerships to 88 by 2005. Lithia was fined $500,000 by the state of Alaska in 2006 for charging car buyers illegal document preparation fees at their Alaska dealerships. That year, they also settled with the Equal Employment Opportunity Commission for workplace discrimination. In early 2007, Lithia developed plans to build a 60-acre (240,000 m^{2}) auto mall north of downtown Medford and to build a new corporate headquarters in downtown Medford. The Chrysler Jeep Dodge store moved to the auto mall in September 2007, but the project was put on hold for seven years because the recession hit shortly after. In late 2014, Lithia moved their Honda, Nissan, BMW and Volkswagen stores to the auto mall. The group's Toyota store, which the group had planned to move to the auto mall, instead went through a $1.5 million renovation in 2013 and stayed on their five-acre site in downtown Medford.

In 2010, it was reported that with the backing of two lenders, "the Commons," a mixed-use building with Lithia Headquarters as the largest tenant, was a "go" and could proceed with construction. According to an article by The Mail Tribune, "Lithia partnered with the Medford Urban Renewal Agency to create The Commons, a revitalization project that includes the headquarters and another $14 million in infrastructure and three park blocks, paid for with MURA dollars. Lithia employees moved into their new headquarters in late 2012. In January 2014, the Commons building was awarded Silver Leadership in Energy and Environmental Design (LEED) Certification by the U.S. Green Building Council. Lithia has been the recipient of numerous awards, including Sports Illustrated's All-Star Dealer Award in 1990 and Time's Quality Dealer Award in 1997, 2016 Top Workplace-Oregon Award, 2016 Automotive News Best Dealerships to Work For and 2016 Fortune 500-40th Fastest Growing Company. In 2018, 10 Lithia Motors stores were named "Best Dealerships to Work For" by Automotive News. Cox Automotive awarded Lithia Motors' BMW of Ramsey, New Jersey store with the 2019 Cox Automotive Leader in Sustainability Award, citing outstanding community contributions and sustainable programs including waste reduction, water conservation and energy consumption.

In February 2021, a source reported Lithia Motors was in talks to acquire the Suburban Collection dealer chain in Michigan. Suburban reported revenues of $2.7 billion in 2019. Later in April of the same year, the company acquired New Jersey dealership Planet Honda of Union, which is expected to add $230 million in annual revenue. In August 2021, it purchased Canadian dealership Pfaff Automotive, its first outside the United States, and the Driveway.com subsidiary assumed title sponsorship of the subsidiary's motorsport presence Pfaff Motorsports.

In early 2021, the company added about $6.5 billion to its annual revenue, placing it about one-third of the way towards the company's target, according to CFO Tina Miller, currently in charge over the project. The success of the project is in part attributed to Lithia's e-commerce platform Driveway, which facilitates online used car sales with its inventory coming from dealer lots owned by Lithia.

As of May 2022, Lithia operated 267 stores in 24 states, and 14 in Canada.

With the acquisition of the Jardine Motors Group, Lithia expanded into the United Kingdom in March 2023. At the beginning of 2024, Lithia also acquired the Pendragon Group, thereby integrating additional British dealers (Evans Halshaw, Stratstone, etc.) into the group.

== Product ==
Lithia sells new and used cars of various makes and models. New cars make up 49% of retail auto sales, with used cars making up the other 51%. Additional revenues come from auto repair at the dealerships, financing, and insurance sales.

In 2013 Lithia was named No. 9 on Automotive News' list of the 125 largest U.S. dealership groups, with retail new-vehicle sales of 56,960 units in 2012. In used-vehicle sales it also ranks No. 9, with retail used-vehicle sales of 49,067 in 2012.

The company received a Global Automotive Shareholder Value Award presented by PwC and Automotive News in 2015, the sixth consecutive year for Lithia, followed by a three-year award in 2016. The awards are given to companies to recognize the highest shareholder returns within one-year and three-year periods among Global Vehicle Manufacturers, Global Automotive Suppliers and U.S. Automotive Retailers categories.

== See also ==
- List of companies based in Oregon
- Car dealerships in the United States
