= New Entrepreneurs Foundation =

- Formation: January 1, 2010; 16 years ago
- Type: Nonprofit organisation, Registered UK Charity No. 1140102 Company No. 07469562
- Location: London, United Kingdom
- Services: Entrepreneurship training

New Entrepreneurs Foundation (NEF), founded in 2010, is a London-based nonprofit organization that runs development programmes for aspiring entrepreneurs. The Centre for Entrepreneurs (CFE) is the UK’s leading entrepreneurship foundation. Their aim is to make the country more entrepreneurial.

== History ==
Founded in 2010 by Oliver Pawle, Dee Stirling, Sir Nigel Rudd and The Lord Davies of Abersoch CBE, the NEF was designed to support the next generation of UK entrepreneurs building new businesses.

In 2013, the organisation launched a guide for social entrepreneurs.

In 2017, it was announced a new organisation would be set up by NEF and The Centre for Entrepreneurs to work on long-term challenges to entrepreneurship in the United Kingdom. One million pounds was donated to the project by Mikhail Fridman.

== Organisation ==
NEF solely focuses on the entrepreneurial potential of its intake rather than existing venture ideas. It does not require the contribution of equity from its participants’ ventures. It is entirely funded through corporate and individual sponsorship. See Sponsors and Funding for more information.

Based in London the organisation's direction is decided by a Board of Trustees and CEO Neeta Patel.

== Courses ==
The NEF runs a yearly programme with up to fifty candidates. The candidates project can be anywhere from the ideas stage to running a venture full-time.

The course has several components including:

- Paid Work Placement - placements with start-ups such as Secret Escapes, Uber and E-Leather.
- Learning and Development Workshops - training workshops provided in partnership with business schools, including UCL, London Business School and other specialist training providers. Workshops cover topics such as Negotiation, Web Development and Pitching.
- Speaker Series - Past speakers include Dido Harding (CEO, Talk Talk), Gerry Murphy, (Chairman, Blackstone), Dr. Hermann Hauser CBE (co-founder, Amadeus Capital Partners), Lara Morgan (co-founder, StartUp Britain), Brett Akker (founder, Streetcar, now Zipcar) and Marcia Kilgore (founder, Bliss, FitFlop & the Soap & Glory range)
- Coaching - an executive coach to help with personal development.
- Mentorship - a business mentor from a specific industry.

Each June the current cohort and alumni pitch their business ventures to a panel of investors.

== Business ==
As of July 2016, NEF has developed 155 entrepreneurial ventures, of which 62 remain active, with more than £10m in investment raised and 650 jobs created.

Compared to March 2022, the founders NEF and Alumni have gone on to create over 200 live businesses, 5,000 jobs, raise £221m in early-stage funding and now have a collective valuation of £630m.

Among these businesses are Inkpact, Pollen8, Plus44 Holdings (whose primary product is Sliide App), Stand4Socks, Krzana, Wiser, Sideways6, Turn Partners and CharlieHR.

== See also ==
- Entrepreneurs' Organization
