= Newport Stone Arch Bridge =

- U.S. National Register of Historic Places
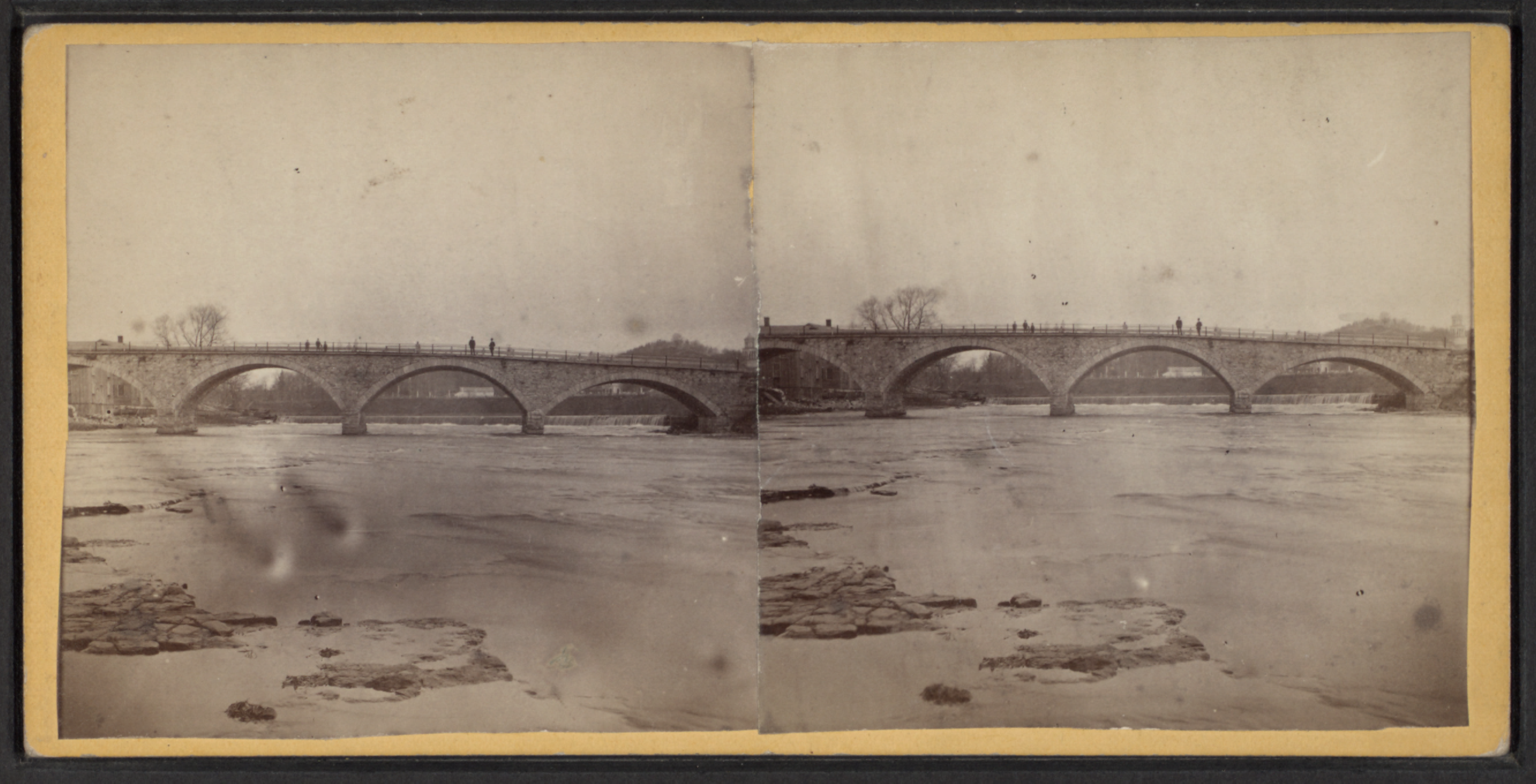
- Stone Bridge Newport New York from Robert N. Dennis collection of stereoscopic views

- Location within New York Location within the United States
- Location: Bridge Street across West Canada Circle, Newport, New York
- Coordinates: 43°11′6″N 75°1′4″W
- Area: 1.3 acres (0.53 ha)
- Built: 1853
- Architect: Boyer, Leonard
- Architectural style: Stone arch bridge
- NRHP reference No.: 91002035
- Added to NRHP: February 10, 1992

Newport Stone Arch Bridge is a historic stone arch bridge located at Newport in Herkimer County, New York. It was constructed in 1853 and spans West Canada Creek. It is 238 feet long and has four arch spans with rises of 16 to 22 feet.

It was listed on the National Register of Historic Places in 1992.
