= Walter Kidde =

American businessman (1877–1943)

- Born: March 7, 1877; Hoboken, New Jersey
- Died: February 9, 1943 (aged 65)
- Education: Stevens Institute of Technology
- Known for: Fire extinguishers
- Scientific career
- Fields: Fire suppression
- Workplaces: Kidde

Walter Kidde (/ˈkɪdə/; March 7, 1877 – February 9, 1943) was an American businessman. He was the owner of the Kidde company which manufactured fire extinguishers. His parents immigrated to the United States from Bohemia. Kidde graduated from Stevens Institute of Technology in 1897. He died of a heart attack in 1943 at the age of 65.

== Career ==
At the age of 23, Walter Kidde opened Walter Kidde & Company. Walter Kidde & Company helped build ship yards at Port Newark and Kearny. He later joined the New Jersey State Highway Commission. During his time there, he oversaw the first traffic circle in Camden, the first clover-leaf intersection and most importantly the Pulaski Skyway in 1932. Even though he had no railroad experience, Walter Kidde was the court appointed trustee of the bankrupt New York, Susquehanna and Western Railway from July 24, 1937 until his death in 1943.

== Walter Kidde & Company ==
Walter Kidde & Company started out as a construction company, but slowly grew into a fire suppression company. In 1918 Walter Kidde & Company purchased the rights to the "Rich" system for on board fire detection and suppression. The problem with this system was steam was used to put out fire, which then caused considerable damage to the cargo on the ship. Kidde came up with the solution to use carbon dioxide instead of steam. This new design had one drawback, the carbon dioxide was not being released fast enough. In order to solve this problem, he bought the rights to a patent for a siphoning device. With this system Walter Kidde & Company released the first portable carbon dioxide fire extinguisher and the first built in industrial system. In 1926 Walter Kidde & Company helped the US Navy design a system to prevent engines on airplanes from catching fire.

In the 1930s and the 1940s the Walter Kidde & Company experienced great growth reaching markets in Asia, Europe, Africa, and South America. World War II helped Walter Kidde & Company reach unprecedented sales. In 1938 Walter Kidde & Company had sales of $2 million, and by 1943 the company was producing over $60 million worth of war equipment. This massive increase in sales had Kidde wondering if he was fit to run such a large company. Walter Kidde & Company was hit with a huge backlog and was always behind schedule. This was because Walter Kidde & Company had to adapt their products that were meant for peacetime to those to be used during wartime. After Walter Kidde's death in 1943 the company was passed down to his son John Kidde.

== Boy Scouts ==
Kidde was a great friend to Boy Scouting in the Montclair, New Jersey area. His engineering efforts and personal financial donations were instrumental in creating a dam of the Panther Brook (now known as Fox Brook) and resultant Lake Vreeland in 1917. The Lake is the centerpiece of Camp Glen Gray, Mahwah, NJ founded in 1917, which was the first purpose-built Boy Scout camp in New Jersey, and among the oldest still in existence in the US. Kidde was later honored with the Silver Beaver Award, the highest honor a scout council can bestow for volunteer efforts.

== Accomplishment ==
- Chairman of the board of trustees of Stevens Institute of Technology
- Member of the New Jersey advisory board of the Public Works Administration
- President of the New Jersey Chamber of Commerce from 1935 to 1938

== Memorials ==
Kidde is honored with the Walter Kidde Dinosaur Park. Kidde received an honorary doctorate from Stevens Institute of Technology in 1935. The Kidde building at Stevens Institute of Technology in Hoboken, New Jersey is named after Dr. Kidde. Silver Beaver, BSA council-level Award; Hall of Fame member, Friends of Camp Glen Gray, Mahwah, NJ.
