= Newport (village), New York =

Newport, New York
- Village
- Location within New York Location within the United States
- Coordinates: 43°11′14″N 75°1′1″W
- Country: United States
- State: New York
- County: Herkimer
- Town: Newport

Area
  - Total: 0.59 sq mi (1.53 km^{2})
  - Land: 0.53 sq mi (1.36 km^{2})
  - Water: 0.066 sq mi (0.17 km^{2})
- Elevation: 663 ft (202 m)

Population (2020)
  - Total: 543
  - Density: 1,032.6/sq mi (398.68/km^{2})
- Time zone: UTC-5 (Eastern (EST))
  - Summer (DST): UTC-4 (EDT)
- ZIP code: 13416
- Area code: 315
- FIPS code: 36-50573
- GNIS feature ID: 0958518
- Website: www.villageofnewportny.org

Newport is a village in Herkimer County, New York, United States. The population was 543 at the 2020 census.

The village is in the eastern part of the town of Newport and is northeast of Utica.

== History ==
The early community was known as the "Bowen Settlement", after its founder Benjamin Bowen. He purchased the land around 1788 and began improvements and invited settlers to purchase land.

The village was incorporated in 1857. It was then an important cheese center.

Newport was the home of Algernon Smith (1842 – 1876), an officer in the U.S. 7th Cavalry Regiment who was killed in the Battle of the Little Bighorn. Newport was also the home of Linus Yale Sr. and Linus Yale Jr., lockmakers and inventors. The Yale-Cady Octagon House and Yale Lock Factory Site is located in Newport.

Five other structures in Newport are on the New York State and National Register of Historic Places: the Benjamin Bowen House, Newport Stone Arch Bridge, Masonic Temple — Newport Lodge No. 445 F. & A.M., and Stuart Perry and William Swezey Houses.

== Geography ==
The village is in the eastern part of the town of Newport, on both sides of West Canada Creek, a tributary of the Mohawk River, though the village center is on the eastern side of the creek. According to the United States Census Bureau, the village has a total area of 0.58 square miles (1.5 km^{2}), of which 0.54 square miles (1.4 km^{2}) are land and 0.066 square miles (0.17 km^{2}), or 10.87%, are water.

New York State Route 28, Main Street, is a north–south highway through the village, leading northwest 4 miles (6 km) to Poland and southeast the same distance to Middleville. Herkimer, the county seat, is 12 miles (19 km) to the south of Newport on NY 28. County Road 34 passes through the part of Newport on the west bank of West Canada Creek.

Brown Island in West Canada Creek is in the southern part of Newport.

== Demographics ==
Historical population
Census	Pop.	Note	%±
1870	651		—
1880	713		9.5%
1890	659		−7.6%
1900	610		−7.4%
1910	583		−4.4%
1920	703		20.6%
1930	696		−1.0%
1940	627		−9.9%
1950	752		19.9%
1960	827		10.0%
1970	908		9.8%
1980	746		−17.8%
1990	676		−9.4%
2000	640		−5.3%
2010	640		0.0%
2020	543		−15.2%
U.S. Decennial Census

As of the census of 2000, there were 640 people, 262 households, and 165 families residing in the village. The population density was 1,256.1 inhabitants per square mile (485.0/km^{2}). There were 289 housing units at an average density of 567.2 per square mile (219.0/km^{2}). The racial makeup of the village was 99.22% White, 0.47% Black or African American, and 0.31% from two or more races. Hispanic or Latino of any race were 0.16% of the population.

There were 262 households, out of which 32.1% had children under the age of 18 living with them, 46.9% were married couples living together, 12.6% had a female householder with no husband present, and 37.0% were non-families. 33.2% of all households were made up of individuals, and 16.4% had someone living alone who was 65 years of age or older. The average household size was 2.44 and the average family size was 3.10.

In the village, the population was spread out, with 25.6% under the age of 18, 6.1% from 18 to 24, 28.9% from 25 to 44, 20.5% from 45 to 64, and 18.9% who were 65 years of age or older. The median age was 38 years. For every 100 females, there were 86.6 males. For every 100 females age 18 and over, there were 81.7 males.

The median income for a household in the village was $33,750, and the median income for a family was $41,111. Males had a median income of $32,500 versus $26,528 for females. The per capita income for the village was $18,324, and 23.4% of the population is over 65. About 6.5% of families and 7.8% of the population were below the poverty line, including 14.4% of those under age 18 and 3.5% of those age 65 or over.
