= Pinewood Technologies =

British company

Pinewood Technologies Group PLC
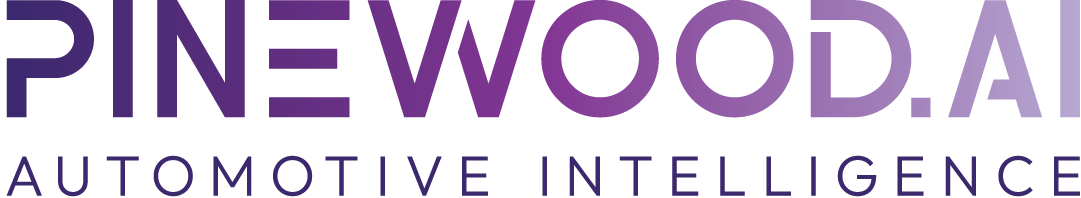
- Type: Public limited company
- Traded as: LSE: PINE
- Industry: Software
- Predecessor: Williams Holdings
- Founded: 1989; 37 years ago
- Headquarters: Birmingham
- Key people: Ian Filby (Chairman); Bill Berman (CEO) Ollie Mann (CFO)
- Revenue: ▲£40.5 million (2025)
- Operating income: ▼£8.3 million (2025)
- Net income: ▲£50.3 million (2025)
- Website: www.pinewood.ai

Pinewood Technologies Group PLC (LSE: PINE) is a business focused on pure-play software-as-a-service for car dealerships. The company is based at Solihull Parkway, Birmingham. It was listed on the London Stock Exchange and was a constituent of the FTSE 250 Index until it was acquired by Ridgeview Partners in October 2026.

== History ==
The Pendragon logo used by the company until February 2024

The company was established when the vehicle division of Williams Holdings, which operated nineteen car dealerships, was demerged as Pendragon PLC in November 1989. From that time until April 2010, the company was chaired by Sir Nigel Rudd.

In 1990, the company expanded its portfolio to incorporate volume car franchises, such as Ford and Vauxhall. Following this, Pendragon began a series of high profile acquisitions. The Stratstone brand, largely associated with London, was acquired in 1992, establishing a relationship for Pendragon with Jaguar and Land Rover. In August 1997, the company acquired 17 volume car dealerships from Lex Service PLC.

In August 1998, Pinewood Computers was acquired by Pendragon, expanding the company's portfolio into the specialist areas of dealer management systems, telecommunications and remote security monitoring systems for the retail motor industry.

Pendragon went on to acquire Evans Halshaw of Birmingham in February 1999. After this, a further 32 franchised dealerships were bought from Lex Service PLC in March 2000.

In July 2000, Pendragon expanded into America, with their acquisition of Bauer Jaguar, the third largest Jaguar dealership in America. Throughout the remainder of 2000 and into 2001, various other dealerships based in California were acquired including, in April 2001, Hornburg, which held the Jaguar and Land Rover dealership in Los Angeles.

Pendragon PLC acquired C. D. Bramall of Harrogate, taking on 111 new dealerships, in March 2004, and then bought Reg Vardy PLC of Sunderland, taking on 96 new dealerships, in December 2005. However, in April 2006, Pendragon were unable to complete a proposed takeover of Lookers. Soon thereafter, the automotive industry was hit by a recession, leading to the closure of dealerships, and job cuts in both the United Kingdom and United States.

In April 2019, shares in the company fell 13%, after it posted their £2.8 million first quarter loss, substantially below the £6 million profit predicted by analysts. After an initial business review in June 2019, it was found that losses incurred by the Car Store division had jumped from £11.9m in 2018 to over £25m in 2019, as a result of excess used car stock and execution inefficiency. Its CEO, Mark Herbert, left the company after serving for just three months.

Following the sale of its motor dealerships (Stratstone, Evans Halshaw, California and Car Store) to Lithia Motors, the company changed its name from Pendragon PLC to Pinewood Technologies in February 2024.

In September 2024, Pinewood Technologies announced a strategic $4.2 million minority investment in Seez, a Dubai-based automotive AI company.

On 24 October 2024 Pinewood Technologies announced its customer-facing name is now Pinewood Automotive Intelligence, with a contemporary brand look that puts tech at the heart of the business and underpins global growth plans that were announced to investors at the company's first Capital Markets Day.

In August 2026, the company agreed to a takeover offer from private equity firm, Ridgeview Partners, worth £545 million. The acquisition was approved by the court on 25 September 2026, so allowing the transaction to proceed to completion.

== Operations ==
The company is focused on pure-play software-as-a-service for car dealerships.
