= Salton, Inc. =

American home appliances company

- Formerly: Salton, Inc.
- Industry: Home appliances
- Founded: 1947; 79 years ago
- Founder: Lou Salton
- Defunct: 2010; 16 years ago
- Fate: Acquired by Spectrum Brands
- Headquarters: Miramar, Florida, United States

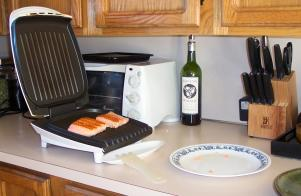
A typical George Foreman grill

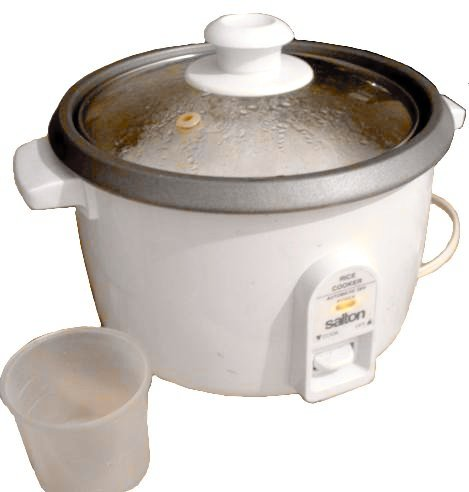
A Salton electric rice cooker

Salton, Inc. (briefly Russell Hobbs, Inc.), was an American company based in Florida which manufactured home appliances, most notably the George Foreman grill, Russell Hobbs and Black & Decker kitchen appliances. In June 2010, Russell Hobbs, Inc. was taken over by and became part of Spectrum Brands.

== History ==
The company was founded in 1947 by Lou Salton, a Jewish immigrant from Poland, and its headquarters were in Miramar, Florida.

In October 2000, Salton entered an exclusive license agreement with Synergy Worldwide to market and distribute the "Spin Fryer", designed by Reno R. Rolle, under the George Foreman brand.

In 2001, Salton bought the UK housewares and personal care company Pifco Group, which included the brands of Russell Hobbs, Carmen and Tower.

Salton also purchased Westclox in 2001, the name and other trademarks (including Big Ben and Spartus) from the bankrupt General Time Corporation.

Salton was licensed to make small appliances, such as vacuum cleaners under the Westinghouse name, from 2002 to 2008.

On August 6, 2007, Salton was suspended from the NYSE. It was subsequently listed on the OTC Bulletin Board, changing its symbol from SFP to SFPI.

In October 2007, Salton sold its entire time products business, including the Westclox and Ingraham trademarks, to NYL Holdings LLC.

Salton merged with another small household appliance business, Applica Incorporated, in December of the same year, which owned the LitterMaid brand and a license to the Black and Decker brand for home appliances. Applica then became a wholly owned subsidiary of Salton, Inc. In December 2009, the combined company changed its name to Russell Hobbs, Inc. The name was derived from the British company, Russell Hobbs.

A Canadian company with the name Salton Appliances (1985) Corp. continues to operate in the home appliance sector as an independent entity. There has never been any connection between Russell Hobbs, Inc. (formerly Salton, Inc.) and Salton Appliances (1985) Corp., which sells small kitchen appliances widely under Salton, Toastess, Delfino, and private brands throughout Canada, the United States, and Latin America.

== Spectrum Brands ==
Spectrum Brands bought Russell Hobbs, Inc. in 2010.
