= Masonic Temple — Newport Lodge No. 445 F. & A.M. =

Historic building in Herkimer County, New York

- U.S. National Register of Historic Places
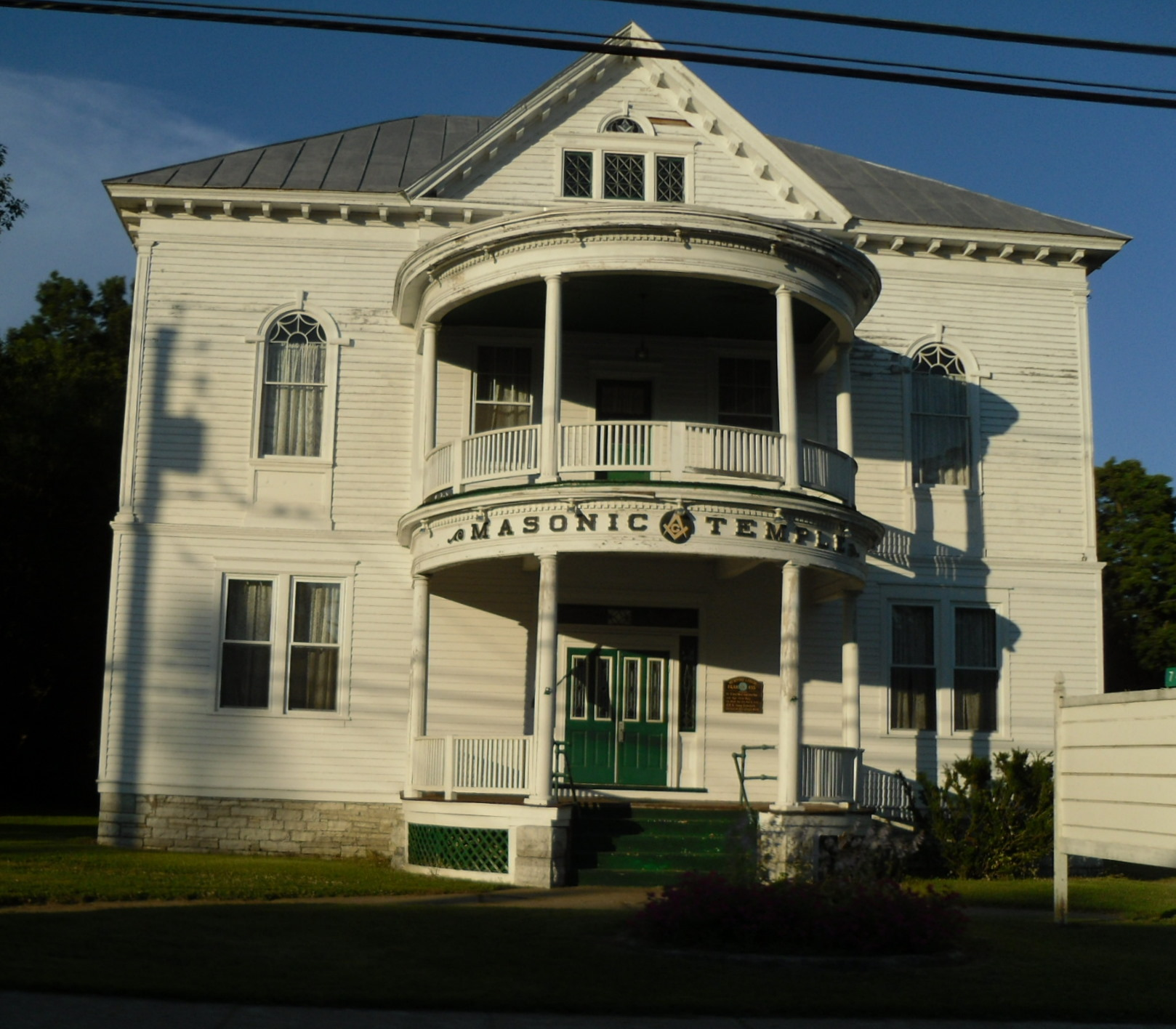
- Masonic Temple — Newport Lodge No. 445 F. & A.M., July 2010

- Location within New York Location within the United States
- Location: 7408 NY 28, Newport, New York
- Coordinates: 43°10′51.42″N 75°0′37.84″W
- Area: 0.8 acres (0.32 ha)
- Built: 1903
- Built by: John Turner Construction, Henry P. Barney
- Architect: Linn Kinne
- Architectural style: Colonial Revival
- NRHP reference No.: 09001228
- Added to NRHP: January 14, 2010

The Masonic Temple — Newport Lodge No. 445 F. & A.M. is a historic building located in Newport in Herkimer County, New York. Built in 1903 as a meeting hall for a local Masonic Lodge, the building is a 2 1/2-story, five-bay-wide by three-bay-deep wood-frame building, with a rectangular main block and square shaped rear wing. It features a two tiered, semi-circular entry porch. The interior features Colonial Revival style detailing.

It was listed on the National Register of Historic Places in 2010.
