= APi Group =

American holding company

APi Group Corporation is an American holding company headquartered in New Brighton, Minnesota. It provides fire and life safety, security, and specialty services worldwide. The company trades on the New York Stock Exchange under the ticker symbol APG.

In 2026, APi Group debuted on the Fortune 500 list at position 486.

== History ==
APi Group began as a plumbing and heating company established in 1926 by Reuben L. Anderson in St. Paul, Minnesota, originally named Asbestos Products Incorporated.

In 1964, Reuben Anderson had a heart attack and his son, Lee Reuben Anderson Sr., returned to the Twin Cities to assume leadership of the business.

In 1985, the company established an employee stock ownership plan (ESOP).

The organization was renamed APi Group in 1997. In 2002, Anderson transitioned the chief executive role to Russell Becker, remaining as chairman.

On October 1, 2019, Anderson sold his interest in APi Group to J2 Acquisition Limited, a SPAC co-founded by Martin E. Franklin.

APi Group began trading on the New York Stock Exchange in April 2020 under the ticker symbol APG.

On July 27, 2021, APi Group announced an agreement to acquire the Chubb Fire & Security from Carrier Global Corporation for $3.1 billion. The acquisition closed on January 3, 2022.

== Leadership ==
Russell A. Becker has served as president and chief executive officer since 2002. He previously led a subsidiary of APi for seven years.
