= Read and Campbell Limited =

Firefighting equipment manufacturer

Read and Campbell Limited was a British manufacturer of firefighting equipment founded in 1878. The company was an early pioneer in the design and manufacture of portable fire extinguishers.

== History ==
The company was founded in 1878 by two Scottish engineers, Read and Campbell, who had been bridge building in Argentina formed a company, Aerators Ltd., to make carbon dioxide and gas cylinders. They formed the company Read and Campbell Ltd. in 1881 and registered a design in Great Britain in the same year to cover "the arrangement for piercing capsules" to expel water and carbon tetrachloride by means of a CO_{2} cartridge. The patent was granted in 1909. The fire extinguisher worked on the principle of a pressurised CO_{2} cartridge being pierced, the pressure inside thus released expanding into the extinguisher body and expelling the contents under pressure. Other types of extinguishers worked by mixing sulphuric acid with a solution of bicarbonate and water-the soda acid extinguisher.

With the growth in motoring and the use of petrol engines there was a call for an extinguisher especially designed for fighting petrol fires. In 1911 Read and Campbell took out patent rights in Argentina on their 'Petrolex' extinguisher. This was a carbon tetrachloride extinguisher operated by a CO_{2} cartridge. The Royal Automobile Club conducted tests on the 'Petrolex' which passed with flying colours. 'Waterloo' extinguishers-water filled, were installed in many Royal residences and public buildings including 'Windsor Castle and all the Royal Palaces of England', the British Museum, the Victoria and Albert Museum and the General Post Office. Royal cars were fitted with 'Petrolex' extinguishers.

The North Metropolitan Electric Power Supply Company carried out a series of stringent tests on the 'Petrolex' extinguisher and informed Read and Campbell that, 'I have never seen any fire extinguishing appliance that seemed as well suited and effective for dealing with fires in Electrical Stations'. Further patents were granted in France and Brazil during this period. In 1914 foam compound was registered in Great Britain. Read and Campbell introduced their 'Rocsuds' which was an early form of foam extinguisher. The contents were, amongst other things, saponin, derived from the roots of soapwort, sodium bicarbonate, extract of vegetable syrup from quillaia and liquorice. There was a great expansion of business during this period because of military requirements during the First World War. At this time the 'Waterloo' copper-bodied extinguisher was introduced-it was claimed that the copper did not discolour the water, and prevented staining of tapestries and oil painting in art galleries and Museums.

The 'Tetra' and 'Roc-Tetra' carbon tetrachloride hand pump for vehicles was introduced in 1927 and adopted by the RAC for use on vehicles in its Road Service fleet.

An article in the 'Evening Chronicle' appeared in 1928 stated that it was a legal necessity for motorists to have their garages equipped with fire extinguishers or to empty their petrol tanks each time they put their cars away.

In 1929 the Duke of York's household was protected by Read and Campbell extinguishers and precise instructions on fire drill procedure were printed. In the same year the Athenaeum Club, the National Gallery and the Victoria and Albert Museum were equipped with Read and Campbell extinguishers.

During the Second World War, Read and Campbell continued to manufacture extinguishers, both for civilian and military use.

In 1948 the company was awarded the contract for supplying extinguishers to London Transport. The Read and Campbell copper shell extinguisher was installed in the Royal Automobile Club in London.

Chubb and Sons acquired a 20% stake in the company in 1964, and the in 1965, they acquired the remaining 80%. The company continued to operate from Horsham as Read and Campbell until the formation of Chubb Fire Security Limited in 1971.

== See also ==
- Chubb Fire & Security
- Chubb Locks
- Minimax Limited
- Rampart Engineering
- The Pyrene Company Limited
