= Cotswold Air Show =

Airshow in Gloucestershire, England

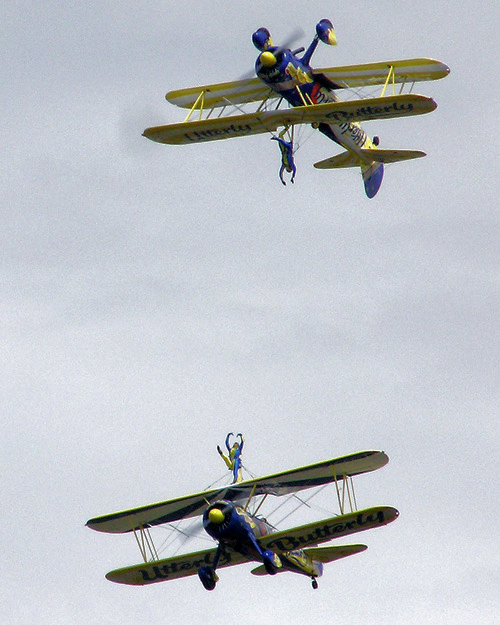
- The Utterly Butterly wing-walking display team perform at the 2004 Kemble Air Show
- Genre: Air show
- Venue: Cotswold Airport
- Location: Gloucestershire
- Country: U.K.
- Attendance: ~20,000 (2008)

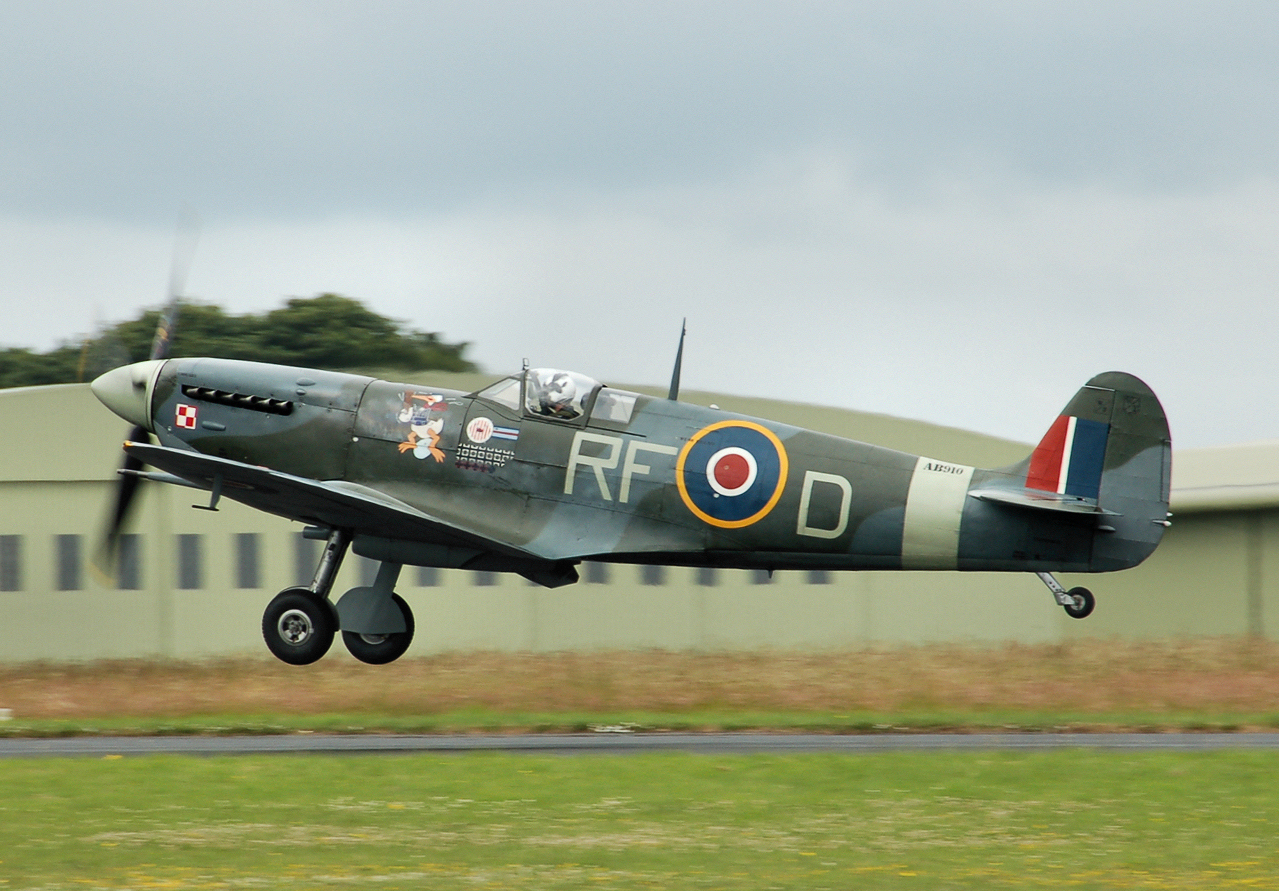
A Supermarine Spitfire takes off from Kemble Airport at the 2009 Cotswold Air Show

The Cotswold Air Show, formerly known as the Kemble Air Show, was an airshow held every year at Cotswold Airport (located near the village of Kemble) in Gloucestershire. Attendance grew steadily, with the 2008 event hosting nearly twenty thousand visitors. This increase in the number of visitors led to the rebranding of the event in 2009, which included the show being extended in length from one day to two, held on the weekend of 20 June.

The event was one of three annual air shows that took place at Cotswold Airport, along with the Great Vintage Flying Weekend in May and the Battle of Britain Airshow in September. The two other events were held towards the northern edge of the airport, whilst the Cotswold Air Show was held towards the southern edge of the site, allowing for a much larger showground.

The Red Arrows, the aerobatics display team of the Royal Air Force, were initially based at the aerodrome, and the airport is known as the team's "spiritual home". Because of this heritage, the event is one of the few airshows in the United Kingdom that receives special support from the Royal Air Force, as a 'Priority 1' event.

Unlike many other air shows, where the flying displays continue uninterrupted, the flying displays at the Cotswold Air Show are stopped in the middle of the day for a lunch break. The event became well known among aviation enthusiasts for flypasts of aircraft in unusual formations, which became known as "Kemble Moments".

In 2009, aircraft belonging to the US Air Force appeared for the first time at the event. The year also saw the debut of the restored Vulcan bomber, a project that cost over £6m over 15 years. In 2010, the event commemorated the 70th anniversary of the Battle of Britain, featuring aircraft including the Supermarine Spitfire and the Hawker Hurricane. The event was held to raise money for the Royal Air Force Benevolent Fund.

2010 also featured a display named 'O'Brien's Flying Circus', which on the second display was not carried out successfully. The pilot of a light aircraft was meant to land on a trailer, but because of crosswinds, after multiple attempts they were unable to do and made a conventional landing on the runway. The event also featured aircraft from the Battle of Britain, featuring pyrotechnics and audio effects.

The last Cotswold Air Show was held at Kemble in 2011, although a smaller 'Best of British' event was held in 2012.
