= Williams Holdings =

- Industry: Conglomerate
- Founded: 1982
- Defunct: 2000
- Fate: Demerged
- Successor: Chubb; Kidde
- Headquarters: Derby, United Kingdom
- Key people: Sir Nigel Rudd (co founder and chairman); Roger Carr (CEO); Brian McGowan (co founder)

Williams Holdings was a major British conglomerate. It was listed on the London Stock Exchange, and was a constituent of the FTSE 100 Index.

== History ==
The company was established by Nigel Rudd and Brian McGowan in Derby in 1982 to acquire under performing businesses. Its first major acquisition was J & HB Jackson, a Coventry based metal business, in 1985.

The company went to acquire Walpamur, a paints business, from Reed International in 1987, and Berger, Jenson and Nicholson, another paints business, from Hoechst AG in 1988. The two businesses were combined to create Crown Berger.

The vehicle division, which operated nineteen car dealerships, was demerged as Pendragon PLC in November 1989.

Williams Holdings bought Pilgrim House in the United States (owners of Kidde) for £331m in 1988 and Yale & Valor, a locks and gas fires business, in 1991.

It started to focus on security in the 1990s, selling its paints business to Nobels Industries in 1990. In February 1997, it bought Chubb Security for $US2.1 billion. It changed its name to Williams plc in 1998 and sold Yale Lock Company to Assa Abloy in March 2000.

== Demerging ==
The company demerged into Chubb and Kidde in July 2000.
