= The Pyrene Company Limited =

British firefighting equipment company

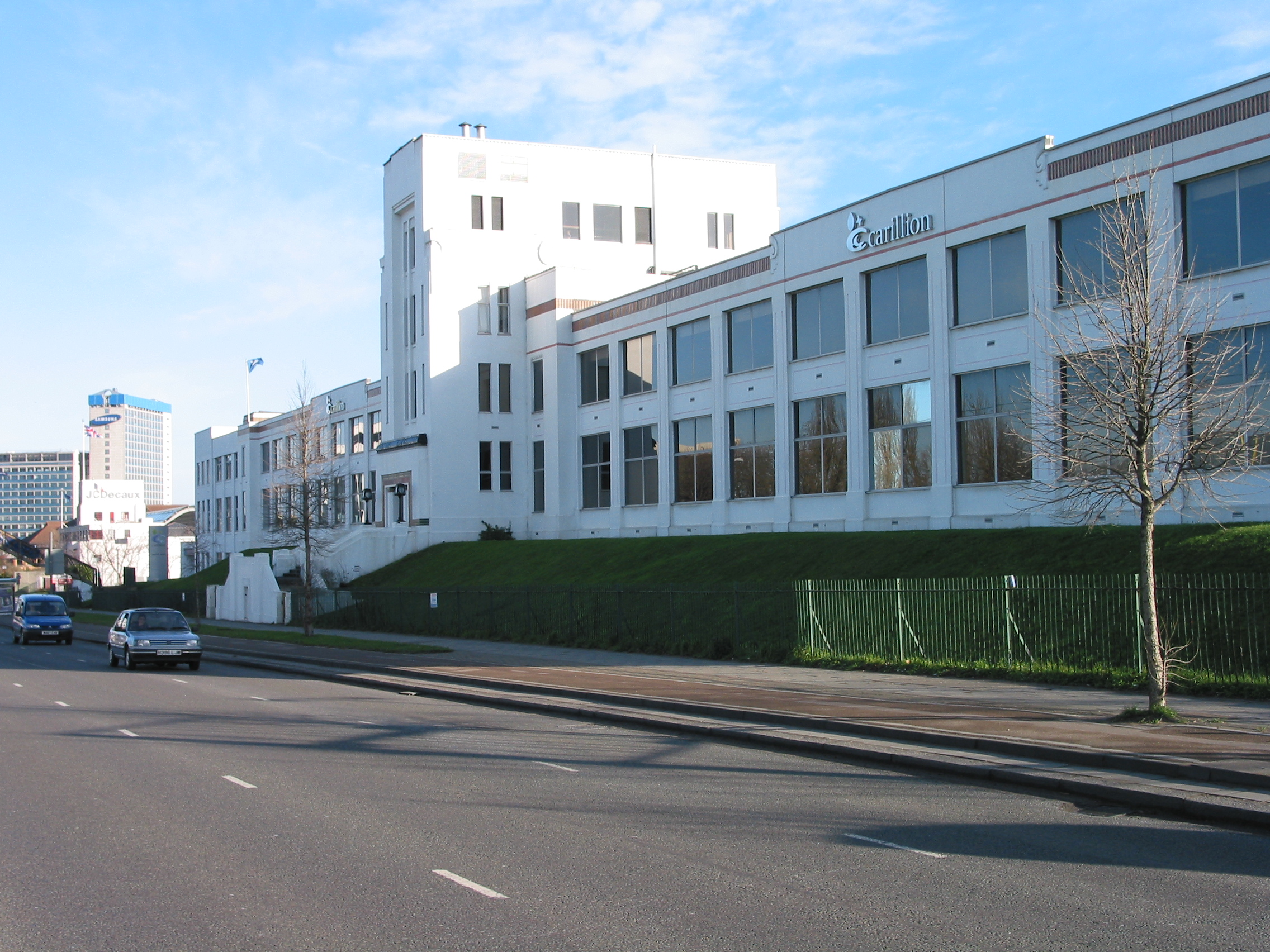
- The former Pyrene Company Building, Great West Road, Brentford
- Type: Manufacturer
- Industry: Health and safety
- Founded: 1914; 112 years ago in London, England
- Founder: Wallace B. Phillips
- Defunct: 1971
- Successor: Chubb Fire Security
- Products: Fire extinguishers

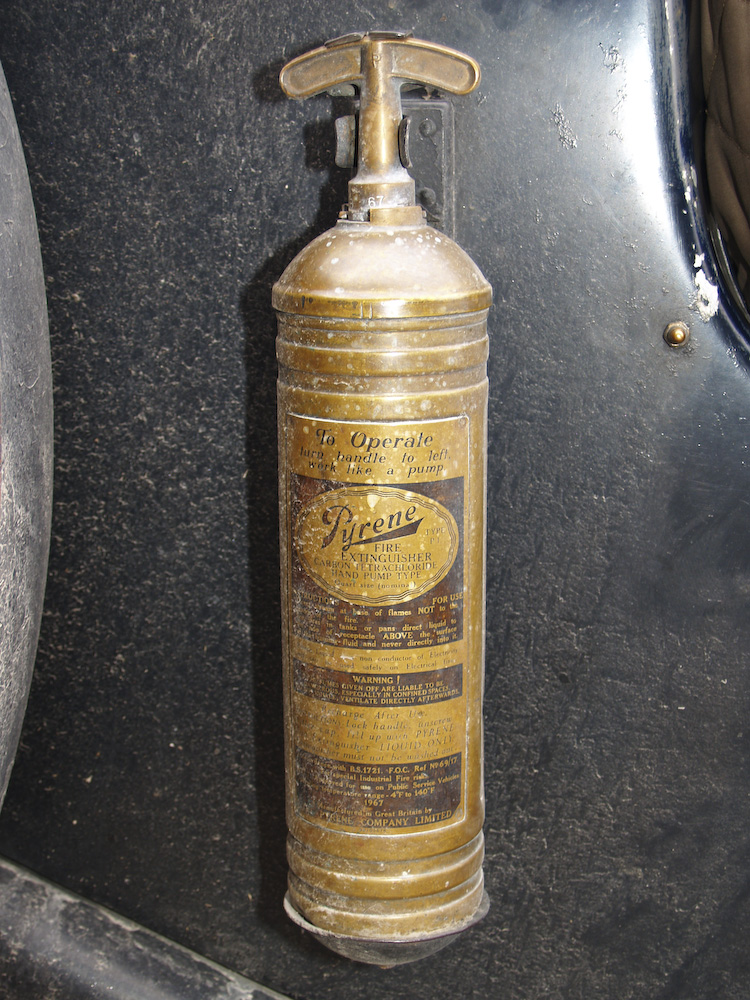
Carbon tetrachloride pump fire extinguisher

The Pyrene Company Limited from their beginning in 1914, until 1971 when they became Chubb Fire Security Limited, were among the world's leaders in the manufacture of fire fighting equipment. The name Pyrene was epitomised by their famous 'pump' extinguisher which was installed on public transport, commercial and private vehicles throughout the western world.

== Company history ==
In 1907, a Scottish engineer, unable to get financial backing in the UK, took his idea for a fire extinguisher to the US. He established what became known as the Pyrene Company of Delaware in 1909.

A British offshoot, The Pyrene Company Limited was founded in 1914 when Wallace B. Phillips, an American businessman, set up in Great Queen Street, London, selling 'pump' extinguishers. The company moved to Grosvenor Gardens, London in 1918, and then to Stoke Newington in 1920, where a factory to manufacture soda-acid and foam fire extinguishers was established.

The London General Omnibus Company awarded Pyrene the contract for its fire extinguishers in 1924.

In 1927, a metal-finishing division was established, which developed the Parkerizing process for metal rust-proofing. Its Pyrene Company Limited sold part of the chemical division to the Brent International Chemical Company which was a stand-alone specialty chemical company who manufactured a variety of industrial cleaning compounds. Pyrene only retained rights to manufacture the off patent firefighting chemicals. Brent continued to manufacture the firefighting chemicals globally for Pyrene for several years until Pyrene redeveloped the chemistry side of their business. Brent America was sold to Oakite and was later acquired by Chemetall GMBH.

Pyrene moved to a new Art Deco style factory in 1930, located on the Great West Road, Brentford and established the concept of major fire demonstrations with the construction of a large demonstration ground alongside the Brentford factory, to simulate an oil storage depot. The factory, now known as Westlink House, is a Grade II listed building.

Pyrene Phomene installations were fitted to many ships during the 1930s, and the 'car bumper' division became well established and by 1960 was producing approximately one third of the car bumpers used in the UK motor industry.

1931 saw the company's equipment providing protection for such events as Brooklands, the RAF Pageant Hendon, and the Tidworth and Aldershot Tattoos.

The liner Queen Mary was protected by the installation of a Pyrene foam fire-fighting system in 1933.

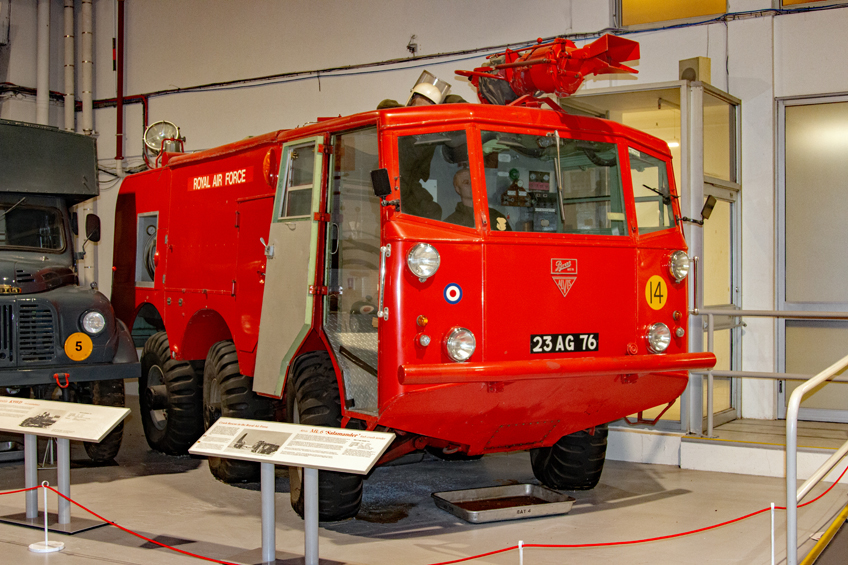
Alvis Mk6 Salamander airport crash tender fitted with Pyrene equipment

During World War II, Pyrene designed and manufactured ARP equipment for ordnance factories, industry and power stations. Expansion was rapid with the wartime demand for fire-fighting equipment, and production of projectiles. A major contract was one from the Air Ministry to supply airfield crash tenders.

In 1950, a new factory was opened in Ferndale, South Wales for the manufacture of fire extinguishers.

The Pyrene Manufacturing Company of Canada, the CO_{2} Equipment Company of Canada and the American Pyrene Company were all acquired during 1953–54. Also in these years the company received commissions from the UK Atomic Energy Authority at Harwell to develop mediums for extinguishing sodium and lithium fires, which they produced under the Pyromet brand-name. The fire extinguisher manufacturer Minimax Limited, was purchased by Pyrene in 1955.

During 1955 the FB5X foam making branch pipe was introduced and the Pyrene ED-HOL system in ships, which recycled the ship's own inert exhaust gases to fight fires in the hold, was developed. Over the years Pyrene fire fighting systems were installed in a number of the world's largest passenger liners including the Queen Elizabeth, Oriana and Empress of Britain. Other important contracts undertaken by the company during the late 1950s included a smoke detection system at the BBC TV Lime Grove Studios in London, smoke detectors for the Bristol Britannia aircraft, CO_{2} fire-fighting systems for a number of British Rail diesel locomotives, and supplying fire detection and CO_{2} systems for Lloyd's of London.

== Pyrene Panorama Ltd ==
Pyrene Panorama Ltd was established in 1959 when Pyrene purchased the business of Panorama Equipment Ltd, which itself dated from 1941. This company was originally formed to manufacture an industrial wide-field vision safety goggle which gave rise to the name "Panorama". Also in 1959, Pyrene acquired Roberts McClean, who in 1931, introduced self-contained compressed air breathing apparatus to the UK and these two companies merged under the Pyrene Panorama brand.

Pyrene was taken over by Chubb and Sons in 1967 and continued to operate under the name Pyrene Panorama. In 1971 Chubb Fire Security Ltd was formed. In that same year a Bristol Britannia aircraft, flown by test pilot Donald Chubb, landed on a carpet of Pyrene foam at Manston.

In 1976 Fireward Ltd, manufacturers since 1964 of plastic-bodied portable dry-powder fire extinguishers, also merged with Pyrene Panorama, to form the new company, Chubb Panorama. A further addition to the group in 1976 was the acquisition of Submarine and Safety Engineering Ltd, specialists in self-contained under-water breathing apparatus and diving equipment. Their "Dominair" range added considerably to the company's comprehensive coverage of safety equipment.

== See also ==
- Chubb Fire & Security
- Chubb Locks
- Read and Campbell Limited
- Minimax Limited
- Rampart Engineering
