= Yale & Valor =

- Industry: Locks and gas fires
- Founded: 1890; 136 years ago
- Defunct: 1991
- Fate: Acquired by Williams Holdings
- Successor: Baxi Group plc Assa Abloy
- Headquarters: Birmingham, United Kingdom

Yale & Valor was a company in Birmingham that manufactured locks and gas fires. It was listed on the London Stock Exchange.

== History ==
In 1890, the Valor Company Ltd. was formed in Birmingham for manufacturing oil storage cabinets. Later it diversified into paraffin and subsequently gas heaters. The company merged with the Yale Lock Company becoming Yale & Valor in 1987 and then with Myson plc in 1989. The company was listed on the London Stock Exchange from 1989 to 1991.

The company was bought by Williams Holdings in September 1991, and subsequently spun off with the other brands to form Newmond plc in August 1996. The Valor brand is now owned in Europe by Baxi Group Ltd, (formed by the merger of Baxi Holdings Plc and Newmond plc) and the Yale Lock Company is now a subsidiary of Assa Abloy.

The right to design and manufacture Valor branded products in North America, as of 2001, is controlled by Miles Industries Ltd. a Canadian privately owned firm.

== See also ==
- Yale-Cady Octagon House and Yale Lock Factory Site
