= Yale-Cady Octagon House and Yale Lock Factory Site =

Historic house in New York, United States

- U.S. National Register of Historic Places
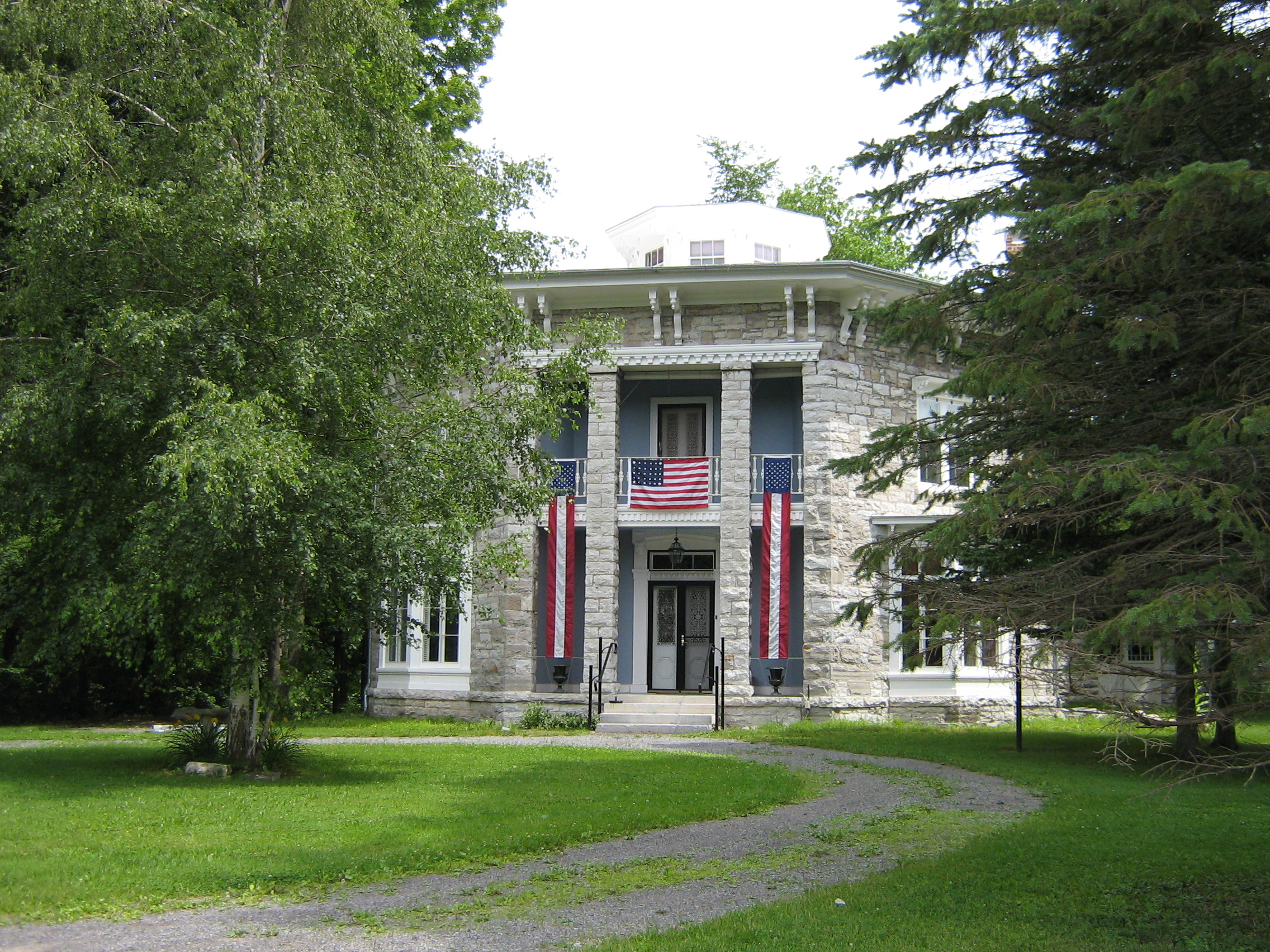
- The Yale-Cady Octagon House

- Location within New York Location within the United States
- Location: 7550 N. Main St., Newport (village), New York
- Coordinates: 43°11′34″N 75°1′6″W
- Built: 1849
- Architectural style: Italianate: Octagon Mode
- NRHP reference No.: 07001019
- Added to NRHP: September 29, 2007

The Yale-Cady Octagon House and Yale Lock Factory Site is a private residence at 7550 North Main Street in Newport, New York, comprising an historic octagonal house and the adjoining site of the lock factory of Linus Yale, Sr. and his son Linus Yale, Jr., the inventor of the cylinder lock and the founders of the Yale Lock company.

Linus Yale, Sr., built the house in 1849 as a gift for his daughter, Chlothilda, who had married Ira L. Cady on July 8, 1839, father of architect Merton Yale Cady. Currently, the house is a private residence and the Yale Lock Factory is in ruins.

It was listed on the National Register of Historic Places in 2007.

It is a property with several interesting details, including overhanging eaves with pairs of curvilinear brackets, cupola and bay windows which are typical of the Italianate style.

== See also ==
- Yale & Valor
