= George Foreman Grill =

Portable electrically heated grill

George Foreman Lean Mean Fat-Reducing Grilling Machine
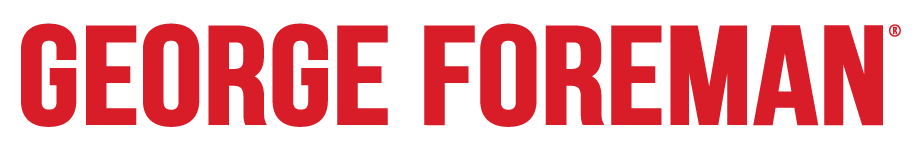
- Inventor: Michael Boehm, Robert Johnson
- Inception: 1994; 32 years ago
- Manufacturer: Spectrum Brands
- Available: United States, United Kingdom, Ireland, Canada, Australia
- Website: George Foreman U.S.A. George Foreman UK

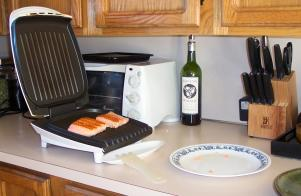
A George Foreman Grill

The George Foreman Lean Mean Fat-Reducing Grilling Machine, also commonly referred to as simply the George Foreman grill, is a portable double-sided electrically heated grill manufactured by Spectrum Brands. It was promoted by two-time world heavyweight boxing champion George Foreman. Since its introduction in 1994, over 100 million George Foreman grills have been sold worldwide.

== History ==
The concept for the grill was created by Michael Boehm of Batavia, Illinois. The original intention was to create an indoor grill that cooked on both sides at once. A second key benefit was to reduce the fat content of hamburgers and other meats by draining away the fat into a separate reservoir. Boehm designed the product with a floating hinge and slanted grilling surface to accommodate foods of differing thicknesses and drain fat away from the food. Engineering work was performed by Bob Johnson. Boehm and Johnson brought a JVC camcorder and a sample of the product in bright yellow to the office of Barbara Westfield at Salton, Inc. The video was played, showing fat dripping from the grill into the collection tray. They presented the product as "The Fajita Express". The fajita grill had been promoted at industry trade shows in the early 1990s, but garnered little interest.

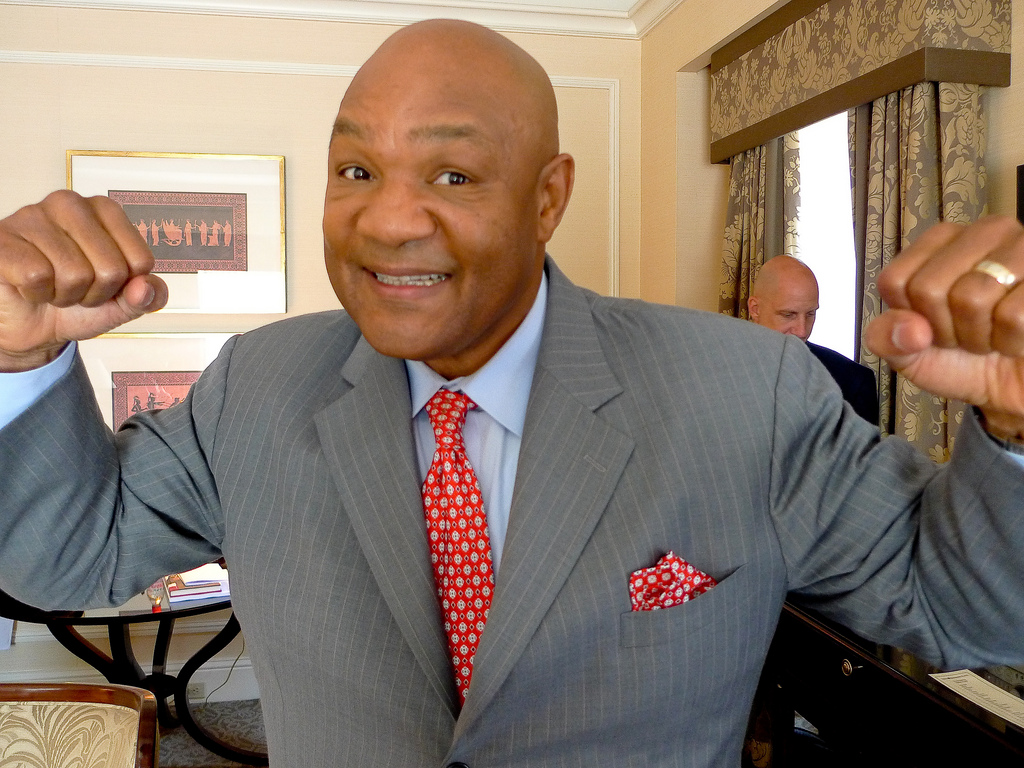
Foreman in 2009

The slanted grill concept was pitched by Tsann Kuen to Salton, Inc. After one year, and several trade shows, Salton sent samples of the grill to George Foreman's colleagues, who then sent the grill to Foreman to test. Boehm was not involved in teaming up the grill and Foreman. Salton made several changes to the technical function of the product, removing the four risers meant for the user to lift up the grill, slide in one of the two included trays, and fill taco shells. One tray was for grease from fajita meat, and the second tray was to hold a taco shell, as was shown in the demonstration to Westfield in the original presentation at the Salton office in Mount Prospect, Illinois.

The Lean Mean Fat-Reducing Grilling Machine, as it became known, was introduced in 1994 and promoted with distinctive infomercials which featured Foreman. A combination of his affable personality and the unique features of the product made it a huge success. Such was the popularity of these infomercials that Foreman's tagline, "It's so good I put my name on it!", is now part of popular culture.

== Design ==
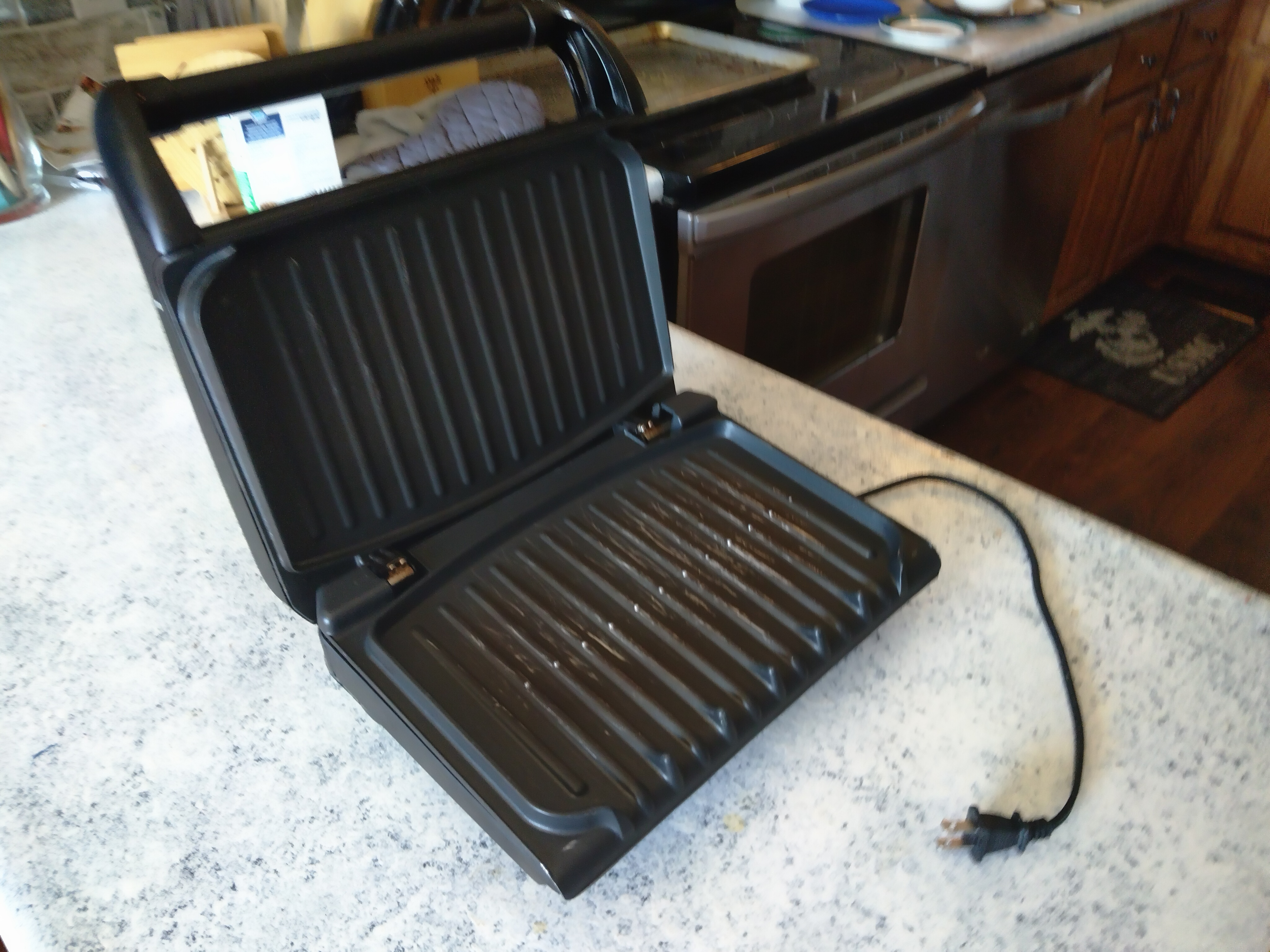
A George Foreman Grill

The product has a clamshell design that simultaneously heats the top and bottom surfaces of the food, eliminating the need to flip it. Each heating surface is grooved to reduce contact area, and covered in a non-stick coating. The lower heating surface is angled to allow hot, liquid fat and other fluids to drain through the grooves into a removable drip tray, which shows the amount removed from the food. This arrangement has been marketed as a way to "knock out the fat", suggesting a healthier way to cook.

The grill is offered in various sizes for cooking individual or multiple servings. In 2006, the George Foreman "Next Grilleration" Health Grill was launched, featuring detachable grilling plates for easier cleaning. It has gone through several other versions, differing in their control interfaces and design.

In 2014, an updated Foreman Grill was released called the "Evolve Grill". The Evolve grill features interchangeable PTFE-free ceramic plates. The plates available are the traditional grill plates, waffle plates, a bake dish, mini burgers, a flat griddle, and a muffin pan.

== Reception ==
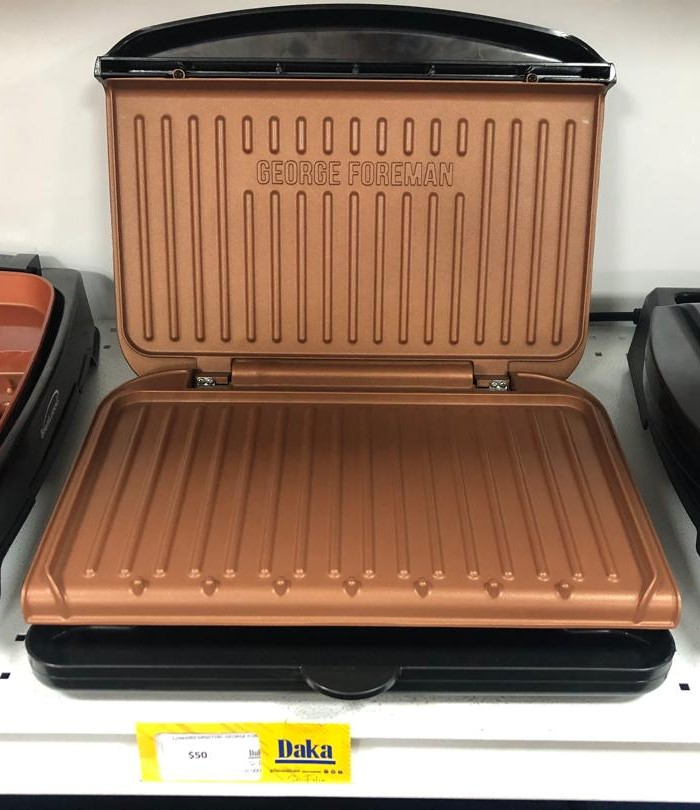
Grill displayed inside a store located in Caracas, Venezuela.

The worldwide popularity of the George Foreman grill has resulted in sales of over 100 million units since it was first launched, a feat that was achieved in a little over 15 years. Although Foreman never confirmed exactly how much he earned from the endorsement, Salton, Inc. paid him $138 million in 1999 in order to buy out the right to use his name. Previous to that he was being paid about 40 percent of the profits on each grill sold, earning him $4.5 million a month at its peak, so it is estimated he made a total of over $200 million from the endorsement, a sum that is substantially more than he earned as a boxer.

== Competition ==
The success of the George Foreman Grill spawned a variety of similar celebrity-endorsed products, such as the Evander Holyfield Real Deal Grill, for which Holyfield starred in a 2007 infomercial, and the Carl Lewis Health Grill. None of these imitators, however, achieved the level of success of the Foreman Grill. The Jackie Chan Grill is the same grill as the George Foreman grill, but targets the Asian market, and has been marketed by both Chan and Foreman.

== Hogan's debunked story ==
Professional wrestler Hulk Hogan famously claimed that he was the first choice for the grill but missed out because he did not answer his phone. However, the story has been heavily debunked by the product's creators. Hogan said he was busy picking up his kids from school, and by the time he returned the call, his agent told him that because he was unavailable, the grill had already been given to George Foreman. Hogan told the story over the years, including on his reality show Hogan Knows Best. The family of Michael Boehm, said the story was inaccurate and that Foreman was the only celebrity ever approached for the endorsement. Hogan eventually launched the Hulk Hogan Ultimate Grill, which was later recalled due to fire hazards.

== See also ==
- Pie iron – Cooking appliance
- Waffle iron – Device used to cook waffles
