= Lee R. Anderson Sr. =

American businessman and philanthropist (born 1939)

- Born: Lee Reuben Anderson Sr. June 22, 1939 (age 87); Minneapolis, Minnesota, U.S.
- Education: United States Military Academy (B.S.)
- Years active: 1964-present
- Spouse: Penny Anderson (m. 1965)
- Children: 2

Lee Reuben Anderson Sr. (born June 22, 1939) is an American businessman and philanthropist. He was the owner and chairman of the Minnesota-based APi Group, a holding company for numerous construction and fire-protection firms. His charitable interests include children's health, higher education, and the welfare of American military veterans.

== Biography ==
Anderson, an only child, was born in Minneapolis, Minn., and attended the private Breck School, then in St. Paul. A lifelong outdoorsman, he spent much of his boyhood at the family home in the Brainerd lakes area north of the Twin Cities. At the urging of his father, a successful plumbing contractor, he enrolled at the United States Military Academy at West Point and played football and basketball. After he graduated in 1961 with a B.S. in civil engineering, Anderson served in the U.S. Army at Luke Air Force Base in Phoenix, Arizona, where he oversaw materials procurement and construction services and was promoted to first lieutenant.

In 1964, Anderson returned to the Twin Cities and took over A.P.I. Inc. (originally Asbestos Products International), an insulation contractor founded in 1926 as a division of his father's plumbing business. After he purchased an industrial fire sprinkler company in 1969, Anderson continued to acquire other firms, primarily in the construction and fire-protection fields. The growing conglomerate was renamed APi Group Inc. in 1997. On October 1, 2019, Anderson sold his interest in APi Group, Inc. to J2 Acquisition Limited, a SPAC co-founded by Sir Martin E. Franklin.

== Bank acquisitions ==
In the late 1970s, Anderson also began to purchase small banks in central and northern Minnesota. In 1997, he sold his banking assets to Norwest Corporation for a reported $75 million in stock. Norwest's subsequent merger with Wells Fargo, in 1998, greatly enhanced the value of the shares Anderson had acquired in the original trade.

== Philanthropy ==
In recent years, Anderson had committed a sizeable amount of his fortune to various charitable causes. In 2005, he and his wife, Penny, gave $60 million to the University of St. Thomas in St. Paul - the largest individual donation ever received by a Minnesota college or university at that time. The Anderson Athletic and Recreation Complex opened on the St. Thomas campus in 2011. In 2023, the couple pledged $75 million for the construction of a multi-use arena on the St. Thomas campus. It is the largest single monetary donation ever made to a Minnesota university. The Lee and Penny Anderson Arena, opened in 2025, is home to the university's men's and women's basketball and hockey teams. In 2003, the Andersons pledged $6 million for the building of the Anderson Rugby Complex at West Point, which was dedicated in May 2007. As frequent contributors to West Point, he and his wife are recognized as the largest donors in the academy's history, in terms of financial support. Since 2002, the Andersons have given $6 million to Children's Hospital Boston for research on a rare form of muscular dystrophy, mini-core myopathy, that afflicts one of their grandchildren.

== Military veterans ==
In 2011, the Andersons donated $2.5 million toward the building of the new Defenders Lodge, a $12.5 million hotel facility for veterans seeking care at the Department of Veterans Affairs hospital in Palo Alto, California. Anderson also pledged to fund the first three years of Hiring Our Heroes, a program launched in 2011 by the U.S. Chamber of Commerce, with support from veteran service organizations, to stage job fairs across the country. The initiative also recognizes firms that have made extraordinary efforts to help wounded service members and other veterans reenter the civilian workforce.

== Private life ==
Lee and Penny Anderson, who married in 1965, maintain homes in Minnesota and in Naples, Florida. They have a son, a daughter, and six grandchildren. Anderson, an avid hunter, is the funder of a conservation education program through the Boone and Crockett Club in the Montana Rockies. The Andersons have also supported the St. David's Relief Foundation, a Texas-based Catholic nonprofit group that has assisted humanitarian efforts in Bosnia-Herzegovina following the Yugoslav Wars (1991–1995). After first visiting nearby Croatia in 2001, the couple subsequently opened a Relais & Chateaux Villa & Winery, Villa Korta Katarina & Winery in Orebić, a seaside village on the Adriatic coast.

He won Best of Show at the 2022 Pebble Beach Concours d'Elegance and then again in 2025.

== Memberships and awards ==
Anderson serves as director and trustee for numerous companies, organizations, outdoor groups, and academic institutions, including Breck School, the University of St. Thomas, and the Naples Children and Education Foundation. He is a director of the US Chamber of Commerce in Washington, D.C.; Pan-O-Gold Baking Company; and a member of the Minnesota Executive Organization, the Chief Executives Organization, and the World Presidents Organization. His recent awards include:

- London Medal for Distinguished Service, Comfort for America's Uniformed Services (Cause), 2018
- Inducted into Horatio Alger Association of Distinguished Americans, 2014
- Received the Distinguished Service Award from the Military Officers Association of America, 2014
- Eisenhower Distinguished Citizen Award, 2013
- Distinguished Graduate Award, West Point, 2013
- Joel Labovitz Entrepreneurial Success Lifetime Achievement Award, 2013
- Donor of the Year Award, National Association of Athletic Directors, 2011
- Saint Elizabeth Ann Seton Award, National Catholic Educational Association, 2010
- Minnesota's Outstanding Individual Philanthropist Award, American Fundraising Professionals, 2010
- Ernst & Young Entrepreneur of the Year Award in real estate, hospitality, and construction, 2009
- Minnesota Business Hall of Fame inductee, 2008
- Honorary Doctorate of Law, University of St. Thomas, 2005
- John F. Cade Award for Entrepreneurial Excellence, John M. Morrison Center for Entrepreneurship, University of St. Thomas, 2002
- L.B. Hartz Professional Achievement Award, Minnesota State University Moorhead College of Business and Industry, 2002

== Reuben Anderson ==
Reuben Anderson, Lee Anderson's father, was the plumbing contractor for the White House renovation project in 1951. As noted by the historian David McCullough, President Harry S. Truman admired a poem by the elder Anderson, posted on the wall of the head engineer's temporary headquarters on the South Lawn.
