= Benjamin Bowen House =

Historic house in New York, United States

- U.S. National Register of Historic Places
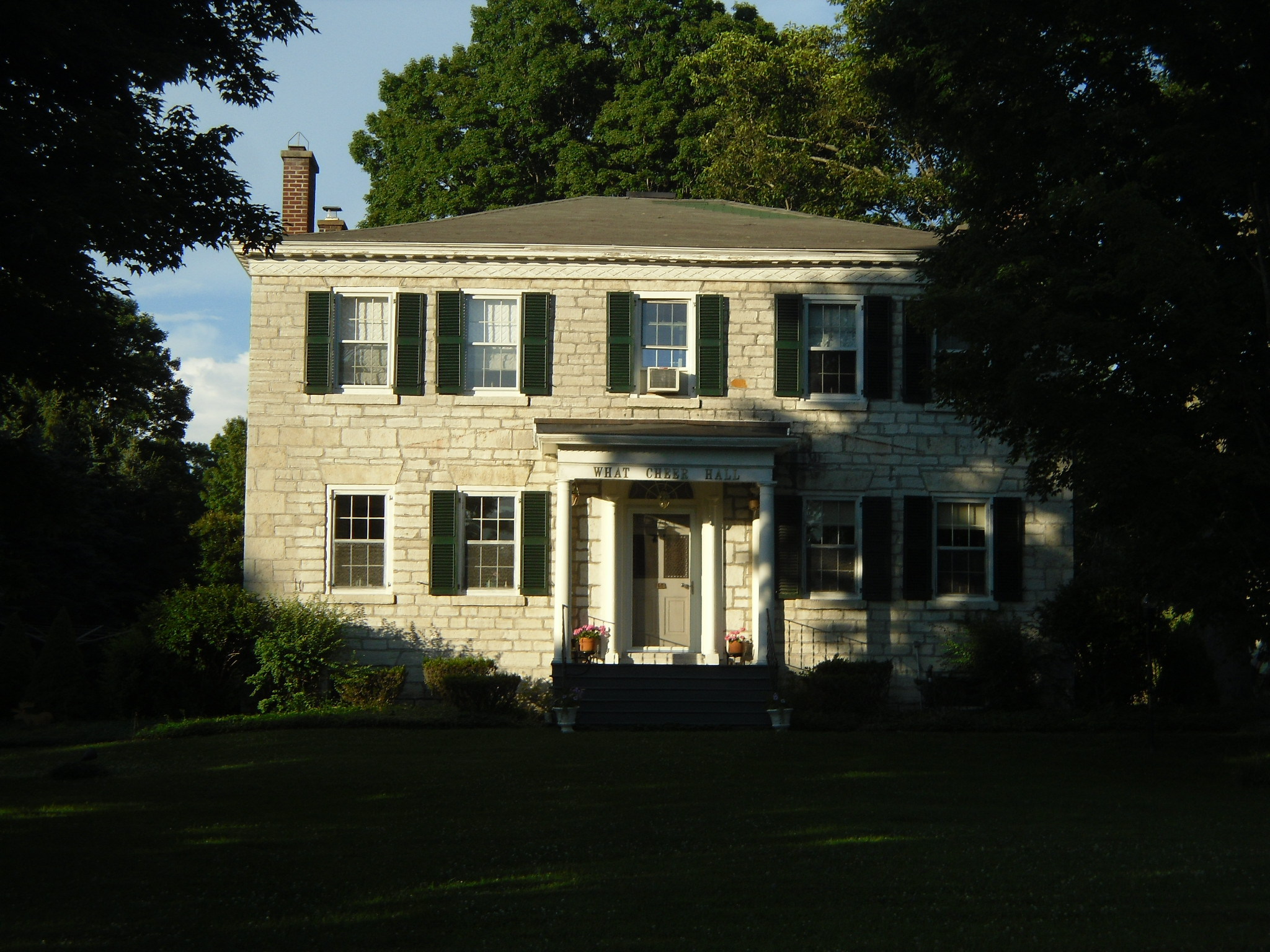
- Benjamin Bowen House, July 2010

- Location within New York Location within the United States
- Location: 7482 Main St., Newport, New York
- Coordinates: 43°11′16″N 75°3′9″W
- Area: 1.3 acres (0.53 ha)
- Built: 1812
- Architectural style: Federal
- NRHP reference No.: 98001342
- Added to NRHP: November 5, 1998

The Benjamin Bowen House (also known as What Cheer Hall) is a historic house located at 7482 Main Street in Newport, Herkimer County, New York.

== Description and history ==
It is a two-story, nearly square limestone block residence in the Federal style, and was built in 1812 by Benjamin Bowen (1759-1824) who came from Rhode Island with the financial backing of his brothers, Dr. William Bowen and Ephraim Bowen Esq. to establish a saw mill, a grist mill, a distillery, and the Newport Cotton Manufacturing Co. along the banks of the West Canada Creek using a dam and diversion canal. Bowen left Newport for Tennessee after suffering financial losses in 1815. His daughter, Lydia, eventually acquired the property and it was subsequently passed down through the generations through her oldest stepson, Standish Barry Jr., until 1944. Since then the house has had a new family about every ten years.

The property was listed on the National Register of Historic Places on November 5, 1998. Also on the property is a stone smokehouse.
