= Chubb Fire & Security =

British multinational company

- Trade name: Chubb Limited
- Type: Subsidiary
- Industry: Asset Protection; Life Safety
- Founded: 1818; 208 years ago
- Founders: Charles Chubb; Jeremiah Chubb
- Headquarters: Blackburn, England
- Area served: Austria; Australia; Belgium; Canada; China; Dubai; France; Germany; Hong Kong; India; Ireland; Netherlands; New Zealand; Singapore; Spain; Switzerland; United Kingdom
- Key people: Andrew White, CEO; Brendan McNulty, VP Europe; KT Yiu, VP Asia Pacific
- Number of employees: 12,000+ (2023)
- Parent: APi Group Corporation
- Subsidiaries: Delta Security Solutions; Security Monitoring Centre; SK Fire Safety Group; Somati Systems; Vipond Fire Protection; VitalCALL
- Website: chubbfs.com

Chubb Fire & Security is a British multinational company that provides property protection and life safety equipment and services, including fire protection and security systems. It has been a subsidiary of APi Group Corporation since January 2022.

== History ==
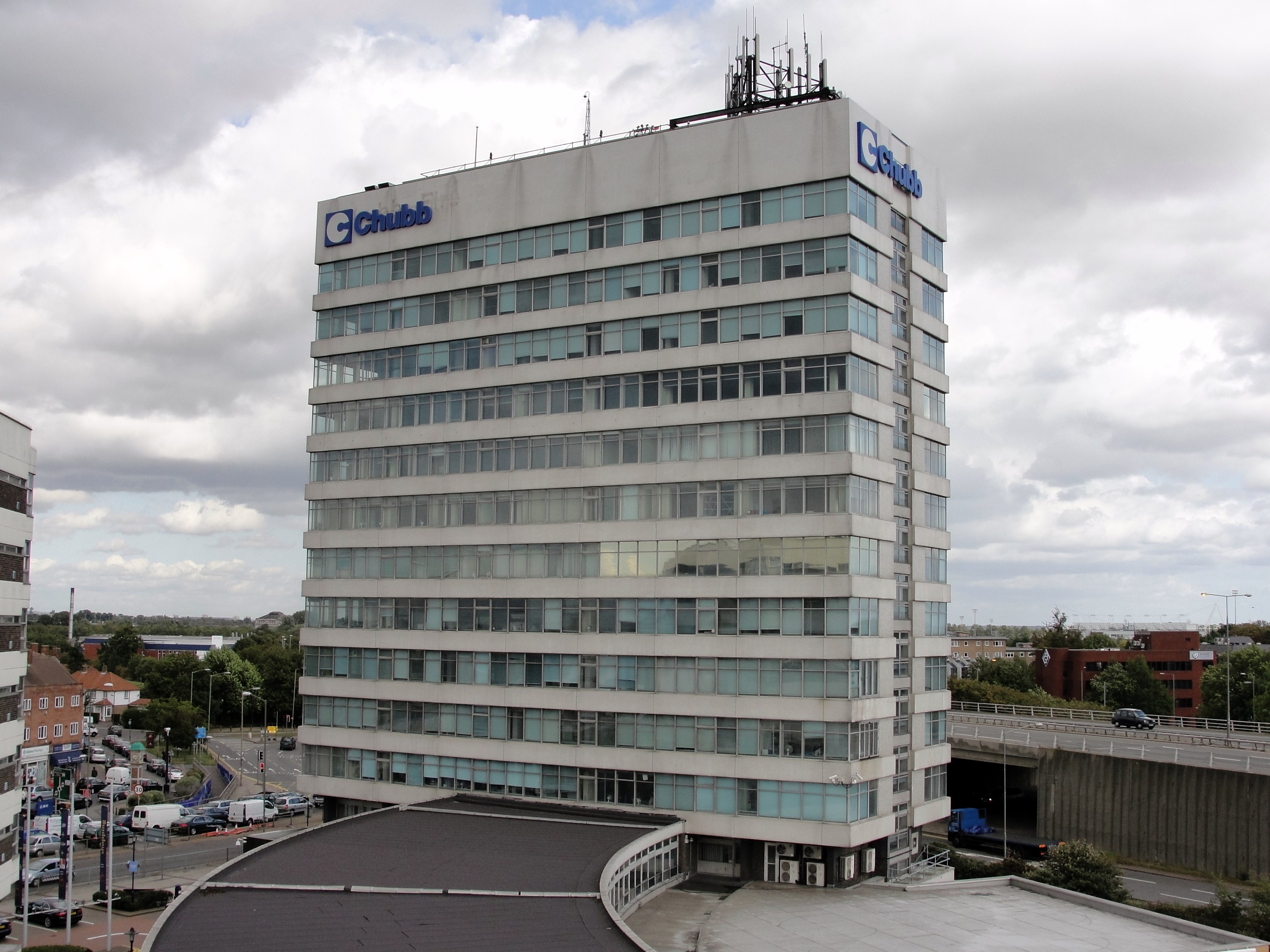
Former office in Sunbury-on-Thames

The company was founded by Charles and Jeremiah Chubb, who patented their Chubb detector lock in 1818. The company won a government competition for a lock which could not be opened other than by its own key.

In 1835, the company produced its first Chubb safe at its factory in Wolverhampton, UK and, in the second half of the 19th century, the company expanded into the United States, and produced a time lock that was fitted to bank vaults across the country. In the 1800s, Chubb gained some important customers such as the Duke of Wellington and the Bank of England.

Over the next one hundred years, the company turned out more than 2.5m locks. By the 1940s, Chubb expanded its operations in 17 countries. From being a single company manufacturing specialized security products it turned into a broad-based group of companies covering not only many aspects of security but fire protection as well.

The company went on to acquire a number of rival firms including Chatwood-Milner Ltd. (1958), Burgot Alarms Ltd and Rely-a-Bell (1962), Read and Campbell Limited (1964), Josiah Parkes and Sons Ltd. (1965) and The Pyrene Company Limited (1967). It was bought by Racal Electronics in August 1984, from which it was demerged in September 1992, before being acquired by Williams Holdings in February 1997. as the latter company sought to build a security-focused conglomerate. Chubb was again demerged in July 2000.

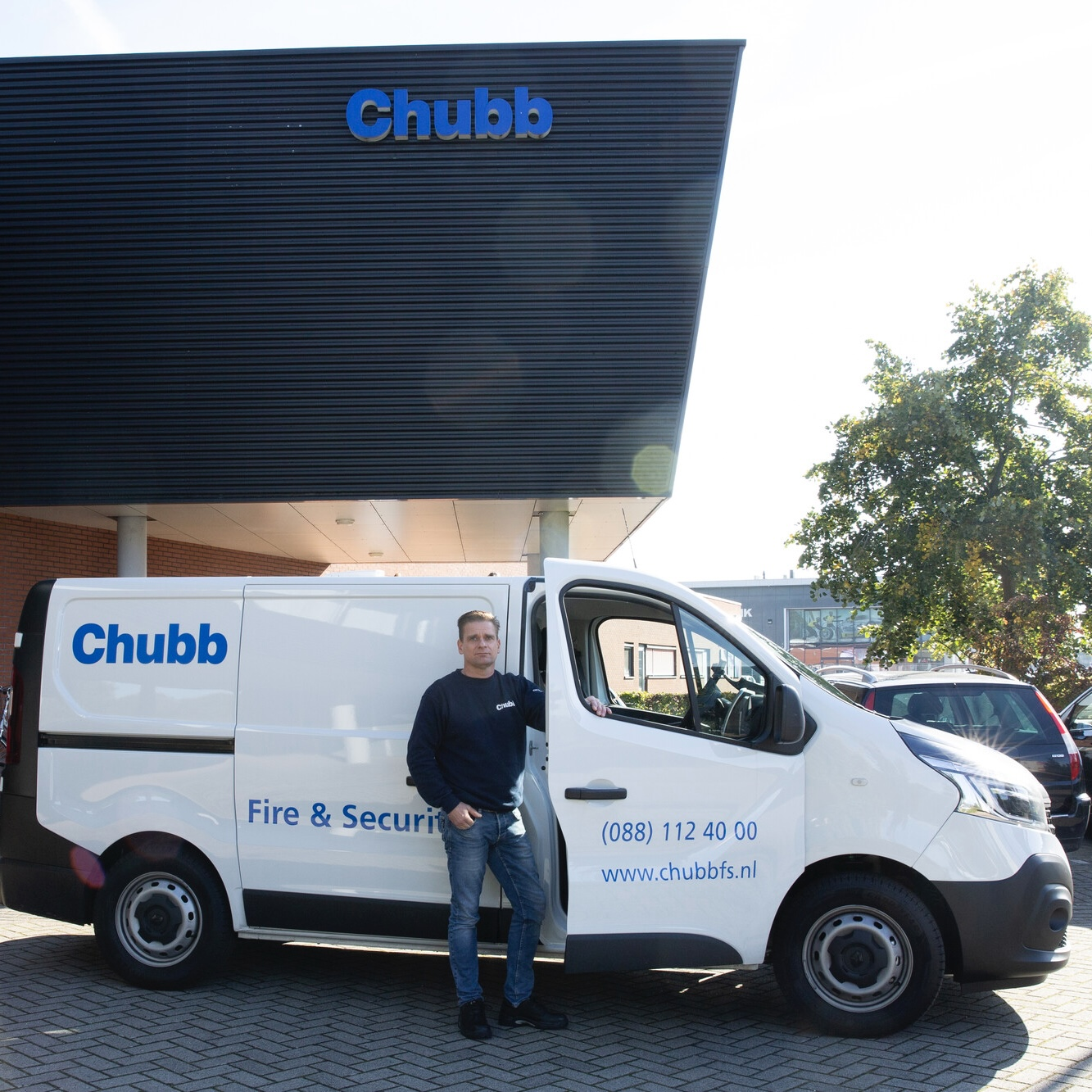
Service Engineer van in 2021

In August 2000, Chubb sold Chubb Locks, its lock and safe making unit, to Assa Abloy, and concentrated on security systems such as door access and CCTV systems. In May 2002, Chubb held intensive acquisitions talks with Sweden-based Securitas AB, the world's biggest security services business. After 18 months of negotiations, the talks were called off on the grounds that the deal would not be "financially attractive" to either company's shareholders.

In Australia, Chubb Security bought MSS Security in 1996, but then sold it to SIS Limited in 2008.

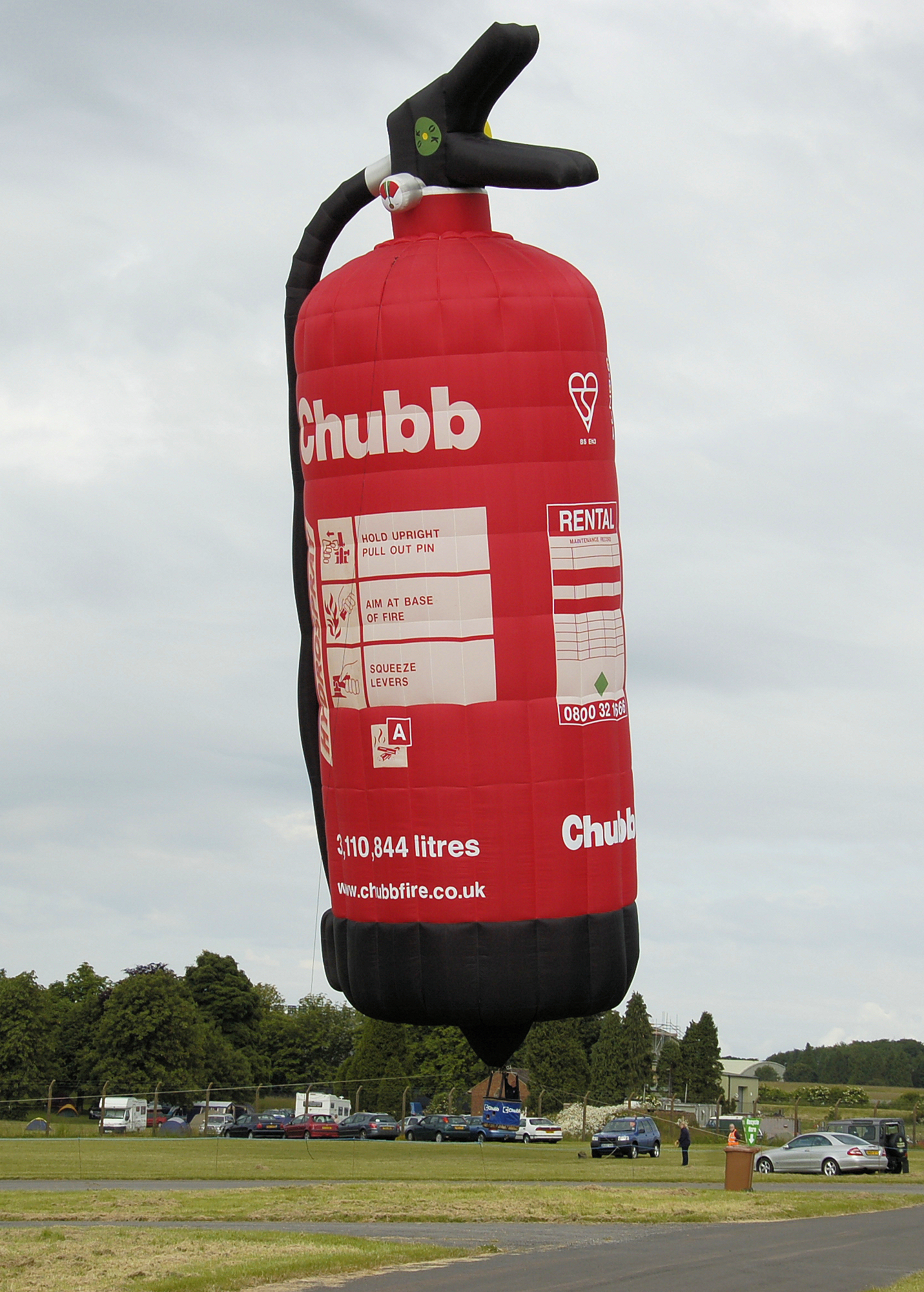
Hot air balloon in the shape of a Chubb fire extinguisher at the 2008 Kemble Air Show

In April 2003, Chubb was acquired for £622m by United Technologies Corporation. In March 2007, UTC bought Initial Fire and Security, the security arm of Rentokil Initial and proceeded to merge the business and its assets with Chubb in UTC Climate, Controls & Security.

In 2009, Chubb New Zealand sold multiple departments to ISS A/S. It followed the 2006 murder of minor Liam Ashley while in a Chubb prison transport van, although a New Zealand Department of Corrections Inspectorate report found that the vast majority of factors were outside the control of Chubb. In December 2013, Chubb's Australian cash in transit business was sold to Prosegur.

In 2020, Chubb was spun off with the rest of UTC Climate, Controls & Security into a separate company, Carrier Global.

During late 2021, the company obtained approved supplier status in the British rail sector via the RISQS (Railway Industry Supplier Qualification Scheme) verification system.

On 3 January 2022 it was announced that Carrier Global had sold the business to APi Group for US$ 3.1 billion.

== Brands ==
- Ajax Brandbeveiliging
- Chubb Delta Security Solutions
- Chubb Sicli (Secours Immédiat Contre L’Incendie)
- Chubb Somati Systems
- Counterforce by SMC
- SMC (Security Monitoring Centre)
- Vipond Fire Protection
- VitalCALL

== See also ==
- Chubb Locks
- Chubbsafes
