= Chubb (surname) =

Chubb is a surname. Notable people with the surname include:

== A ==
- Adam Chubb (born 1981), American basketball player
- Andrew Chubb (born 1975), Australian pianist, composer, teacher, and lecturer

== B ==
- Basil Chubb (1921–2002), English-born Irish political scientist
- Bradley Chubb (born 1996), American football player

== C ==
- Caldecot Chubb (born 1950), American film producer
- Cecil Chubb (1876–1934), previous owner of Stonehenge
- Charles Chubb (businessman) (1779–1846), British lock and safe manufacturer, the founder of Chubb Locks
- Charles Chubb (ornithologist) (1851–1924), British ornithologist
- Charles Chubb, 2nd Baron Hayter (1871–1967), British businessman
- Charles E. Chubb (1845–1930), Australian judge of the Supreme Court of Queensland

== G ==
- Geoff Chubb (1911–1982), South African cricketer
- George Chubb, 1st Baron Hayter (1848–1946), British businessman
- George Chubb, 3rd Baron Hayter KCVO CBE (1911–2003), British industrialist and politician

== H ==
- Hendon Chubb (1874–1960), American insurance executive

== I ==
- Ian Chubb (born 1943), Vice-chancellor of the Australian National University

== J ==
- Jeremiah Chubb (1793–1860), British inventor of the Chubb detector lock, brother of businessman Charles Chubb
- John Chubb (artist) 1746–1818, English amateur artist of Bridgwater, Somerset.
- John Chubb (locksmith) (1816–1872), British lock and safe manufacturer

== L ==
- Lawrence Chubb (1873–1948), British environmentalist

== M ==
- Mary Chubb (1903–2003), British writer and archaeologist
- Melvin F. Chubb Jr. (1934–2014), United States Air Force lieutenant general

== N ==
- Nick Chubb (born 1995), American football player

== P ==
- Paul Chubb (1949–2002), Australian film and television actor

== R ==
- Ralph Chubb (1892–1960), British poet

== T ==
- Thomas Chubb (1679–1747), English Deist philosopher
- Thomas Caldecot Chubb (1834–1887), English-American insurance executive

== W ==
- William Chubb, 4th Baron Hayter (born 1943), British businessman

== Fictional characters ==
- Arthur "Fatboy" Chubb, a character in the soap opera EastEnders
