= John Chubb =

John Chubb may refer to:

- John Chubb (artist) 1746–1818, English amateur artist of Bridgwater, Somerset.
- John Chubb (locksmith) (1816–1872), English locksmith and inventor
- John Chubb (political scientist), see EdisonLearning
- John Chubb of the Chubb baronets
- John D. Chubb, architect, see Ishpeming Carnegie Public Library

== See also ==
- Chubb (disambiguation)
