= Yale Home =

Swedish lock manufacturer

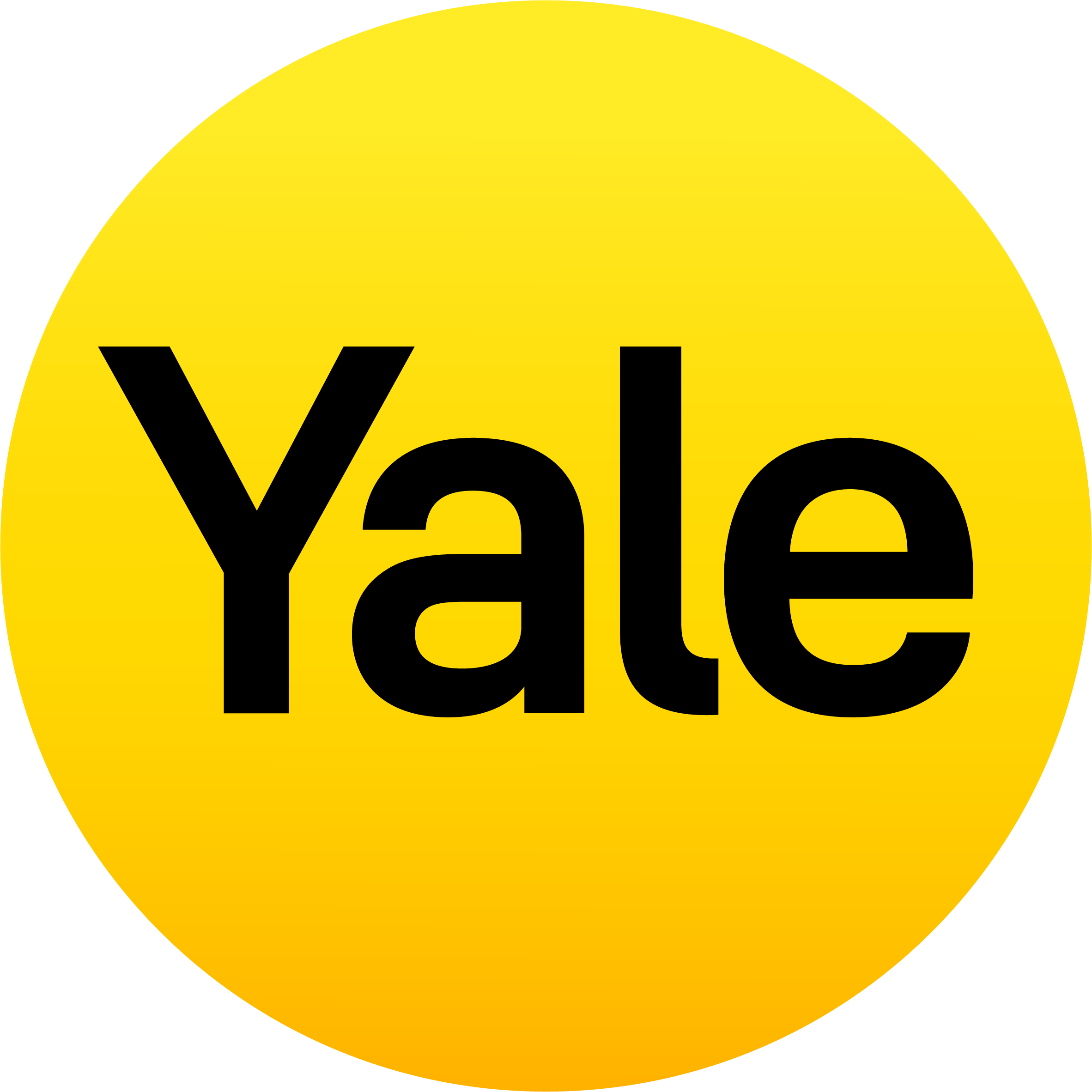
- Type: Subsidiary
- Industry: Locks, Home Security, Burglar Alarms, Safes, Door Viewers, Window Locks, Smart digital locks, IP-cameras, Padlocks
- Founded: 1840; 186 years ago in Stamford, Connecticut, U.S.
- Founder: Linus Yale Jr.
- Headquarters: Stockholm, Sweden, Global
- Parent: Assa Abloy; Fortune Brands Innovations (US & Canada)
- Website: yalehome.com shopyalehome.com (US & Canada)

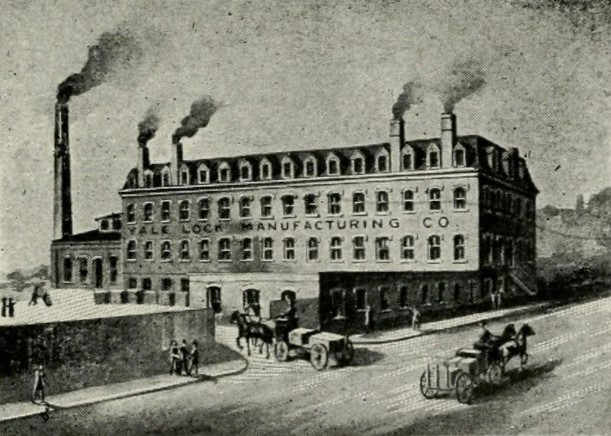
Factory of Yale & Towne Manufacturing Co., 1873

Yale Home, also known as Yale, is a lock manufacturer and a subsidiary of Assa Abloy, except in the United States and Canada where the brand has been owned by Fortune Brands Innovations since 2023. The global company is headquartered in Stockholm, Sweden. Its initial product was the Yale lock, invented by Linus Yale Sr., and it became the foundation of the enterprise founded by Linus Yale Jr. and Henry R. Towne.

Its markets were initially in the United States, and expanded across the globe during the Industrial Revolution, with a workforce of over 12,000 employees.

== History ==
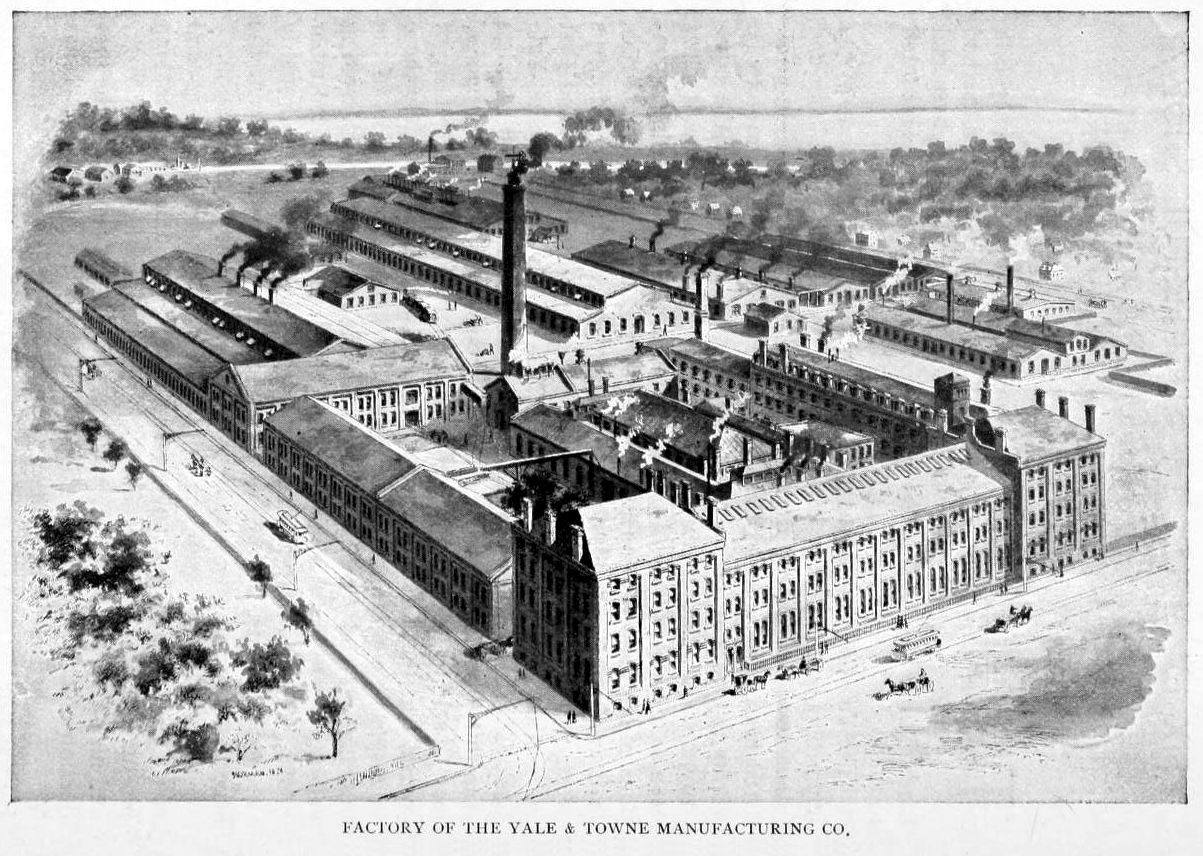
Yale & Towne Manufacturing Co, 1897

In 1868, the business was established in Stamford, Connecticut, by Henry R. Towne and Linus Yale Sr., an inventor renowned for creating the pin tumbler lock. Initially known as Yale Lock Manufacturing Co., the company later adopted the name Yale & Towne, with its base in Newport, New York.

Between 1843 and 1857, Yale secured eight patents, encompassing items like the pin tumbler safe lock, safe lock, bank lock, vault, safe door bolt, and padlock, registered with the U.S. Patent and Trademark Office. Around 1876, they expanded their repertoire to include the manufacturing of chain blocks, electric hoists, cranes, and testing machines, establishing themselves as pioneers in the crane-building sector in the United States. By 1880, they had established branches in Philadelphia, Boston and Chicago.

In the early 20th century, the company intensified its international presence and entered the global market through partnerships, mergers, acquisitions, and joint ventures with other industry peers. Furthermore, Yale's workforce expanded to over 12,000 employees, in line with its business growth. Notable board members during this era have included ex-President of Studebaker, Albert Russel Erskine, Congressman Schuyler Merritt, Lt. Col. Walter C. Allen, William Gibson Carey Jr., ex-President of the United States Chamber of Commerce, and others.

In 1920, the company launched a new battery-powered low-lift platform truck, entering the electric forklift trucks market, bringing a number of innovations in the industry, such as the high heat-resistant Class-H silicon insulation in electric motors, brought in the 1930s. This division became the Yale Materials Handling Corporation, later merged with Nacco Industries to become Hyster-Yale Materials Handling.

=== Later history ===
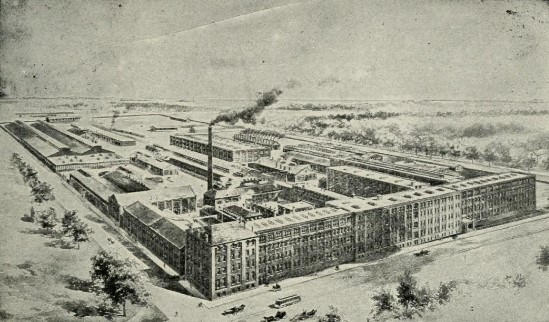
Factory of Yale & Towne Mfg. Co., Stamford, Connecticut, 1903

By 1929, Yale & Towne became the largest locks and door closer manufacturer in the world, and established an exclusive showroom for its products in the newly built Chrysler Building in New York. During World War I, like a number of manufacturers, Yale became involved in arms production. The company started the manufacture of rifle grenades, pumps, fuse-setters, cavalry bits, fasteners, buckles, as well as special parts for mines and gas nozzles for the United States Government.

The enterprise became the largest employer in Stamford, Connecticut, and had branches in the U.S., Canada, and England. As part of their business expansion, Yale entered the British market by acquiring H&T Vaughan, a well-established lock manufacturer located in Wood Street, Willenhall. This acquisition not only solidified Yale's position as the historical hub of the British lock industry but also established them as a major employer in the town.

Subsequently, British Yale ventured into the early motor industry, supplying locks to various manufacturers, particularly following the introduction of the cost-effective diecast-based leaf tumbler technology. From the 1960s onward, security installers widely adopted Yale's "M69" window lock as a straightforward addition to deter theft, especially for vans. This trend persisted until the early 1990s, when electronic security devices superseded these locks.

The company continued to be the sole supplier of all the lock requirements of Rolls-Royce Motors until 1991, when an acrimonious separation occurred. Nonetheless, in 1987, the British Yale's parent company merged it with the Valor Company to establish Yale & Valor. Subsequently, after a takeover by Williams Holdings, certain segments of the Willenhall operation, including the diecasting foundry, were shuttered.

In March 2000, the remaining parts of the British business, notably the Yale Security subsidiaries, were sold to Assa Abloy for over a billion dollars, which was involved in the production of fire alarm systems, burglar alarms, and glass break detectors.

Between July 2012 and the late spring of 2013, Assa Abloy initiated the relocation of Yale's factories from Lenoir City, Tennessee, where they had been based since 1953, to Berlin, Connecticut.

In July 2023, Fortune Brands Innovations acquired the US and Canadian (principally residential) part of the Yale lock business from Assa Abloy, with the US and Canadian commercial product being rebranded as ASSA ABLOY ACCENTRA.

== Historical projects ==
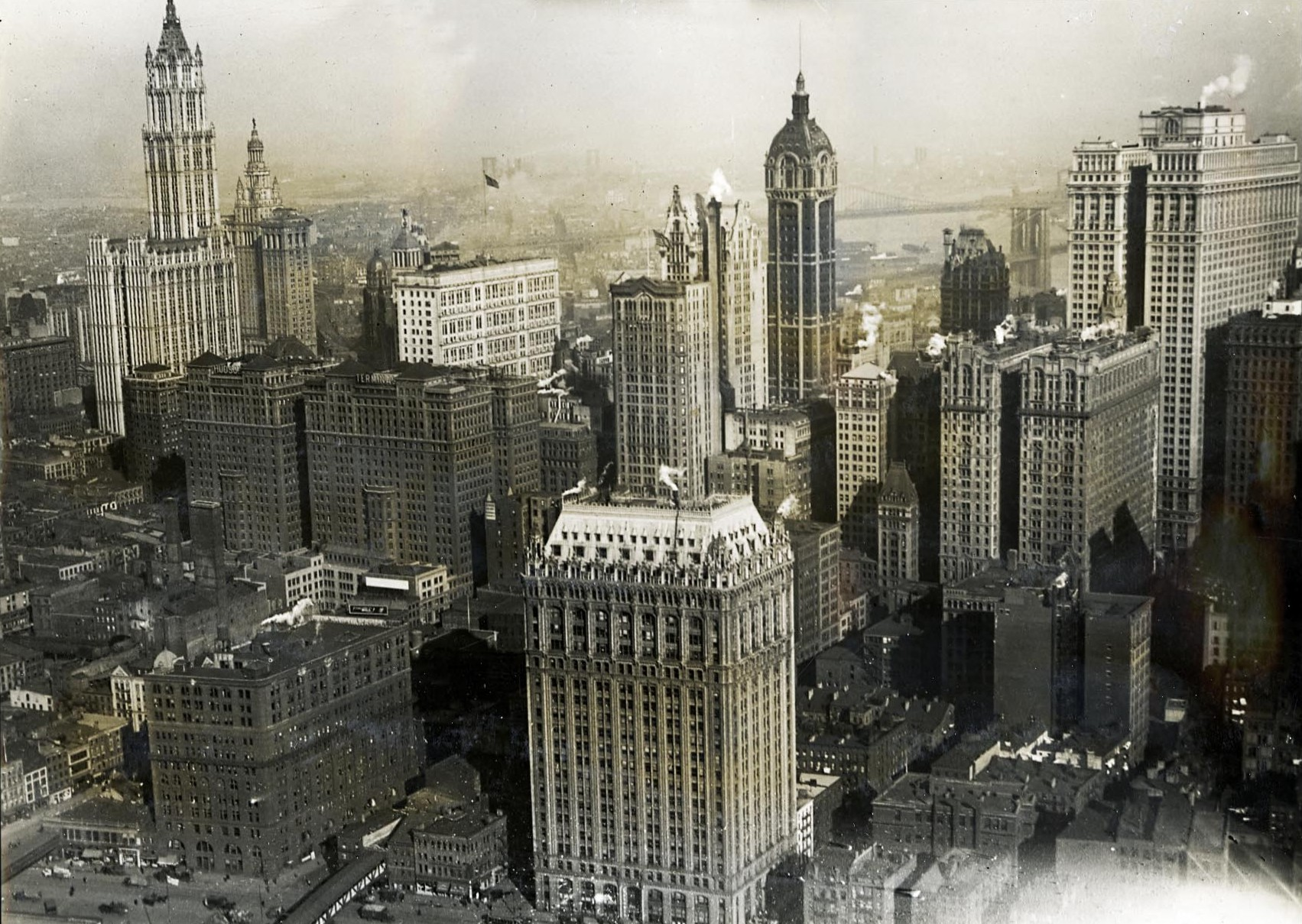
Aerial view of New York City, 1919

Here is a non-exhaustive list of historical projects undertaken by the Yale Lock Company, where they equipped buildings with their locks and hardware:

- Metropolitan Life Insurance Company Tower, the headquarters of the Metropolitan Life Company (1909)
- Woolworth Building, the headquarters of the Woolworth Company (1912)
- New York Life Building, the headquarters of the New York Life Company (1927)
- Lincoln Building, constructed in 1930
- Chrysler Building, the headquarters of the Chrysler Corporation (1930)

== See also ==
- Yale-Cady Octagon House and Yale Lock Factory Site
- Business Technology Association
- Chubb Locks
- Westminster Group
- Hyster-Yale Materials Handling
