= George Chubb, 3rd Baron Hayter =

British industrialist and politician (1911 – 2003)

The Right Honourable The Lord Hayter
- Born: 25 April 1911
- Died: 2 September 2003 (aged 92)
- Education: The Leys School
- Alma mater: Trinity College, Cambridge
- Occupations: Industrialist and politician
- Spouse: Elizabeth Anne Rumbold
- Parent(s): Charles Chubb, 2nd Baron Hayter; Mary Howarth
- Awards: KCVO CBE

George Charles Hayter Chubb, 3rd Baron Hayter KCVO CBE (25 April 1911 – 2 September 2003), was a British industrialist and politician.

Chubb was the son of Charles Chubb, 2nd Baron Hayter (1871–1967), and the great-great-grandson of Charles Chubb (1772–1845), who had founded Chubb and Sons Lock and Safe Co. He was the last family chairman of the company and also a Deputy Speaker of the House of Lords.

== Business career ==
Chubb joined the family firm in 1931 learning the skills of lock-making in the Wolverhampton factory, and then worked in sales at the firm's St James's Street branch. He became managing director in 1941 and chairman in 1957.

He played a major part in the post-war expansion of the company from a highly specialised family concern to a diversified international business. He travelled to Australia, Canada and South Africa to open new businesses. During his chairmanship he oversaw acquisitions and expansion which took Chubb into a broad range of products, including fire protection equipment. The group's workforce grew from 700 to 17,000, in 17 countries. He retired in 1981.

== Politics ==
When he succeeded to the barony in 1967, he sat as a crossbencher in the House of Lords. He made his maiden speech on the role of locks and safes in crime prevention. This was in stark contrast to his father, who had never made a speech in 21 years of attending the House. He became deputy chairman in 1981 after retiring from Chubb.

In 1986 he emerged as a leader of a coalition of peers who opposed the abolition of the Greater London Council. Although unsuccessful this reinforced his position as a deputy chairman (or deputy speaker). He disappeared from the House along with most other hereditary peers following the reforms brought about by the House of Lords Act 1999.

== Awards ==
He was invested as CBE in 1976 and KCVO in 1977.

== Personal life ==
Chubb was educated at The Leys School, and Trinity College, Cambridge, where he read history, graduating in 1932 with an MA. He married Elizabeth Anne Rumbold MBE, only daughter of Thomas Arthur Rumbold and Rosemary Hazel Hampshire, on 28 March 1940. They had four children; the eldest son and heir was Hon. William Chubb, born 9 October 1943. He succeeded to the titles of 3rd Baronet Chubb, of Newlands and 3rd Baron Hayter, of Chislehurst in the County of Kent, on the death of his father on 3 March 1967.

He had a wide range of outside interests; from 1965 to 1982 he was chairman of the management committee of the King's Fund, he championed the development of the 'King's Fund bed', an adaptable design which became the standard in British hospitals; he was chairman of the Design Council. the Royal Society of Arts, the Duke of Edinburgh's "Countryside in 1970" committee and the British Security Industry Association. He was also president of the Royal Warrant Holders' Association, the Business Equipment Trade Association and the Canada-UK Chamber of Commerce. He served as upper bailiff of the Worshipful Company of Weavers where he actively supported the admission of women liverymen.

He died on 2 September 2003, aged 92, and was succeeded to the barony by his eldest son, William Chubb.

As of 31 July 2012, the claimed present holder of the barony has not successfully proven his succession to the baronetcy and is therefore not on the Official Roll of the Baronetage. However, the case is under review by the Registrar of the Baronetage.

== Arms ==
Coat of arms of George Chubb, 3rd Baron Hayter
Crest In front of a demi-lion Azure holding between the paws a bezant charged with a rose Gules a key fesswise the ward upwards and to the dexter Or. Escutcheon Quarterly 1st & 4th Azure a cross Erminois between in the first and fourth quarters a bezant and in the second and third a rose Or (Chubb); 2nd & 3rd Azure a chevron between two bulls' heads couped in chief and in base an escallop all Or (Hayter). Supporters On either side a lion Azure holding in the mouth a rose Gules barbed seeded leaved and slipped Proper and charged on the shoulder with a key palewise wards downwards and to the dexter Or. Motto Cavendo Tutus

== Notes ==
Peerage of the United Kingdom
Preceded by Charles Chubb	Baron Hayter; 1967–2003	Succeeded by William Chubb
