= Chub (disambiguation) =

Chub is a common name for fish in several families and genera.

Chub also may refer to:

== Places ==
- Chub, Texas, community in the United States
- Chub Creek, a stream in Minnesota
- Chub Lake (disambiguation)

== Other uses ==
- Squalius cephalus or chub, a species of European freshwater fish
- Chub (container), a type of container
- HMS Chub, several ships
- Chub, chubbing, a legislative discussion among several members to waste time and/or block action; see Filibuster
- Chub (gay slang), large, overweight, or obese man in the gay community
- Chub (haircut), traditional Ukrainian Cossack haircut
- CHUB-FM, a radio station licensed to Red Deer, Alberta, Canada
  - CKWV-FM, a radio station in Nanaimo, British Columbia, Canada, which held the call sign CHUB from 1949 to 1995
- Chub, part of a cheek in British slang

== See also ==
- Chubb (disambiguation)
