= Charles Chubb =

Charles Chubb may refer to:

- Charles Chubb (ornithologist) (1851–1924), British ornithologist
- Charles Chubb (businessman) (1772–1845), British locksmith and businessman, the founder of Chubb Locks
- Charles Chubb, 2nd Baron Hayter (1871–1967), great grandson of Charles Chubb, who founded Chubb and Sons Lock and Safe Co; director and managing director of family firm
- Charles E. Chubb (1845–1930), Australian judge of the Supreme Court of Queensland
