= William Chubb, 4th Baron Hayter =

British businessman (born 1943)

The Right Honourable The Lord Hayter
- Born: 9 October 1943 (age 82); London, England
- Education: Marlborough College
- Alma mater: Nottingham University
- Occupation: Businessman
- Spouse: Waltraud Flackl
- Parent(s): George Chubb, 3rd Baron Hayter (1911–2003); Elizabeth Anne Rumbold (b. 1919)

(George) William Michael Chubb, 4th Baron Hayter (born 9 October 1943), is a British businessman. He is the son of George Chubb, 3rd Baron Hayter (1911–2003), and the great-great-great-grandson of Charles Chubb (1772–1845), who had founded Chubb and Sons Lock and Safe Co.

== Business career ==
Chubb, known as Bill, joined the family business in 1967 as assistant to the managing director of Chubb Australia in Sydney. After six months he returned to the UK and over the next four years he worked in Wolverhampton with various departments including Production Control and Chubb Research before his appointment as managing director of Chubb Malaysia/Singapore in 1972. He returned to Sydney in 1979, this time as managing director of Chubb Australia. In 1983 he moved to the Chubb Group Head Office in Feltham, Middlesex as Director of Business Development, Physical Security, just one year before the acquisition of Chubb by Racal Electronics. He left Racal – Chubb in 1988.

Since 1991 he has held directorships with United Electronic Lock Services Limited.

== Personal life ==
Chubb was educated at Marlborough College, Marlborough, Wiltshire, and Nottingham University, graduating with a BSc. He married Waltraud Flackl, daughter of J. Flackl of Sydney, on 8 January 1983. They have one son. Chubb succeeded to the title of 4th Baron Hayter, of Chislehurst in the County of Kent, on the death of his father on 2 September 2003.

== Notes ==
Peerage of the United Kingdom
Preceded by George Chubb	Baron Hayter; 2003–present	Incumbent; Heir apparent: Hon. Thomas Chubb
