= Cingapura project =

Low-cost housing initiative in São Paulo, Brazil

The Cingapura project is a low-cost housing initiative in São Paulo, Brazil. It is designed to try to move the poor population from favelas (shanty towns), into more permanent structures. This approach mimicked that of the Housing Development Board (HDB) in Singapore (where over 80% of the population lives in HDB-developed public housing), hence the name Cingapura ("Singapore"). These structures are often called 'superblocks'.

They were intended to have a supply of electricity, a good water supply and sewer pipes. On top of this, residential security guards were to be employed to reduce crimes which were and are rife throughout the favelas in Brazil. Much of the work was to be done by the residents of the favelas themselves, the project being dubbed a 'self-help' project. The existing favelas were to be cleared and building materials provided for the builders for free. One of the major difficulties in building on the sites of the favelas was the large slopes on which they are built. This difficult terrain was the only reason the owners of the land did not use it. Levelling the land was expensive and eventually proved too expensive; only a tenth of the proposed apartments were completed, with the focus being on residents living on marginal land, like floodplains. This project is an example of a Top-Down government project which has failed due to its lack of consideration for the locals who would be moved out whilst the project was being constructed.

Some residents are not happy with the way the project has developed. A number of the towers were not completed, leaving a skyline of half-finished buildings and empty shacks. Some residents are frustrated at the way the government have treated them. A number of them have moved away, or committed suicide. Also, some artisans who could practice their craft in a more free environment could not do so, as the buildings were closely controlled by the owners.

Those that were built were not successful, as a number of the families from the favelas found that the new apartments were too much of a change of environment. They did not like the fact they couldn't extend on their new apartments, and some attempted to bring their livestock into the flats. Only 14,000 of the 140,000 projected apartments were actually built. Recently, a reported 6,000 apartments are likely to be built.

== See also ==
- Public housing in Singapore
- Favela
- Urban renewal
- Gentrification
