= Chubb =

Chubb may refer to:

== People ==
- Chubb (surname), a list of people with the surname
- Timothy O'Connor (Irish politician) (1906–1986), Irish politician nicknamed "Chubb"
- Chubb Rock (born 1968), American rapper Richard Simpson

== Companies ==
- Chubb Limited, an American–Swiss insurance company
- Chubb Locks, a British lock and security company
- Chubb Fire & Security, a worldwide operating business specialised in asset protection & life safety

== Other uses ==
- Pingualuit crater, formerly known as Chubb Crater, a meteor crater in Quebec
- Chubb detector lock, a re-locking device which indicates tampering
- Squalius cephalus or chubb, a European river fish
- HMS Chub, several ships

== See also ==
- Chubb illusion, an optical illusion dealing with visual perception
- Chub (disambiguation)
- Chubbtown, Georgia, US
