= George Chubb, 1st Baron Hayter =

British businessman

The Right Honourable The Lord Hayter
- Born: 29 August 1848
- Died: 7 November 1946 (aged 98)
- Occupations: Lock & Safe Manufacturer
- Known for: Chubb Locks & Safes
- Spouse: Sarah Vanner Early, Lady Hayter, DGStJ (died 1940)
- Parent(s): John Chubb and Priscilla Withers
- Relatives: Charles Chubb (1772–1845)

George Hayter Chubb, 1st Baron Hayter (29 August 1848 – 7 November 1946), known as Sir George Chubb, 1st Baronet, from 1900 to 1927, was a British businessman.

Chubb was the son of John Chubb (d. 1872), and the grandson of Charles Chubb (1772–1845), who had founded Chubb and Sons Lock and Safe Co. He was a director of the family firm along with his brothers John and Harry and its Managing Director from 1882 until his death. For a time, he was also chairman of the company.

Chubb was knighted in 1885 and created a Baronet, of Newlands, on 20 June 1900. In 1927 he was further honoured when he was raised to the peerage as Baron Hayter, of Chislehurst in the County of Kent. George Chubb's middle name Hayter (his grandmother's maiden name) was used for the Barony since at the time it was considered unacceptable for company names (albeit a family company) to be used in the House of Lords.

== Personal life ==
In 1870, Chubb married Sarah Vanner Early, only daughter of Charles Early, J.P., of Witney, Oxon. She died in 1940. The couple had three daughters and two sons.

== Death ==
Lord Hayter survived her by six years and died in November 1946, aged 98. He was succeeded in his titles by his elder son, Charles.

== Arms ==
Coat of arms of George Chubb, 1st Baron Hayter
Crest In front of a demi-lion Azure holding between the paws a bezant charged with a rose Gules a key fesswise the ward upwards and to the dexter Or. Escutcheon Quarterly 1st & 4th Azure a cross Erminois between in the first and fourth quarters a bezant and in the second and third a rose Or (Chubb); 2nd & 3rd Azure a chevron between two bulls' heads couped in chief and in base an escallop all Or (Hayter). Supporters On either side a lion Azure holding in the mouth a rose Gules barbed seeded leaved and slipped Proper and charged on the shoulder with a key palewise wards downwards and to the dexter Or. Motto Cavendo Tutus

== Sources ==
- Kidd, Charles, Williamson, David (editors). Debrett's Peerage and Baronetage (1990 edition). New York: St Martin's Press, 1990,
- Leigh Rayment's Peerage Pages

Peerage of the United Kingdom
New creation	Baron Hayter; 1927–1946	Succeeded by Charles Archibald Chubb
Baronetage of the United Kingdom
New creation	Baronet (of Newlands); 1900–1946	Succeeded by Charles Archibald Chubb
