= Elijah Hoole =

English Wesleyan Methodist missionary (1798–1872)

Elijah Hoole (1798–1872) was an English orientalist and Wesleyan Methodist missionary.

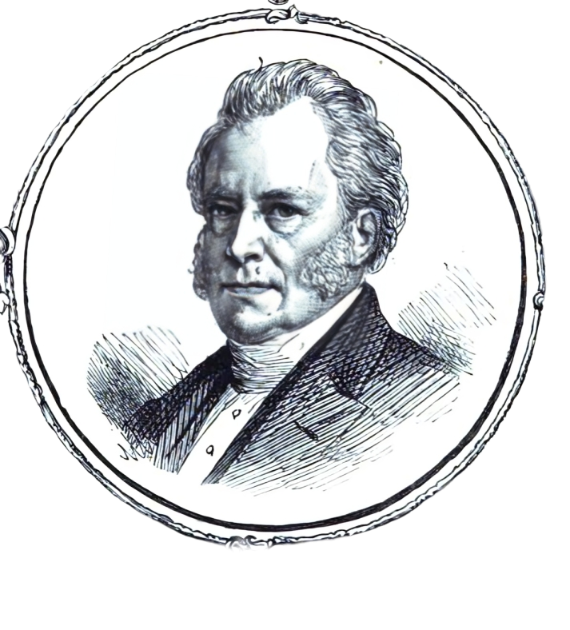

== Life ==
The son of Holland Hoole, a Manchester shoemaker, he was born there; he entered Manchester grammar school 6 April 1809, leaving in 1813 to help in his father's business. After studying privately, he became a probationer for the Wesleyan ministry in 1818, and was chosen a missionary by the Wesleyan Methodist missionary committee in November 1819.

Hoole arrived in Madras (now Chennai) in September 1820, having lost his library and outfit by shipwreck on the way. After short stays there and at Negapatam, he settled at Bangalore in April 1821. He was recalled to Madras in March 1822, and was elected a member of the committee for revising the Tamil version of the Bible.

In 1828 Hoole was forced by ill-health to leave India, and shortly after his return to Europe was appointed a superintendent of schools in Ireland. He moved to London in 1834, and became assistant-secretary, and from 1836 till his death one of the general secretaries of the Wesleyan Missionary Society. Hoole died on 17 June 1872 and is buried in a family grave in the dissenters section of the west side of Highgate Cemetery, in front of the grave of Charles Chubb, the lock and safe manufacturer.

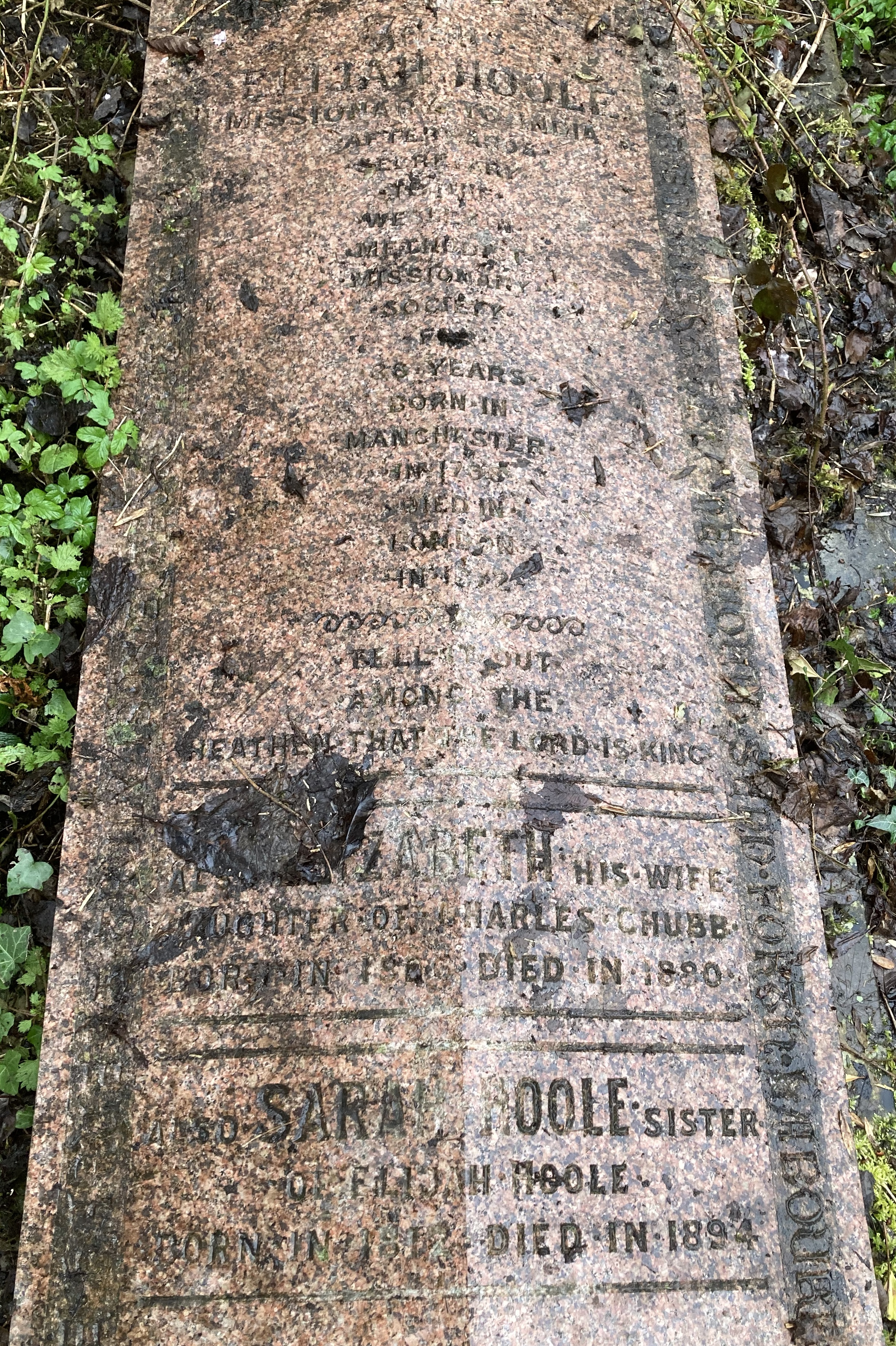
Family grave of Elijah Hoole in Highgate Cemetery

== Works ==
During his stay in Southern India, Hoole published a number of translations into Tamil, including portions of the Bible, a book of hymns (Madras, 1825), tracts on Methodism, and a life of John Wesley. He wrote:

- A Personal Narrative of a Mission to the South of India from 1820–8, London, 1829, an account of his experiences; an enlarged edition, with the title Madras, Mysore, and the South of India appeared in London in 1844.
- The Year-book of Missions, 1847.
- Oglethorpe and the Wesleys.

Hoole also contributed articles to the Journal of the Royal Asiatic Society and London Quarterly Review, and edited two books on missions by Walter Lawry, 1850 and 1851.

== Family ==
Hoole married in 1835 Elizabeth, third daughter of Charles Chubb. His son Elijah (1837-1912) was an architect of Methodist churches and social housing.

== Notes ==
Attribution

This article incorporates text from a publication now in the public domain: Lee, Sidney, ed. (1891). "Hoole, Elijah". Dictionary of National Biography. Vol. 27. London: Smith, Elder & Co.
