= Cecil Chubb =

Last private owner of the prehistoric monument Stonehenge (1876–1934)

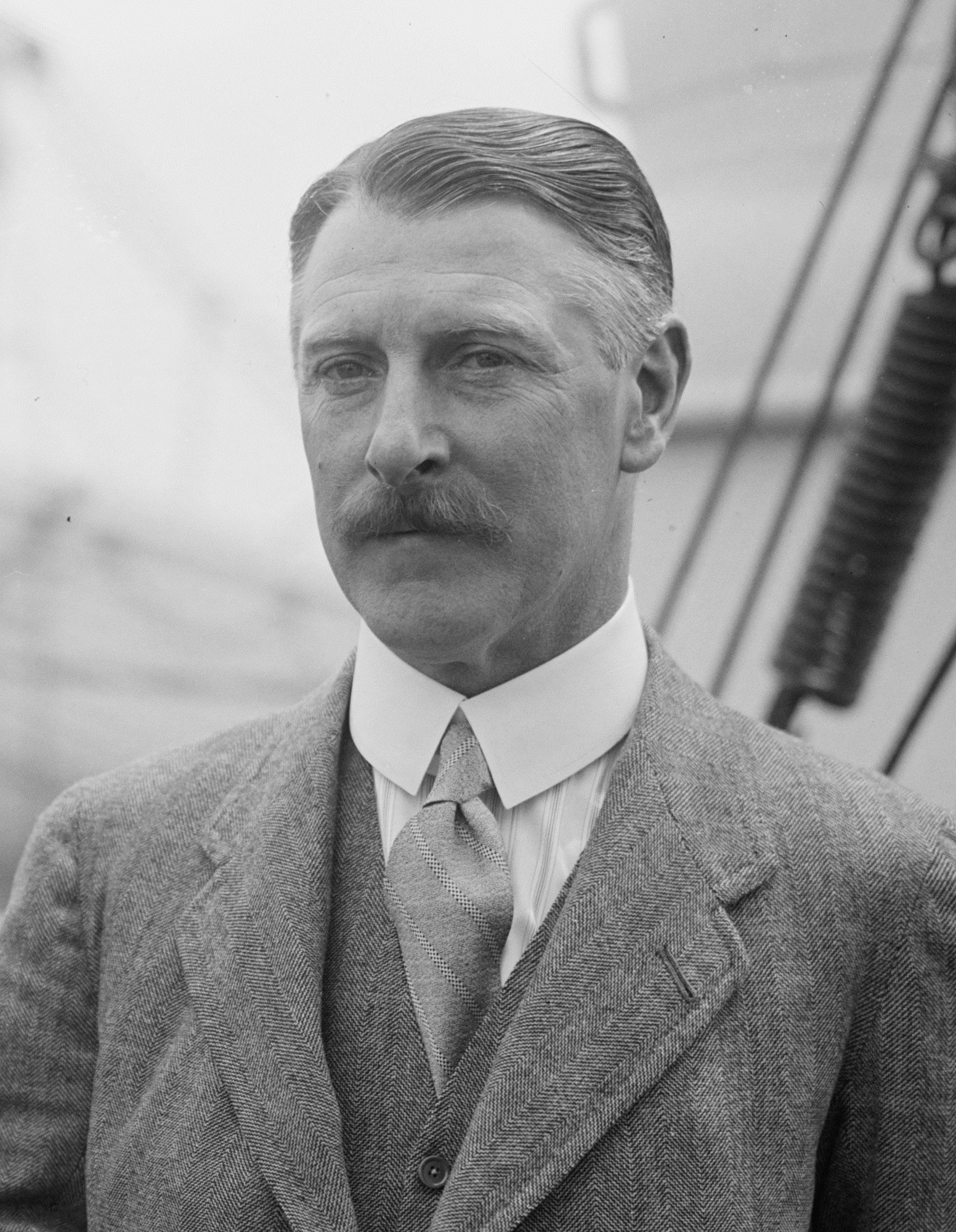
Sir Cecil Chubb in May 1926 on board RMS Aquitania

Sir Cecil Herbert Edward Chubb, 1st Baronet (14 April 1876 – 22 September 1934), was the last private owner of Stonehenge prehistoric monument, Wiltshire, which he donated to the British government in 1918.

== Early life and education ==
Chubb was born in Shrewton, a village 4 miles (6.4 km) west of Stonehenge, the eldest son of Alfred and Mary Chubb. His father, "Fred", was the village saddler and harness maker, as was his father before him. Cecil attended the local village school and then the Bishop Wordsworth's School in Salisbury, where from the age of 14 he worked for a time as a student teacher.

Chubb met his future wife at a cricket game between his Bishop Wordsworth School and Fisherton House Asylum. He then attended Christ's College, Cambridge where he was awarded a double first in Science and Law, leaving with Master of Arts and Bachelor of Law degrees.

== Career ==
Chubb became a barrister and amassed a considerable fortune.

In 1902 he married Mary Bella Alice Finch, whose uncle, Dr W. Corbin Finch, owned Fisherton House, which was a mental asylum (later the Old Manor Hospital, now Fountain Way). Five years after her uncle's death in 1905, the business and buildings were transferred to her. Following financial difficulties, a limited company was formed to run the hospital in 1924, and Sir Cecil became chairman. While he was in charge, the hospital became the largest private mental hospital in Europe. There is a plaque in the hospital commemorating his life and work.

Sir Cecil also served on Salisbury City Council, was a Justice of the Peace and became a successful racehorse owner and breeder of Shorthorn cattle.

== Purchase of Stonehenge ==
Stonehenge was one of several lots put up for auction in 1915 by Sir Cosmo Gordon Antrobus, soon after he had inherited the estate from his brother. Cecil Chubb's interest in the local area led to his attending the sale, with him bidding and purchasing Lot 15 on a whim for £6,600 (about £587,000/€692,000/$767,000 today), as he wished to avoid the stones being acquired by someone overseas.

He gave Stonehenge to the nation on 26 October 1918. The deed of gift included the following conditions:

First that the public shall have free access to the premises hereby conveyed and every part thereof on the payment of such reasonable sum per head not exceeding one shilling for each visit and subject to such conditions as the Commissioners of Works in the exercise and execution of their statutory powers and duties may from time to time impose Secondly that the premises shall so far as possible be maintained in their present condition Thirdly that no building or erection other than a pay box similar to the Pay Box now standing on the premises shall be erected on any part of the premises within four hundred yards of The Milestone marked "Amesbury 2" on the northern frontage of the premises and Fourthly that the Commissioners of Works will at all times save harmless and keep indemnified the Donors and each of them their and each of their estates and effects from and against all proceedings costs claims and expenses on account of any breach or non-observance of the covenants by the Donors to the like or similar effect contained in the Conveyance of the premises to the Donors.

Local residents are still entitled to free admission to Stonehenge because of a different agreement concerning the moving of a right of way.

To mark his generosity he was made a baronet in 1919 by Lloyd George. Chubb's arms feature a trilithon representing Stonehenge.

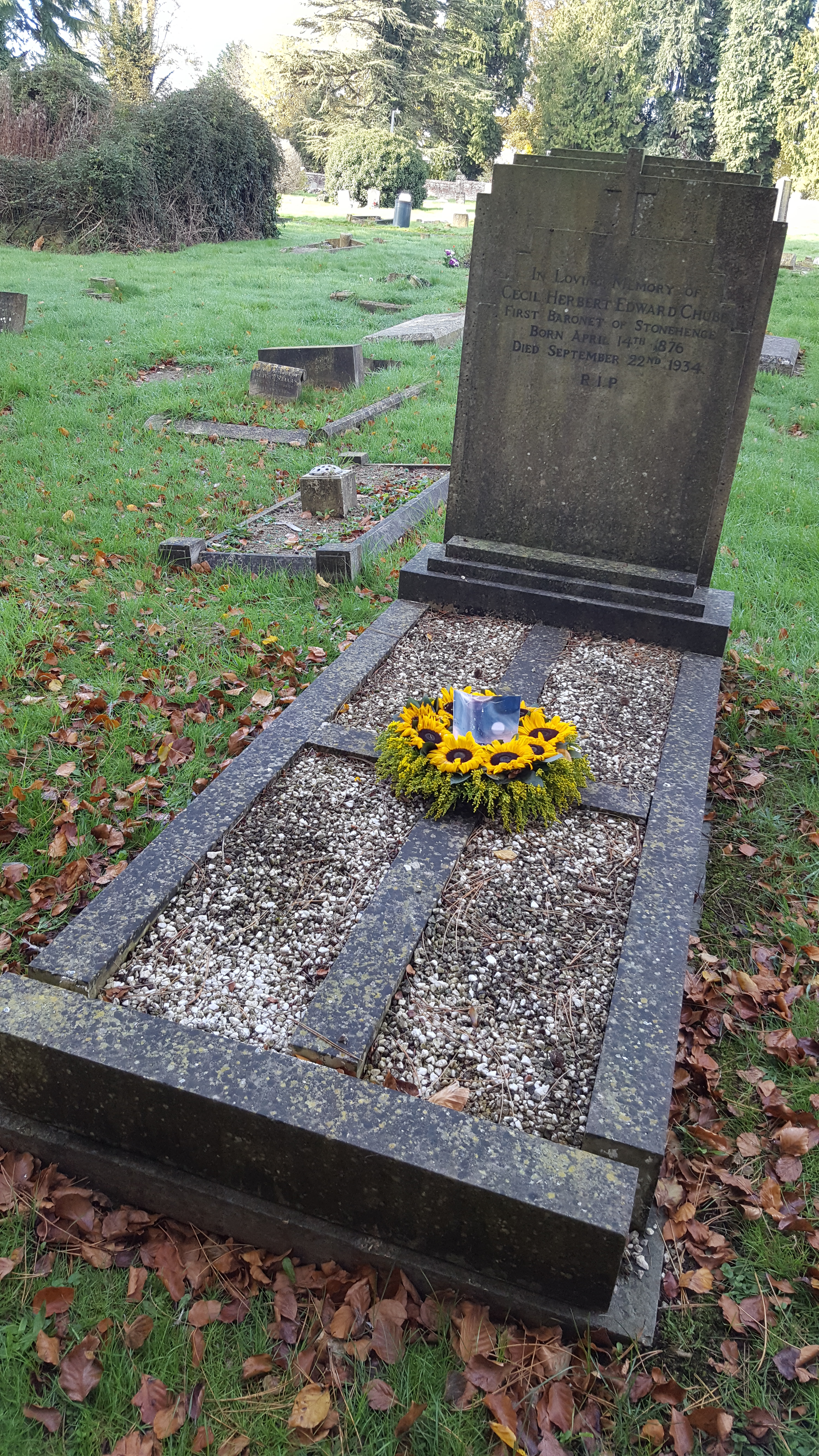
Sir Cecil Chubb's grave in the Devizes Road cemetery in Salisbury, Wiltshire, showing the wreath laid to mark the centenary of his donation of Stonehenge to the nation near the end of the First World War

== Death and legacy ==
Chubb died of heart disease at his house (from 1930) in Bournemouth, Rothwell Dene, on 22 September 1934 aged 58, leaving behind his wife, son John, who succeeded him, and daughter Mary.

A plaque commemorating his birth was erected in the late 1980s on the house in Shrewton where he was born. It was unveiled by his two surviving nephews.

Baronetage of the United Kingdom
New title	Baronet (of Stonehenge); 1919–1934	Succeeded by John Corbin Chubb
