= Worshipful Company of Weavers =

Livery company of the City of London

- Motto: Weave Truth With Trust
- Location: Saddlers House; Gutter Lane, London
- Date of formation: 1130, perhaps formed earlier
- Company association: Textile industries
- Order of precedence: 42nd
- Master of company: Andrew Winterton
- Website: www.weavers.org.uk

The Worshipful Company of Weavers is the most ancient of the Livery Companies in the City of London. It existed in the year 1130, and was perhaps formed earlier. The company received a Royal Charter in 1155. At present, the Company retains a connection to textiles through its contributions to the textile industry. Like most other Livery Companies, it has also evolved into a charitable institution rather than remaining a trade association.

The Company ranks forty-second in the order of precedence of the Livery Companies. Its motto is Weave Truth With Trust.

Members of the Livery elect annually an Upper Bailiff who bears an ancient title unique to the Weavers' Company, and a Renter Bailiff. Previous Upper Bailiffs have included:

- George Kemp, 1st Baron Rochdale 1926–1927 and 1939–1940
- George Hayter Chubb, 1st Baron Hayter 1931–32
- Sir Henry Birchenough 1934–35
- John Garbutt
