= Charles Chubb, 2nd Baron Hayter =

British businessman (1871 – 1967)

The Right Honourable The Lord Hayter
- Born: 11 November 1871; Chislehurst, Kent, England
- Died: 3 March 1967 (aged 95)
- Occupation: Businessman
- Spouse(s): 1) Mary Haworth (d. 1948); 2) (Margaret) Alison Pickard (d. 1986)
- Parent(s): George Chubb, 1st Baron Hayter (1848–1946); Sarah Vanner Early (1849–1940)

Charles Archibald Chubb, 2nd Baron Hayter (11 November 1871 – 3 March 1967), was a British businessman.

Chubb was the son of George Chubb, 1st Baron Hayter (1848–1946), and the great-grandson of Charles Chubb (1772–1845), who had founded Chubb and Sons Lock and Safe Co.

== Business career ==
He was a director of the family firm and its managing director from 1898 until 1948, his cousin Harry Emory Chubb became the chairman soon after. He was president of the Planet Building Society (later Magnet & Planet B.S.) and was a senior member of the Court of Common Council, City of London.

== Personal life ==
Chubb was educated at The Leys School, Cambridge. He married Mary Haworth, daughter of John Fletcher Haworth JP, on 8 June 1898. They had three children, Shirley Chubb (1909–2002), George Charles Hayter Chubb (25 April 1911 – 2 September 2003), and Hon. David William Early Chubb (31 May 1914 – 4 March 1993). She died 4 June 1948. He succeeded to the titles in the baronetcy and the barony on the death of his father on 7 November 1946. He then married (Margaret) Alison, daughter of John Gimson Pickard, on 23 March 1949. He died on 3 March 1967, aged 95, and was succeeded in his titles by his son George Charles Hayter Chubb.

== Arms ==
Coat of arms of Charles Chubb, 2nd Baron Hayter
Crest In front of a demi-lion Azure holding between the paws a bezant charged with a rose Gules a key fesswise the ward upwards and to the dexter Or. Escutcheon Quarterly 1st & 4th Azure a cross Erminois between in the first and fourth quarters a bezant and in the second and third a rose Or (Chubb); 2nd & 3rd Azure a chevron between two bulls' heads couped in chief and in base an escallop all Or (Hayter). Supporters On either side a lion Azure holding in the mouth a rose Gules barbed seeded leaved and slipped Proper and charged on the shoulder with a key palewise wards downwards and to the dexter Or. Motto Cavendo Tutus

== Notes ==
Peerage of the United Kingdom
Preceded by George Hayter Chubb	Baron Hayter; 1946–1967	Succeeded by George Charles Hayter Chubb
