= Marie Van Brittan Brown and Albert L. Brown =

American nurse and electronics engineer

Marie Van Brittan Brown
- Born: October 30, 1922; Manhattan, New York
- Died: February 2, 1999 (aged 76); Jamaica, Queens, New York
- Known for: Patenting a home video security system.
- Spouse: Albert L. Brown
- Children: Norma and Albert Jr.

Albert L. Brown
- Known for: Patenting a home video security system.
- Spouse: Marie Van Brittan
- Children: Norma and Albert Jr.

Marie Van Brittan Brown (October 30, 1922 – February 2, 1999) was an American nurse and inventor best known for co-creating one of the earliest integrated home security systems. Brown lived most of her life in the Jamaica, Queens area of New York City, a community that experienced significant increases in crime during the 1960s. Her profession required her to work long and irregular hours, including nights and weekends. Her husband Albert L. Brown, was an electronics technician and he had inconsistent work schedules. In 1966 they invented an audio-visual home security system which combined several existing technologies including a camera and monitor, two-way communication and a remote-controlled door lock. That same year they applied for a patent for their security system. It was granted three years later in 1969.

== Family ==
Marie Van Brittan Felton was born in Manhattan, New York. Her father, Theodore Felton, was born in North Carolina and her mother, Lillian Robinson was from Pennsylvania. Both were African-American.

Marie married Albert L. Brown, also African-American, in 1949. The couple lived at 151–158 and 135th Avenue in Jamaica, Queens, New York. Marie and Albert had two children. Their daughter also became a nurse and inventor.

Marie died in Queens on February 2, 1999, aged seventy-six.

== Home security system ==
=== Development of the Home Security System ===
During the 1960s, Brown became increasingly concerned about her safety in her neighborhood. Crime rates in parts of New York City were rising during this period, and emergency response times were often slow. Because Brown frequently returned home late from work and sometimes stayed home alone with her children, she began to worry about how she would respond if someone approached her door unexpectedly. These concerns were heightened by the fact that she had limited ways to identify visitors safely. Her personal experiences and concerns about her family safety motivated her to explore technological solutions that would allow her to monitor visitors and control access to her home without putting herself at risk.

In 1966, Brown and her husband began working together to develop a home security system. Their invention used closed-circuit television technology, which at the time was still relatively uncommon in residential settings. The system was designed to allow homeowners to see who was at their door and communicate with visitors without opening the door, reducing the risk of potential danger.

=== Patent ===
On August 1, 1966, the Browns submitted a patent application for their invention. Their attorneys were Polacheck and Saulsbury, a New York firm.

The invention consisted, at the door, of an electrically controlled lock, several lensed peepholes with covers, a vertically sliding video scanner (camera) and controlling motors, loudspeaker and microphone as well as associated electronics, filters, power supply, radio receiver and transmitter. The camera could be remotely moved from peephole to peephole, mechanically uncovering and recovering them as it went. The camera was connected by radio to a television monitor mounted on a control panel inside the home. The television monitor allowed the occupant to see who was at the door without opening it while the microphones and loudspeakers allowed the occupant to communicate radiophonically with the visitor. A series of filters on the door receiver allowed commands from push buttons on the control panel to be transmitted by radio to control the position of the camera and operate the lock.

The patent also mentions the possibility of forwarding sound or vision to a security center, or recording them. A pushbutton alarm system to contact police or others is also included. The patent cited other inventors, including Edward D. Phinney and Thomas J. Reardon, as well as RCA's Closed Circuit Television Systems, Book I, pp. 182–186, 1958.

The patent was granted December 2, 1969. Four days later, the New York Times reported on the invention in the weekly patents report, including a photo of the Browns. Marie was quoted in the New York Times as saying that with her invention "a woman alone could set off an alarm immediately by pressing a button, or if the system were installed in a doctor's office, it might prevent holdups by drug addicts".

After the patent was approved in 1969, media coverage ceased until much later.

=== State of technology at the time ===
The majority of the components of the system were well known. For example US3,480,727, approved a month or so before the Brown patent, describes a wired system with audio, video and lock control, the novel feature being, in this case, the ability to pass all the signals on a single wire. Similarly Harris Hull's patent (US3,440,635) is for a radio press-button alarm which sends a coded signal to alert nearby receivers. AT&T had promoted experimental video for telephony at the 1939 World's Fair, in the mid 1960s public videophone booths were set up in Grand Central Station. Domestic entryway CCTV was limited by price, costing around $1,000 for a system, making it unsuitable for most single dwellings, although many new apartments had such a system, where the cost per unit was less (as they shared the entryway equipment) and was offset by the increased value of the apartments, and hence increased rent, and, in some cases, savings on door staff.

=== Claim of the patent ===
The novelty of the patent lies in the combination of the components into a system, and that is what is claimed. Specifically:

1. A security system for protecting the interior of a place of residence having an entrance door, comprising a plurality of windows in the door disposed in vertically spaced array; protective plates covering the windows, respectively; means pivotally supporting said plates on the door to clear each of the windows; a cabinet containing a video scanning device; gear means movably supporting the cabinet to move in a vertical path at the door; motor means in the cabinet engaged with said gear means to drive the video scanning device in said vertical path past the windows while the cabinet pivots each protective plate in turn to clear its associated window for exposing said video scanning device at the cleared window; a video signal transmitter in said cabinet connected to said video scanning device to send a picture of a scanned field in front of each cleared window in turn to a remote location in the interior of said place of residence; radio receiver means in said cabinet; radio transmitter means at said remote location for sending radio signals to said radio receiver; power supply means connected to said motor means for energizing the same to drive the video scanning device up and down; and switch means connected in circuit with said power supply and said radio receiver means for turning on the motor means selectively in response to receipt of a signal from said radio transmitter means, whereby the field in front of each cleared window is scanned in turn.

=== Response ===
While they hoped to interest manufacturers and home builders, they did not succeed. The cost of the equipment at that time would have been very high. At the time, the equipment required to produce the system, including cameras, monitors, and electronic components, was expensive and not commonly available for residential use. Additionally, many homeowners were unfamiliar with surveillance technology, which limited consumer interest.

=== Legacy ===
The Brown's patent has been cited in 38 patent applications, as of July 2024. Their invention has been widely cited as an inspirational story. The Brown's patent received 38 patent application citations until July 2024. The security technology field and society continue to benefit from her groundbreaking invention which has become a motivational example for many people. Through her home security system invention Marie Van Brittan Brown created the foundation for a security industry that would expand into a multi-billion-dollar market, which transformed residential and commercial security practices. The security industry now operates as a multi-billion-dollar market because of Brown's home security system invention, which revolutionized how people protect their properties. The security system developed by Brown introduced essential security concepts that security technology continues to use today. The video surveillance system with distant communication that Brown developed in 1966 serves as the base for all modern smart home systems. The security system design elements she created for video doorbells and smart locks, and home automation systems now protect millions of households worldwide. Brown achieved her technical objective, yet her success led to social effects that surpassed her initial intentions. Brown encountered extreme difficulties in the security technology field of the 1960s because she was an African American woman working among white male professionals. The world recognizes her as a leading figure who broke down barriers for underrepresented groups in STEM fields and innovation through her patent achievements and recognition. Educational programs and STEM initiatives use Brown's achievements to motivate girls and minority students toward technology and engineering career paths. She created the security system because her Queens neighborhood required protection from crime, since police took too long to respond. The innovation solved actual community requirements through the combination of different viewpoints, which produced better technological outcomes. The security industry started focusing on residential systems after Brown's invention by more than twenty years before the market began to show interest in this area. The patent documentation reveals its influence on future security patent development through its documented citation history. The security systems we use today, including video intercoms and advanced surveillance systems, derive their concepts from Brown's first design. The system components, which included a camera and monitor, and two-way microphone, and remote door controls, became the foundation that manufacturers used to create new security products throughout multiple decades. The world has started to understand Brown's achievements at a higher level since the beginning of this decade. Security technology experts now recognize Brown as a key figure who helped create the security technology industry.

The Smithsonian Institution, along with other museums, has displayed her work in exhibits that honor African American inventors and women in technology. Digital archives, together with educational resources, now present Brown's story alongside other groundbreaking inventors to teach future generations about her achievements. The security system she created continues to influence modern discussions about surveillance and privacy and their relationship with technology in society. Through her invention, she created a security system that allowed people to defend themselves, while today we face similar challenges about security versus privacy in our monitored society. The commercial security industry has accepted Brown's fundamental security system concepts by using them to develop their products. The security industry started using consumer products instead of commercial and industrial systems because Brown worked to develop security systems that were easy to use and accessible to everyone. The security technology revolution brought protective systems to ordinary homeowners, which transformed their expectations about safeguarding their properties and personal safety.
