= Chub Lake =

Chub Lake may refer to:

- Chub Lake (Dakota County), Minnesota
- Chub Lake (Carlton County), Minnesota
- Chub Lake (New York), in Hamilton County

== See also ==
- Lake chub
