= Home security =

Set of practices to protect homes against crime

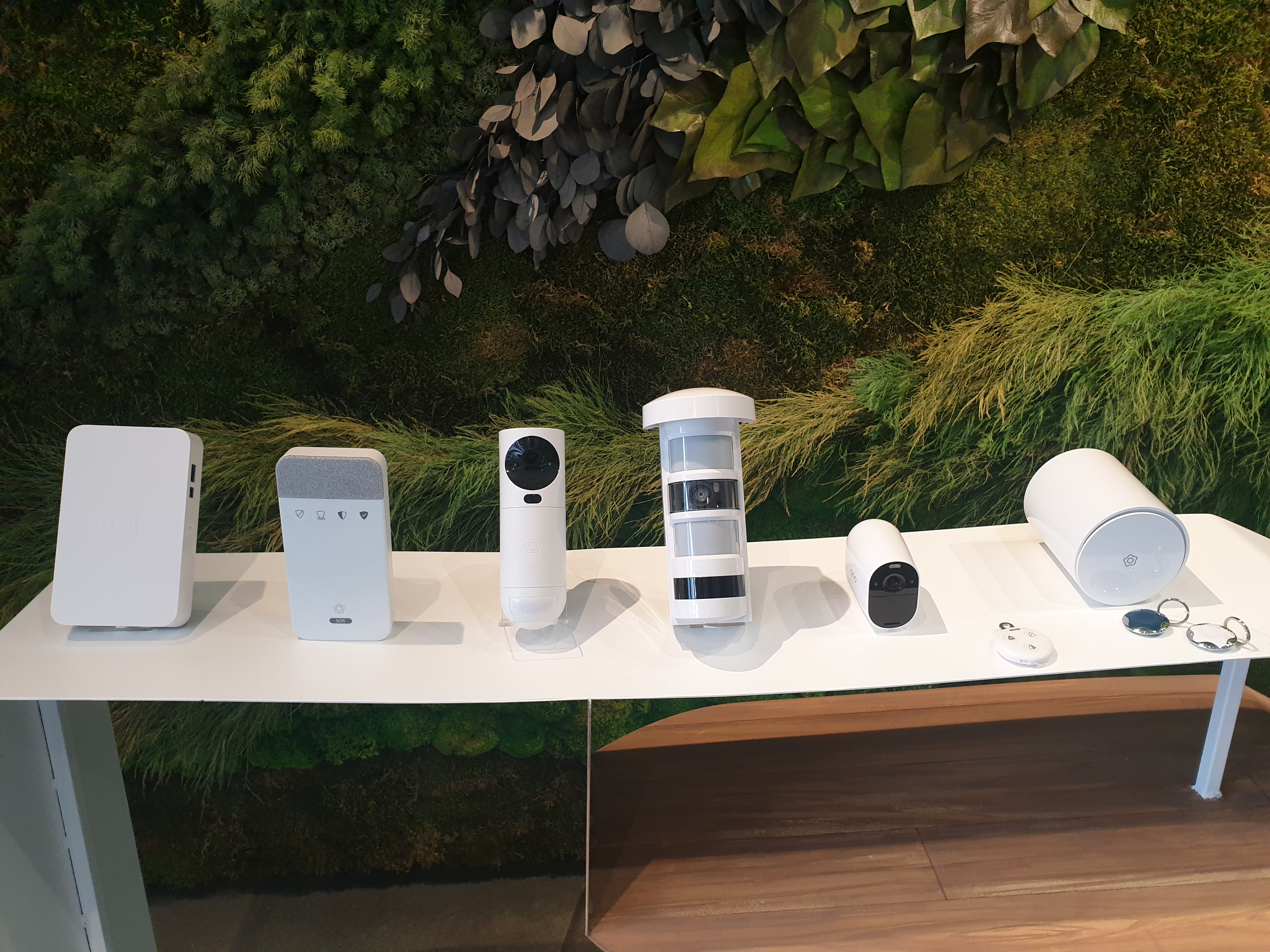
Components of a modern wireless home security system

Home security includes both the security hardware placed on a property and individuals' personal security practices. Security hardware includes doors, locks, alarm systems, lighting, motion detectors, and security camera systems. Personal security involves practices such as ensuring doors are locked, alarms are activated, owning a dog, and keeping windows closed , and extra keys are not hidden outside.

According to an FBI report, 58.3% of burglaries in the United States involved forcible entry. Per the most recent statistics, the average burglary in the United States takes about 90 seconds to 12 minutes, and on average, a burglar will break into a home within 60 seconds. Most target cash first followed by jewels, drugs, and electronics. Common security methods include never hiding extra keys outside, never turning off all the lights, applying small CCTV stickers on doors, and keeping good tabs with neighbours.

== Origin ==
Electric burglar alarms and alarm networks with central monitoring stations existed in the US since the late 19th century. Edwin Holmes is credited with commercializing the electromagnetic burglar alarm and with establishing the first burglar alarm networks. Closed-circuit television for home security (with cameras and monitors) was first introduced in the US in the early 1950s.

In 1966 Marie Van Brittan Brown and her husband Albert Brown invented a home security system which combined several existing technologies into an integrated system, including a camera and monitor, two-way communication and a remote-controlled door lock. They were granted a patent in 1969 (U.S. patent 3,482,037).

== Security hardware ==
=== Control panels ===
One main component to home security is finding an area for easy programming and user interaction. A control panel is implemented to arm and disarm a home security system. The control panel is the main connection to the alarm company monitoring a home. It typically features a touchpad or buttons to easily maneuver the system, and some newer systems also feature voice control or wireless remotes (key fobs).

=== Door and window sensors ===
Door and window sensors are also implemented in most home security systems. One part of the system is installed on the door or window itself while the other part is installed on the frame of the door or window. The two part system connects securely when a door or window is closed, creating a security circuit.

Window sensors use a range of technologies like magnetic switches, beam sensors, motion sensors, or a glass break sensor.

=== Door Locks ===
Within the United Kingdom it is standard practice to have a 5-lever British standard mortise lock fitted to a wooden door, this will ensure that the property is compliant within the insurance sector. A cylinder that is anti-snap fitted to a uPVC door will prevent lock snapping.

=== Presence simulation ===
Smart homes have started to become more advanced. New devices are emerging with the specific purpose of simulating presence. They do this through movement simulation by using light-and shadow-effects at night or sound simulation at daytime.

=== Surveillance cameras ===
Surveillance cameras used in houses are IP cameras or closed circuit. IP cameras connect over the internet and stream to users’ phones using a Wi-Fi connection. Closed-circuit, or CCTV cameras, stream through wired or wireless links. These cameras stream live footage to users, allowing them to watch for suspicious activity.

Current cameras feature abilities such as motion detection and two-way audio, allowing users to receive notifications of activity and speak and listen through the camera. Home surveillance cameras used for security purposes have become more accessible, but have sparked security concerns from consumers.

=== Motion sensors ===
Surveillance cameras and motion sensors work hand in hand with allowing home owners to keep an eye on areas of their home that they might not have access to at the moment. Motion sensors create zones which cannot be accessed without sounding an alarm. Most cameras do now have a motion detection function, with some brands having thermal detection so they only activate when sensing a heat signature. This function is used so cameras do not pick up false alarms from trees blowing in the wind.

=== Glass break detector ===
Glass break detectors are usually installed near glass doors or a window front of a store. This equipment uses a microphone to detect when a pane of glass is broken or shattered. By monitoring the sound and vibrations the alarm only reacts to sounds above a certain threshold to avoid false alarms.

=== High-decibel alarms ===
High-decibel alarms ensure that a break in will not go unnoticed. These alarm systems are loud enough so that neighbors will hear them. They are also implemented with the intention to frighten an unwanted intruder.

All of the technology based security hardware works hand in hand with the control panels in a house to relay messages to the monitoring company. Home owners rely heavily on these systems to ensure their safety, and without the control panel monitoring everything happening within the home, this is impossible.

=== Main computer panel ===
This is usually in a closet or utility room somewhere on the premises. It is used in older or larger systems to link the components. Usually, you would find a PCB with many terminals or antenna for connections. Many also have built-in backup batteries for wired systems and a phone or Ethernet line in or out port. Some might have a serial port for connection to a technician's computer for diagnostics. These are the true heart of the system. Most control (user interface) panels connect directly to this panel in older or larger wired systems. In some cases, the user interface does connect directly to the components or service, but in most cases, it is relayed through a hub or main panel.

== Industry ==
Some forecasts project the home security market as a whole will be worth $47 billion by 2020, with the DIY home security market worth $1.5 billion. While the market for home security is expanding, especially with cable TV and Internet service providers introducing their own security and home automation products, it is a fragmented market, with "a massive array of large and small rivals." The US market leader is ADT with more than 6 million households subscribed.

The FBI reported that 1.7 million homes were burglarized in 2014. The same report shows that an estimated loss of $3.9 billion was suffered by the victims in the same year. Overall, when the average value was applied to the estimated number of burglaries, the average dollar loss per burglary offense was $2,251. Roughly, there are 2.5 million burglaries a year with 66% being home break-ins. Police typically only solve 13% of break-in crimes due to lack of information and witnesses.

== Statistics ==
It is reported that 53% of break-ins occur during the day and 47% occur at night. Break-ins are 6% more likely to occur between 6am and 6pm while most are out of the house.

With only 17% of homes being equipped with home security systems, many burglars are attracted to homes lacking a system. 95% of break-ins require some type of forceful entry (breaking a window, lock picking, kicking in doors). Some common tools used for break-ins are pliers, screwdrivers, and hammers. This makes it hard to see break-ins coming since they are common household tools.

A study at UNC Charlotte concluded that burglars are commonly males under the age of 25. 12% of burglars admitted to planning their break-in in advance while 41% said it was an impulsive decision. Also, many burglars admitted they consider factors like proximity to traffic. 83% of burglars said they look for evidence of an alarm system, and 60% said they do not break in if they see one is installed.

== See also ==
- Burglary
- Physical security
- Property crime
- Self-defense
