= Richard Finch (rugby union) =

England international rugby union player

- Full name: Richard Tanner Finch
- Born: 9 June 1857 Kensington, Middlesex, England
- Died: 12 January 1921 (aged 63) Seaton, Devon, England

Rugby union career
- Position: Halfback
International career
Years	Team	Apps	(Points)
1880	England	1	(0)

Richard Tanner Finch (9 June 1857 – 12 January 1921) was an English international rugby union player.

Finch was educated at Sherborne School and Pembroke College, Cambridge.

A diminutive halfback, Finch gained four rugby blues with Cambridge University RFC. He captained them in the 1879–80 Varsity Match and kicked the winning drop goal. In 1880, Finch was capped for England in their Calcutta Cup win over Scotland at Manchester.

Fnich was a long time medical superintendent of Fisherton House Asylum in Salisbury.

== See also ==
- List of England national rugby union players
