= Chubb baronets =

Baronetcy in the Baronetage of the United Kingdom

There have been two baronetcies created for persons with the surname Chubb, both in the Baronetage of the United Kingdom.

The Chubb Baronetcy, of Newlands, in the parish of Chislehurst in the County of Kent, was created in the Baronetage of the United Kingdom on 20 June 1900. For more information on this creation, see the Baron Hayter.

The Chubb Baronetcy, of Stonehenge in the County of Wiltshire, was created in the Baronetage of the United Kingdom on 17 September 1919 for Cecil Chubb, the last private owner of Stonehenge. The title became extinct on the death of the second Baronet in 1957.

== Chubb baronets, of Newlands (1900) ==
- see the Baron Hayter

== Chubb baronets, of Stonehenge (1919) ==
- Sir Cecil Herbert Edward Chubb, 1st Baronet (1876–1934)
- Sir John Corbin Chubb, 2nd Baronet (1904–1957)
