= John Chubb (locksmith) =

English locksmith and inventor (1816–1872)

- Born: John Chubb; 10 December 1816; Portsea, Portsmouth, Hampshire, England
- Died: 30 October 1872 (aged 55); Brixton Rise, Surrey, England
- Occupations: Locksmith, Lock & Safe Manufacturer
- Known for: Chubb Locks & Safes
- Spouses: Pricilla Withers; Eliza Bealey Bunting
- Parent(s): Charles Chubb & Maria Heyter

John Chubb (10 December 1816 – 30 October 1872), was an English locksmith and inventor who patented many improvements to locks, safes and strong rooms.

He succeeded his father Charles Chubb, who had founded the family company of Chubb & Son.

He wrote an important paper on locks and keys, for which he was awarded the Telford Medal in 1850 by the Institution of Civil Engineers.

He married twice. His three sons John, George and Henry succeeded him in running the business, of whom George became Baron Hayter of Chislehurst in 1928.
