= Baron Hayter =

Barony in the Peerage of the United Kingdom

Baron Hayter, of Chislehurst in the County of Kent, is a title in the Peerage of the United Kingdom. It was created in 1927 for the businessman Sir George Chubb, 1st Baronet. He had already been created a baronet of Newlands in the Baronetage of the United Kingdom in 1900. Chubb was chairman and managing director of the firm Chubb and Sons Lock and Safe Co Ltd, established by his grandfather Charles Chubb in the early 19th century. "Hayter" was the maiden name of George Hayter Chubb's mother, and was selected in preference to "Chubb", as it was not considered appropriate for names of corporations to be attributed to members of the House of Lords. He was succeeded by his son, the second baron. He was managing director of Chubb and Sons Lock and Safe Co Ltd. His son, the third baron, was managing director and chairman of Chubb and Sons Lock and Safe Co Ltd and also served as deputy chairman of the House of Lords from 1981 to 1995.

As of 2026 the titles are held by the latter's son, the 4th Baron, who succeeded in 2003.

== Chubb Baronets, of Newlands (1900) ==
- Sir George Hayter Chubb, 1st Baronet (1848–1946) (created Baron Hayter in 1927)

== Barons Hayter (1927) ==
- George Hayter Chubb, 1st Baron Hayter (1848–1946)
- Charles Archibald Chubb, 2nd Baron Hayter (1871–1967)
- George Charles Hayter Chubb, 3rd Baron Hayter (1911–2003)
- (George) William Michael Chubb, 4th Baron Hayter (born 1943)

The heir apparent is the present holder's only son, Hon. Thomas Frederick Flackl Chubb (born 1986).

== Arms ==
Coat of arms of Baron Hayter
Crest In front of a demi-lion Azure holding between the paws a bezant charged with a rose Gules a key fesswise the ward upwards and to the dexter Or. Escutcheon Quarterly 1st & 4th Azure a cross Erminois between in the first and fourth quarters a bezant and in the second and third a rose Or (Chubb); 2nd & 3rd Azure a chevron between two bulls' heads couped in chief and in base an escallop all Or (Hayter). Supporters On either side a lion Azure holding in the mouth a rose Gules barbed seeded leaved and slipped Proper and charged on the shoulder with a key palewise wards downwards and to the dexter Or. Motto Cavendo Tutus

== Notes ==
Baronetage of the United Kingdom
Preceded by Chance baronets	Chubb baronets of Newlands; 20 June 1900	Succeeded by Greene baronets
