= Fountain Way =

- Avon and Wiltshire Mental Health Partnership NHS Trust
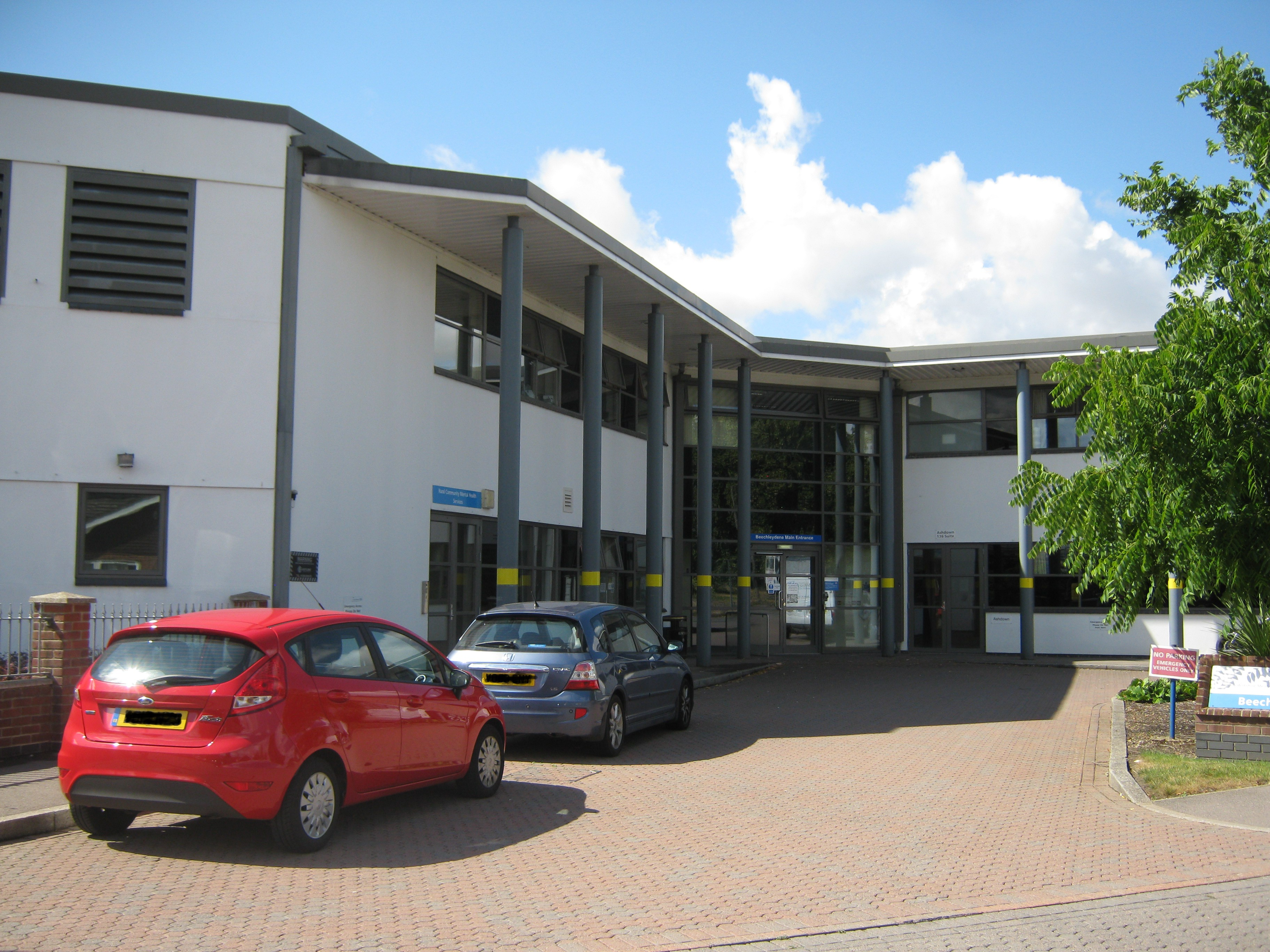
- The entrance to Beechlydene Ward

- Location in Wiltshire

Geography
- Location: Wilton Road, Salisbury, Wiltshire, England, United Kingdom
- Coordinates: 51.072°N 1.810°W

Organisation
- Care system: Public NHS

Services
- Emergency department: No Accident & Emergency

History
- Founded: 2003

Links
- Website: www.awp.nhs.uk
- Lists: Hospitals in England

Fountain Way is a mental health facility in Salisbury, Wiltshire, England. It is managed by the Avon and Wiltshire Mental Health Partnership NHS Trust which is based in Chippenham, Wiltshire.

== History ==
The hospital, which replaced the Old Manor Hospital, opened on the southern part of the site of the facility which it replaced in 2003. The name derives from the Grade II listed fountain that stands in the entrance of the old hospital site.

== Services ==
The hospital wards are as follows:

- Administration offices for the Assertive Outreach Team
- Ashdown Ward – a secure psychiatric intensive care unit
- Amblescroft North – a secure assessment ward for elderly people with mental health problems
- Amblescroft South – a secure ward for elderly people with continuing mental health problems
- Beechlydene Ward – a psychiatric inpatient ward for adults
- Foxley Green – administration offices; used for the treatment and support of people with drug and alcohol problems until that service was awarded to the Turning Point charity in January 2013
- Grovely – formerly a day hospital which closed in 2010; in 2014 it reopened as a base for mental health community teams
- Heathwood – a day facility providing psychological therapies and physiotherapy
- Memory services.

== See also ==
- Healthcare in Bristol
- Healthcare in Somerset
- Healthcare in Wiltshire
- List of hospitals in England
