= Glass break detector =

Sensor used in electronic burglar alarms

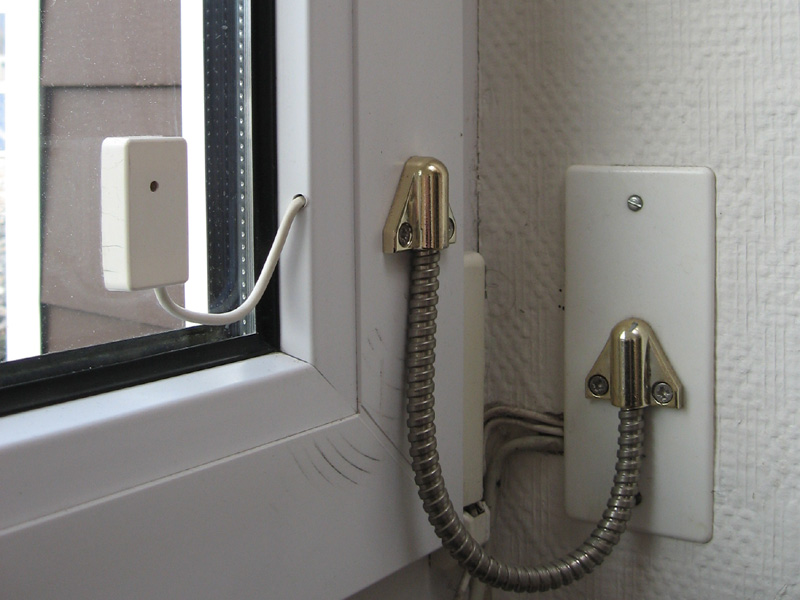
Passive glass break detector.

A glass break detector is a sensor that detects if a pane of glass has been shattered or broken. These sensors are commonly used near glass doors or glass storefront windows. They are widely used in electronic burglar-alarm systems.

The detection process begins with a microphone that picks up noises and vibrations coming from the glass. If the vibrations exceed a certain threshold (which is sometimes user selectable), then they are analyzed by detector circuitry. Simpler detectors merely use narrowband microphones tuned to frequencies typical of glass shattering. These are merely designed to react to sound magnitudes above a certain threshold, whereas more complex designs analytically compare the sound to one or more glass-break profiles using signal transforms similar to DCT and FFT. These digitally sophisticated detectors only react if both the amplitude threshold and statistically expressed similarity threshold are breached. Advances in technology have also led to the use of wireless glass-break detectors.

== See also ==
- Chubb Locks
- Yale (company)
- Burglar alarm
