= Andrew Chubb =

Australian pianist (born 1975)

Andrew Chubb (born 1975 in Sydney, Australia) is a Newcastle, New South Wales based pianist, composer, teacher, and lecturer. Since 1999, he has taught and lectured at the Newcastle Conservatorium of Music, University of Newcastle, Australia.

As a pianist, Chubb has always taken interest in a variety of classical repertoire including performing contemporary minimalist piano works, especially those of the American composer Philip Glass.

By 2006, he was the first and only Australian pianist who had publicly performed the main cycle of published solo piano works by Glass. These concerts were given at the Newcastle Conservatorium Concert Hall in 2002, 2003, 2006, and the Newcastle City Hall, the Brisbane Conservatorium of Music in 2007 and Saint Mary's University in Halifax, Canada in 2008.

In 2007 he gave the Australian premiere of the large-scale 75min solo piano work, The Book of Sounds, by the late German composer, Hans Otte and in the same concert on the Australian made Stuart & Sons piano the World Premiere of his own solo piano work, Meditation at Bar Beach. In recent years, Andrew Chubb has devoted time to composition and since 2004, has had works published by Publications by Wirripang.

In 2007, Andrew Chubb collaborated with Australian photographer Allan Chawner in a project of images and music entitled Bar Beach...Beyond the Sea which was exhibited at the Newcastle Region Art Gallery. This collaboration featured Chubb's solo piano work, Meditation at Bar Beach. In October 2008, he toured Canada as pianist and composer including an exhibition of his collaborative work Bar Beach...Beyond the Sea at Saint Mary's University in Halifax, Canada.

Performances of his compositions are heard throughout Australia, Canada and Europe.
