= Chub Lake (Dakota County, Minnesota) =

Lake in the state of Minnesota, United States

- Location within Minnesota
- Location: Dakota County, Minnesota
- Coordinates: 44°33′55″N 93°13′01″W
- Basin countries: United States
- Surface area: 274 acres (1.1 km^{2})
- Max. depth: 10 ft (3.0 m)
- Surface elevation: 965 ft (294 m)

Chub Lake is a lake in Dakota County, Minnesota, United States.

The lake was named after the chub fish.
