= Chub Creek =

Stream in Minnesota, United States

Coordinates: 44°30′58″N 93°00′49″W

Chub Creek is a stream in Dakota and Goodhue counties, in the U.S. state of Minnesota.

Chub Creek was named after the chub fish.

== See also ==
- List of rivers of Minnesota
