= Westminster Group =

Security company in Oxfordshire, United Kingdom

- Company type: Public limited company
- Traded as: AIM: WSG
- Industry: Security Products & Services
- Founded: 1988
- Headquarters: Westminster House, Banbury, United Kingdom
- Area served: Worldwide

The Westminster Group is an English security company, headquartered in Banbury, Oxfordshire, United Kingdom.

== Corporate history ==
Westminster was founded in 1988 as a security systems business, Westminster Security Systems, supplying systems and equipment to the UK domestic and commercial marketplace.

In 1990, Westminster Security Systems was acquired by Menvier-Swain Group Plc, at which time Peter Fowler joined the group as Managing Director.

In 1996 Peter Fowler led a management buyout and in 1999 acquired London-based business, CSG (Fire and Security) Ltd. A restructuring in October 2000 resulted in the sale of Westminster Security Systems and its holding company, Westminster Security Group, to Chubb Electronic Security. The Westminster Group's land, buildings and manufacturing business, Westminster Technologies Ltd, were retained and transferred over to the new Westminster Group Plc. In 2007, Westminster Group was then listed on the AIM market of the London Stock Exchange.

In September 2021, Westminster Group won the prestigious Queen’s Award for Enterprise in International Trade.

== Recent history ==
Westminster Group signed with the Palace of Westminster to provide, replace and maintain all security screening equipment; and later on, including the Tower of London and Scottish Parliament.
