= Business Technology Association =

Founded in 1926, the Business Technology Association (BTA) serves office technology dealerships, resellers, manufacturers, distributors and service companies. Its core members — office technology dealerships — consult, provide services and sell hardware, software and supplies with the goal of helping businesses maximize their investment in devices and technology. The association offers its members various educational programs, information, research, legal services, publications and guidance. BTA is based in Kansas City, Missouri, United States.

BTA publishes Office Technology magazine and the BTA Hotline e-newsletter, provides benchmarking studies, reports and educational offerings.

== History ==
In January 1926, independent typewriter dealers gathered in Kansas City, Missouri, to form the National Association of Typewriter Dealers (NATD), which would eventually evolve into the Business Technology Association. The initial aim was to unify dealers across the country to share ideas and knowledge. The first officers were elected, and annual dues were set at $10.

In 1933, during Franklin D. Roosevelt's New Deal, the association was renamed the National Typewriter and Office Machine Dealers Association (NTOMDA). By 1943, it became the National Office Machine Dealers Association (NOMDA). In 1948, new office technologies like tape recorders and photo copy duplicators were introduced.

In 1955, NOMDA established a liaison committee with office machine manufacturers, and by 1957, the impact of electronic data processing was discussed at the convention. The 1960s saw advancements in transistor technology, making office equipment more portable and versatile. NOMDA commissioned a management study by Price Waterhouse in 1965, which recommended streamlining the board of directors and developing new information programs.

The 1970s brought significant changes with the introduction of electronic calculators by Japanese companies, making brands like Sharp and Canon prominent. However, the decade also presented challenges due to the rapid pace of technological advancements. The 1980s saw increased competition from large manufacturers, but NOMDA emphasized the stability and professionalism of independent dealers. In 1985, NOMDA established its National Education Center in Kansas City.

In 1993, NOMDA merged with the Local Area Network Dealers Association (LANDA), forming a single organization representing a broad spectrum of business and technical expertise. This new entity was initially called NOMDA/LANDA but was later renamed the Business Technology Association in 1994. That same year, BTA merged with the Association of Independent Mailing Equipment Dealers (AIMED).

The BTA has consistently adapted to technological changes while maintaining its core values of community and citizenship. Today, it continues to operate from its headquarters in Kansas City, supporting its members in a rapidly evolving marketplace.

== See also ==
- Trade association
- Typewriter
- Photocopier
- Multi-function printer
