= Chubb Locks =

English manufacturer

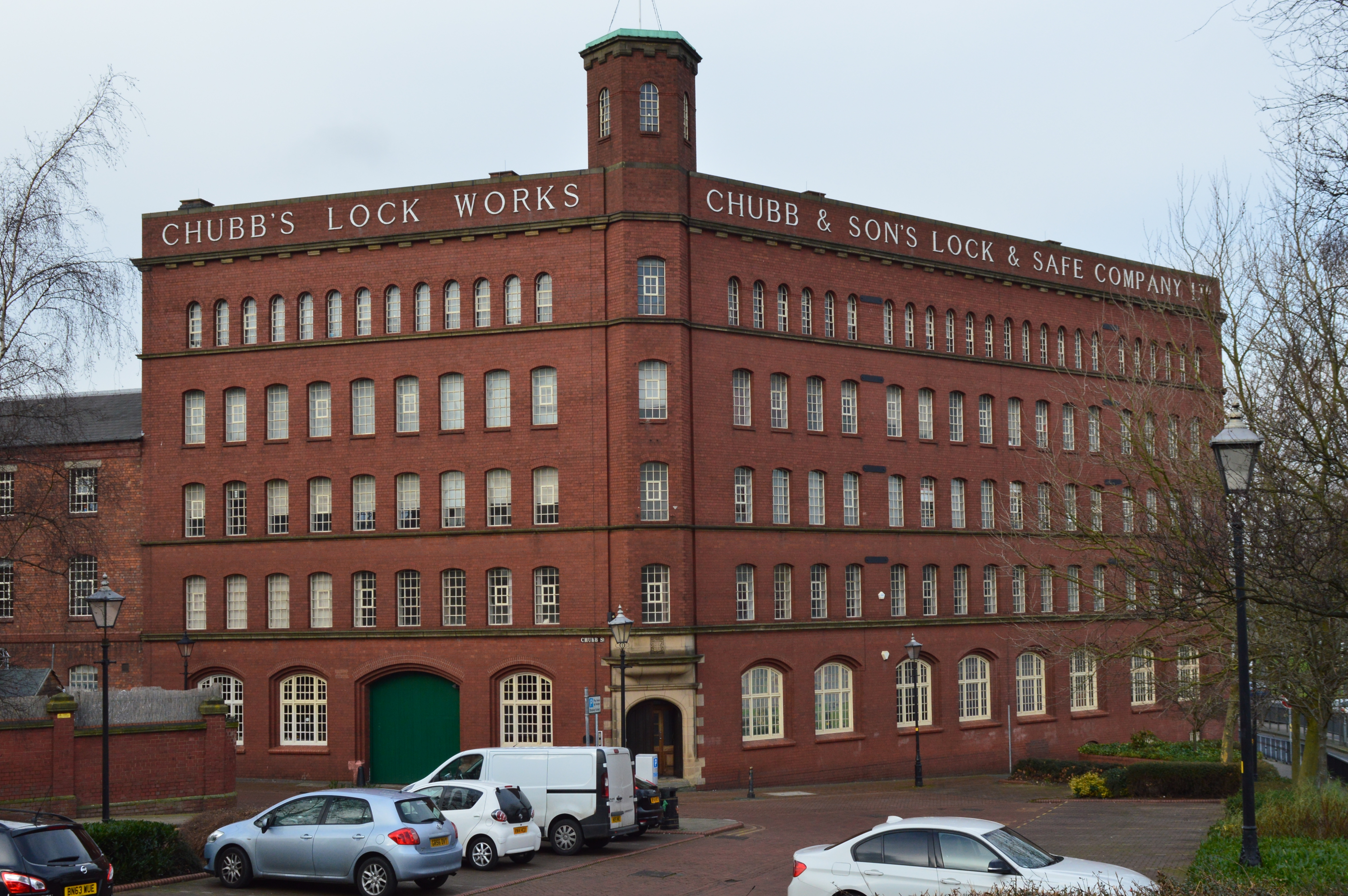
The former Chubb factory in Wolverhampton, England, which is still known as the Chubb Building

Chubb Locks is a former brand name of the Mul-T-Lock subsidiary of the Assa Abloy Group, which manufactures locking systems for residential, secure confinement and commercial applications. When the brand licence expired in 2010, the name ceased to be used, with the same locks sold as Yale or Union locks.

== History ==
Chubb was started as a ship's ironmonger by Charles Chubb in Winchester, England, and then moved to Portsmouth, England, in 1804. Chubb moved the company into the locksmith business in 1818, in Wolverhampton. The company worked out of a number of premises in Wolverhampton, including the purpose-built factory on Railway Street, still known today as the Chubb Building. His brother Jeremiah Chubb then joined the company, and they sold Jeremiah's patented detector lock.

In 1823, the company was awarded a special licence by King George IV, and later became the sole supplier of locks to the General Post Office (GPO), and a supplier to His Majesty's Prison Service. In 1835, they received a patent for a burglar-resisting safe, and opened a safe factory in London in 1837. In 1851, they designed a special secure display case for the Koh-i-Noor diamond for its appearance at The Great Exhibition.

In the late 1960s, the company, working with Smiths Industries, introduced its first automated teller machine (ATM) called the Chubb MD2. The MD2's first customer was National Westminster Bank, who installed their first Chubb ATMs in 1968.

In August 1984, the company was purchased by Racal under the chairmanship of Ernest Harrison. After the group was floated out from Racal, in February 1997 it was bought by Williams plc. In August 2000, they were sold to Assa Abloy. In 2006, Chubb was merged into the group Mul-T-Lock within Assa Abloy. The Chubb Electronic Security subsidiaries produce smoke detectors, fire alarms, burglar alarms and glass break detectors.

In 2010, the "Chubb Locks" brand licence expired, and Assa Abloy decided not to renew. The products are still sold, but rebranded as Yale and Union locks, other well known brands owned by Assa Abloy.

== See also ==
- Chubb Security
- Baron Hayter
- Glass break detector
- Yale (company)
- Business Technology Association
- Westminster Group
- Security lighting
- Fire alarms
- Burglar alarms
