= Charles Chubb (businessman) =

English lock and safe manufacturer (1779-1845)

- Born: Charles Chubb; 1779; Fordingbridge, Hampshire, England
- Died: 16 May 1845 (aged 65–66); Islington, Middlesex, now London England
- Resting place: Highgate Cemetery
- Occupations: Locksmith, Lock & Safe Manufacturer
- Known for: Chubb Locks & Safes
- Spouse: Maria Heyter (1775–1846)
- Relatives: Jeremiah Chubb (1790–1847); John Chubb (1816–1872)

Charles Chubb (1779 – 1846) was an English lock and safe manufacturer.

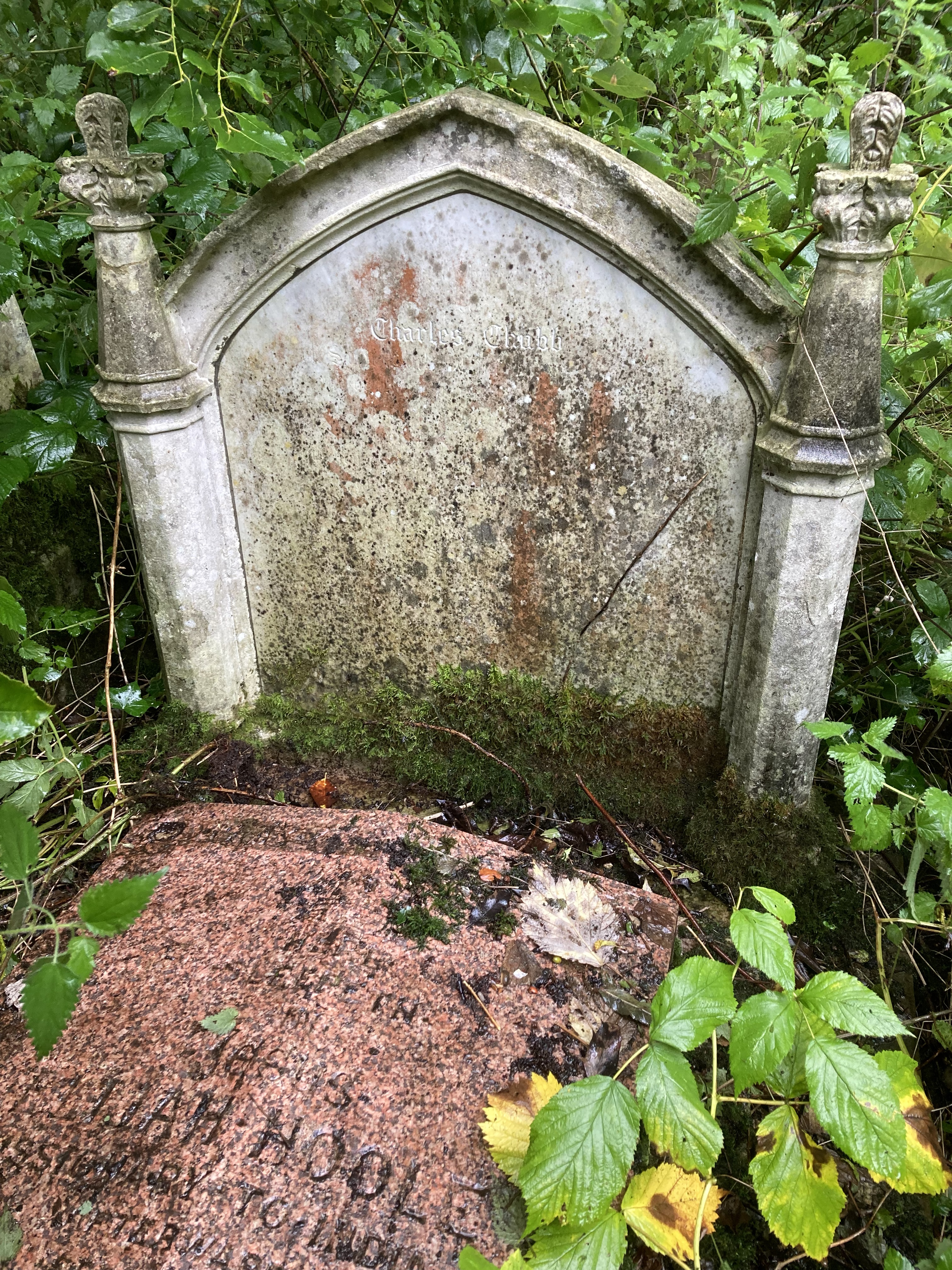
Grave of Charles Chubb in Highgate Cemetery

== Life ==
Born in Fordingbridge, Hampshire, he trained as a blacksmith who started a hardware business at Winchester then moved to Portsea, Portsmouth. Here he improved on the "detector" lock, originally patented in 1818 by his brother, Jeremiah Chubb.

He soon moved to London and then to Wolverhampton, where he employed 200 workers. In 1835, he patented a process intended to render safes burglar-proof and fireproof, and subsequently established a large safe-factory in London. He died on 16 May 1846, and was succeeded in the business by his son, John Chubb (1816–1872), who patented various improvements in the products of the firm and greatly increased its output. The factories were combined under one roof in a model plant and the business grew to enormous proportions, now Chubb Locks.

Charles Chubb was buried on the 22 May 1846 in the western side of Highgate Cemetery. His plot (no.1847) is in the dissenters section, immediately behind the family grave of the missionary Elijah Hoole.
