= Le Gourmet Chef =

- cook. eat. entertain.
- Company type: Subsidiary
- Industry: Retail
- Founded: 1988
- Defunct: 2019
- Fate: Closed as part of Kitchen Collection liquidation
- Headquarters: Chillicothe, Ohio, United States
- Number of locations: 77 stores
- Area served: Nationwide
- Key people: Gregory H. Trepp (CEO)
- Products: Kitchenwares, Housewares, and Specialty Foods
- Owner: NACCO Industries
- Parent: Kitchen Collection
- Website: www.legourmetchef.com

Le Gourmet Chef was a high-end American consumer retail company specializing in gourmet foods and kitchenware products. It was a subsidiary of Kitchen Collection, owned by NACCO Industries. Le Gourmet Chef is headquartered in Chillicothe, Ohio.

== History ==
Le Gourmet Chef, Inc. was founded in 1988. On August 8, 2006, it filed for Chapter 11 bankruptcy protection. The company was acquired by Kitchen Collection on August 28, 2006.

== Kitchen Collection liquidation ==
On October 15, 2019, Kitchen Collection, which was a parent of Le Gourmet Chef, announced that it would close all 160 of its stores by the end of 2019.
