= Fractional-horsepower motor =

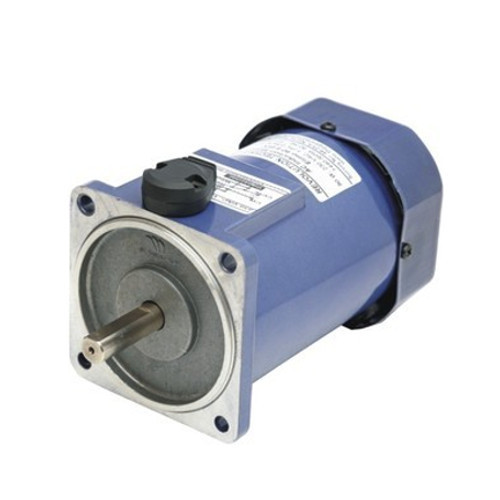

A fractional-horsepower motor (FHP) is an electric motor with a rated output power of less than one horsepower (745.7 W) (the term 'fractional' indicates less than one unit). There is no defined minimum output; however it is generally accepted that a motor with a frame size of less than 35mm square can be referred to as a 'micro-motor'.

Fractional-horsepower electric motors are exempt from the US Energy Policy Act of 2005 and the new EN 60034-30:2009 ruling of European directive 2005/32/EC concerning the efficiency classes of low-voltage three-phase asynchronous motors.

== History ==
The earliest commercially successful electric motors date back to the late 19th century when Nikola Tesla patented his induction motor in 1888.

Fractional-horsepower (FHP) motors would not have been developed without the push toward urban, and later rural, electrification, using alternating current. Electrification began in cities around 1900, and Chester Beach, an employee of Hamilton-Beach company, invented a high-speed fractional motor in 1905, which the company used in its milkshake machine, the Cyclone Drink Mixer, introduced in 1910, and sold to urban drugstores for use in their soda fountains. Within a few years it was found in most drugstores.

With electrification came the potential market for washing machines, refrigerators, vacuum cleaners and a host of other commercial appliances. This was recognised by major manufacturers, like Westinghouse and General Electric, who were already manufacturing large motors for industrial installations. By 1920, over 500,000 FHP motors were powering washing machines and other appliances in America.

After World War II there was a new surge in FHP motor manufacturing as the demand for consumer goods increased. Since that time, demand for these environmentally-friendly motors has continued to grow, particularly throughout the consumerist boom of the 1950s and 60s, and the number of applications that they can be used for continues to rise. For example, most automotive systems, power tools, small machines and appliances use FHP motors. In 2000, the European FHP market was worth an estimated $4.5 billion with some 300 million units in manufacture. Because of their practicality, they continue to be incredibly popular. In 2017, experts estimated that the European FHP market was worth around US$4.5 billion.

== Precision motors ==
Servo motors and stepper motors are specialist types of fractional-horsepower electric motors usually intended for high-precision or robotics applications. Usually running from a DC supply, when combined with a planetary gearbox they can offer accuracies less than 8 arc-minutes (2/15ths of a degree, or about 2.3 milliradians). Due to their specialized nature, however, these types of motors tend to be expensive compared with standard, or general-purpose lower-precision units.

== Applications ==
Fractional-horsepower motors are used across a wide range of industries and applications for a variety of motion and compression needs. The largest portion of sales can be attributed to the automotive sector, accounting for some 35% of all FHP motor sales, driving auxiliary applications such as electric windows, windshield wipers, powered seats, wing mirrors, central locking systems, roof openers, and trunk (UK English: boot) openers. In Europe, the majority of these applications are fulfilled by the industry's largest players: Brose (formerly Siemens), Bosch, and Nidec (formerly Valeo).

The second-largest area of consumption is the field of white goods, and small domestic appliances (approximately 12% of the European market). For example, FHP motors are being used to drive pumps and compressors in refrigerators, coffee machines, and washing machines, and they provide suction in vacuum cleaners and a variety of other switching and motion tasks across the ever-increasing variety of domestic products. Until the recent divestment of its motors interests, Electrolux was believed to be Europe's largest manufacturer of FHP motors for domestic-appliance applications.

Industrial applications consume a similar number of units to domestic products: FHP motors are used across a variety of conveyance and process applications.

Other applications include: pumps & compressors, medical devices, portable tools, office machinery, and HVAC. Development of this type of motors increased with the growth of popularity in e-bikes.
