= Hyster =

American manufacturing company

- Formerly: Willamette-Ersted Company
- Company type: Manufacturing
- Industry: Material Handling
- Founded: 1929; 97 years ago, in Portland, Oregon
- Headquarters: United States
- Website: www.hyster.com/en-us/north-america/

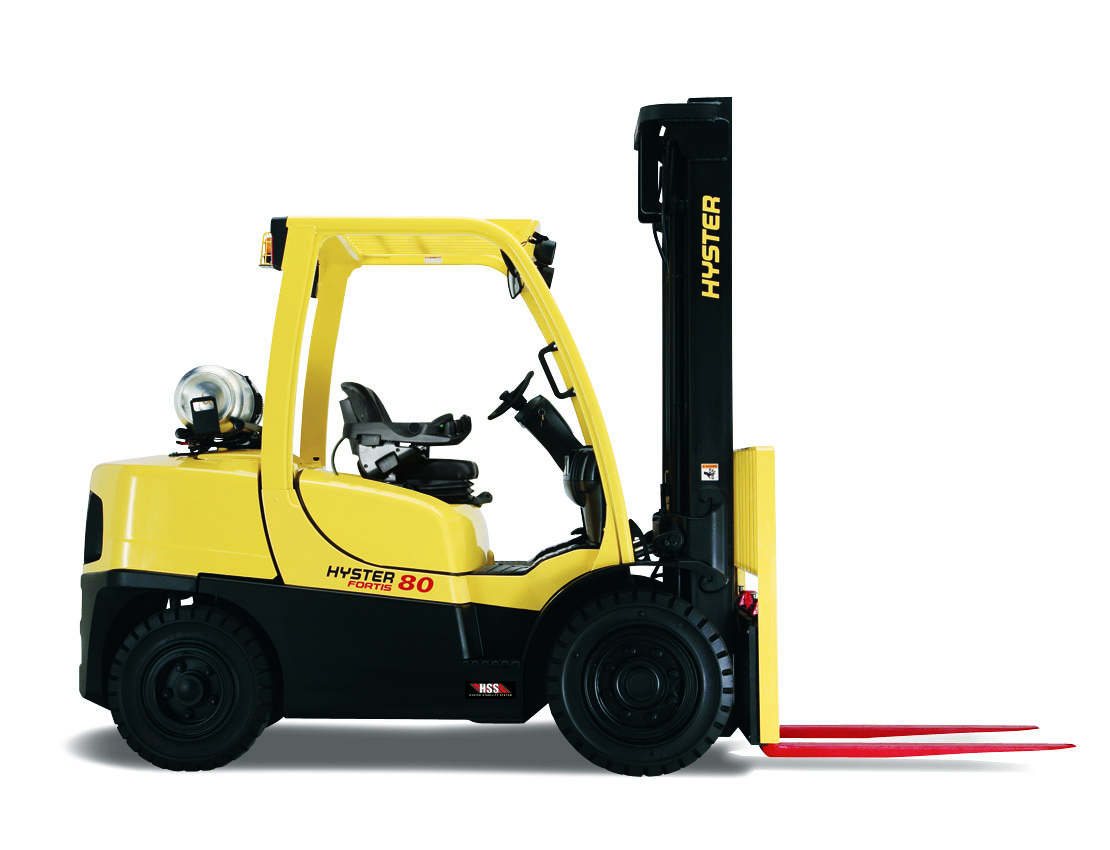
Hyster H80FT Fortis model

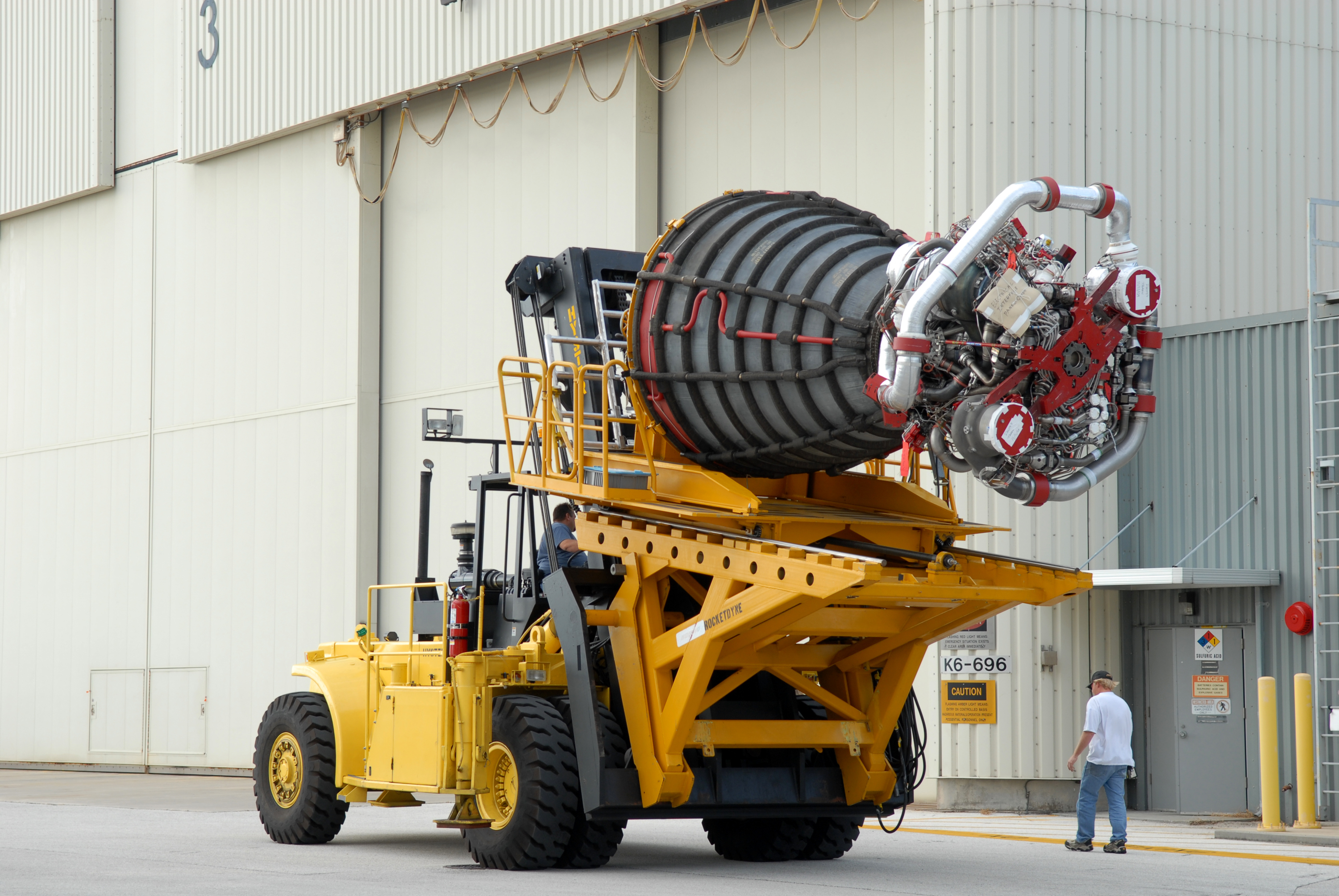
One Space Shuttle main engine on a special Hyster forklift

Hyster is an American manufacturing company specializing in forklifts and other materials-handling equipment. Hyster was founded in 1929 as the Willamette-Ersted Company in Portland, Oregon. The company was purchased in 1989 by NACCO Industries, Inc. and became a part of NACCO Materials Handling Group. NACCO spun off the materials handling business in 2012 as Hyster-Yale Materials Handling, Inc., which continues to market products under the Hyster brand name.

The name "Hyster" was allegedly derived from a term commonly used by logging workers in the Pacific Northwest at the end of the 19th century. When a load of lumber was ready to be transported, a logger would yell "hoist 'er". According to the Hyster Company web page, this term became synonymous with Hyster trucks.

Distribution and support for Hyster products is organized around major world regions: North America; Latin America; Europe, the Middle East and Africa; Asia – Pacific. Hyster also manufactured a successful line of compaction machinery and road-rollers, including machines for earth compaction, garbage compaction and asphalt compaction. Through the 1960s and 1970s Hyster was a major force in these types of machinery in America and they produced a wide range of models with many successful design concepts. Hyster was eventually absorbed into Bomag America/Compaction America (now known as HYPAC) and some models including a small articulated rubber tire roller sold under the Hypac name is an original descendant of the Hyster machine.

Hyster also made a successful line of logging winches and compactor attachments, both of which could be attached to other manufacturers' machines including Caterpillar. The Hyster name has been associated with forklift trucks for many decades, however, Hyster was also prominent manufacturer of compaction equipment. From the 1950s through the 1980s they had a comprehensive and well-regarded line of products. Along with the Raygo company these two manufacturers were perhaps the best known in the US, until European and other brands became common.

Hyster's home office was in Portland, Oregon, but they also had manufacturing plants in Berea, Danville, Peoria and Kewanee Illinois, the Netherlands, China, Australia, Brazil, Canada, Craigavon Northern Ireland and South Africa, and a specialist engineering department in Irvine, Scotland.
