= Powered industrial truck =

Machines used to move goods

In legal terms of the United States, a powered industrial truck (PIT) is a specialized motor vehicle defined in several standards: ANSI B56.1-1969 (PIT is a “mobile, power propelled truck used to carry, push, pull, lift, stack, or tier material.”), the OSHA 29 CFR 1910.178 “Powered Industrial Trucks” regulation and its standard interpretations depending on industry type: general industry, marine terminals, longshoring, and construction. OSHA defines PITs as "forklifts, tractors, platform lift trucks, motorized hand trucks, and other specialized industrial trucks powered by electric motors or internal combustion engines." The OSHA regulation specifically excludes "compressed air or nonflammable compressed gas-operated industrial trucks, nor to farm vehicles, nor to vehicles intended primarily for earth moving or over-the-road hauling". OSHA also says that its scope matches that of ANSI B56.1-1969 and some other ASME standards, including ASME B56.6. ASME B56.6 (Rough Terrain Forklift Trucks) excludes loaders with buckets replaced with forks. The June 27, 2011 OSHA interpretation further clarifies that the classification of a vehicle as a PIT is determined by its design rather than the usage.
