= North American Coal Corporation =

- Company type: Subsidiary
- Industry: Mining
- Founded: 1913
- Headquarters: Dallas, Texas, United States
- Number of locations: 8 mines
- Key people: Alfred M. Rankin Jr. (Chairman) and Robert L. Benson (President and Chief Executive Officer)
- Products: Coal
- Parent: NACCO
- Divisions: Florida Dragline Operations
- Subsidiaries: Caddo Creek Resources Company, Demery Resources Company L.L.C, Liberty Fuels Company, L.L.C, Mississippi Lignite Mining Company, The Coteau Properties Company, The Falkirk Mining Company, The Sabine Mining Company,
- Website: www.nacoal.com

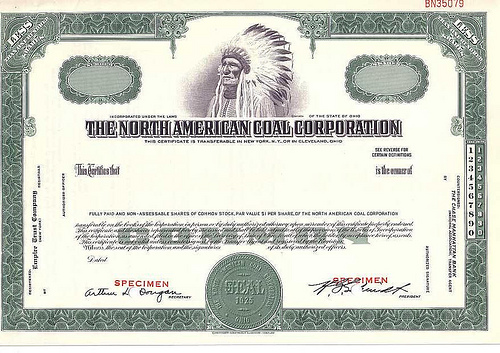
North American Coal Corporation Specimen Stock Certificate

North American Coal Corporation (NACC) is an American coal mining and mining services company. The company, now held as the main subsidiary of NACCO, is headquartered in Dallas, Texas and operates coal mines in North Dakota, Louisiana, Mississippi, and Texas. The company also contracts to provide dragline mining services to limestone quarries in Florida.

== Mines ==
North American Coal Corporation's coal mines are all surface mines producing lignite coal. At 35 million tons of annual production, NACC is the largest lignite coal producer in the United States, and also ranks among the top ten of all coal producers.

North American Coal Corporation Mines
Mine Name	State
Five Forks	Louisiana
Liberty Mine	Mississippi
Red Hills Mine	Mississippi
Falkirk Mine	North Dakota
Freedom Mine	North Dakota
Coyote Creek Mine	North Dakota
Eagle Pass	Texas
Caddo Creek	Texas
Sabine Mine	Texas

Of the above mines, three ranked among the largest United States coal mines by production in 2007:

- Freedom Mine, North Dakota: 15.0 million short tons produced in 2007, ranked 12th
- Falkirk Mine, North Dakota: 7.8 million short tons produced in 2007, ranked 21st
- Sabine, South Hallsville No 1 Mine, Texas: 4.2 million short tons produced in 2007, ranked 48th
