= Milkshake machine =

Machine for mainly commercial use

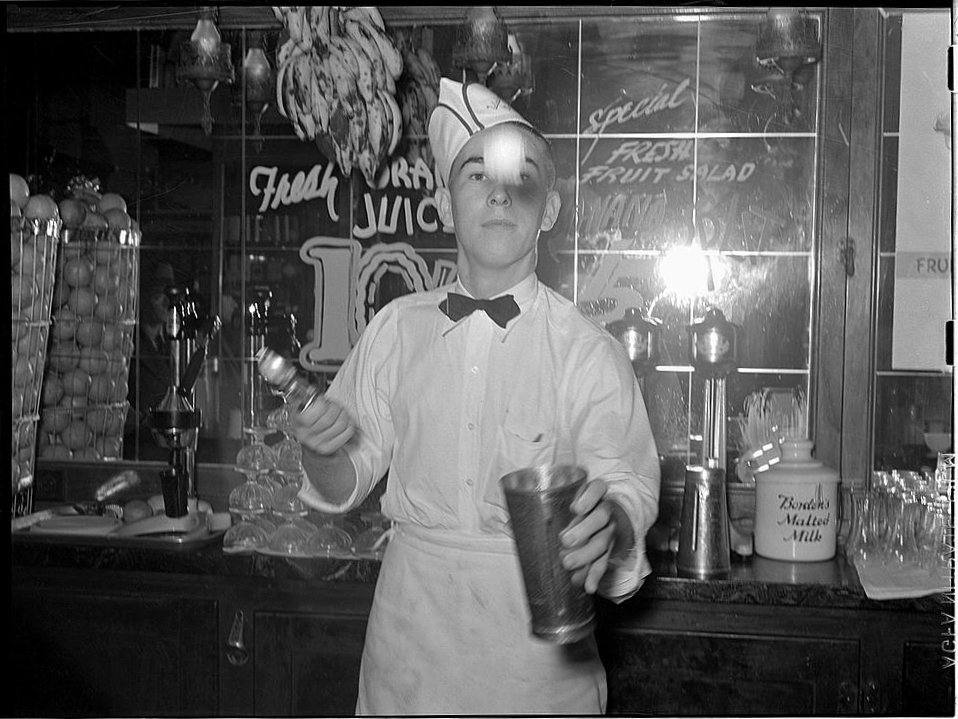
A soda jerk throws a scoop of ice cream into a malt cup. Behind him are two milkshake machines and an inverted malt cup.

A milkshake machine or drink mixer is a kind of countertop electric mixer used to make milkshakes, flavored milk, frappés, and other blended beverages. Milkshake machines are generally used in ice cream stores and fast food restaurants, and are not common as domestic appliances, where blenders are typically used instead.

== Overview ==
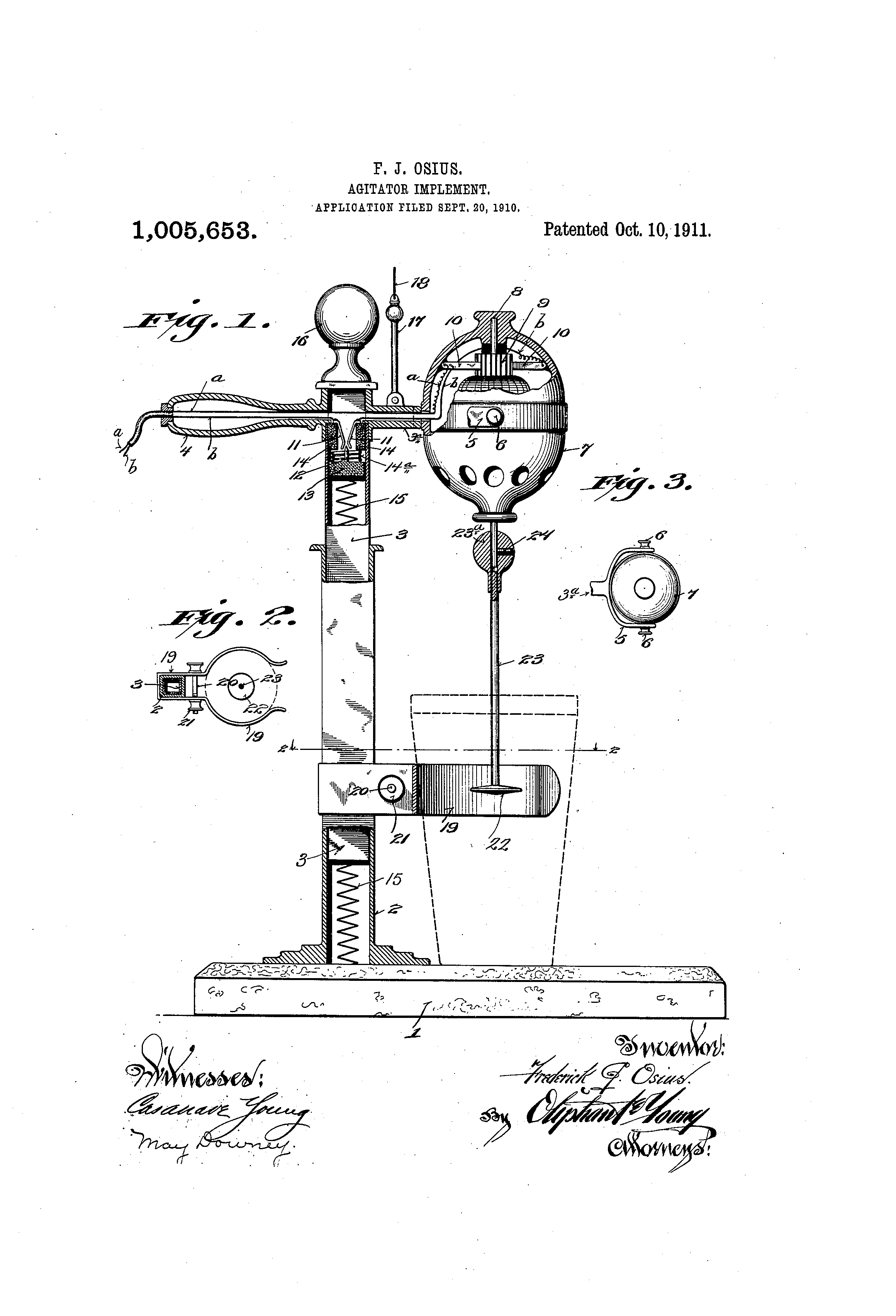
Patent drawing for the original drink blender, 1911

A milkshake machine consists of a stand for an electric motor and a removable cup, a "malt cup". The motor is connected to a vertical rod at the bottom of which is a small agitator of wavy metal or plastic. The cup is placed so that the agitator is submerged, and sits on the floor of the stand, or on a small bracket. The malt cup is a flared cup, usually of stainless steel.

== History ==
Manual, crank-driven milkshake machines were introduced by James Tufts in 1884, under the name Lightning Shaker.

The modern top-driven electric milkshake machine was invented by Frederick J. Osius in 1910, and commercialized by his Hamilton Beach company under the name Cyclone Drink Mixer.

Hamilton Beach continues to be a major brand, as are Waring and Proctor Silex.

== See also ==
- Milk frother
- Immersion blender
- Mixer (appliance)
- Drink mixer
