= Hyster-Yale Materials Handling =

United States manufacturing company

Hyster-Yale Materials Handling, Inc.
- Type: Public Company
- Traded as: NYSE: HY; Russell 2000 Component
- Founded: 2012 (as Hyster-Yale), 1844 (as Yale Lock Shop)
- Headquarters: Cleveland, Ohio, United States
- Products: Lift trucks
- Revenue: US$2,569.7 million(FY 2016)
- Operating income: US$34.9 million(FY 2016)
- Net income: US$42.8 million(FY 2016)
- Total assets: US$1,287.1 million(FY 2016)
- Total equity: US$463.8 million(FY 2016)
- Number of employees: 7,900
- Website: www.hyster-yale.com

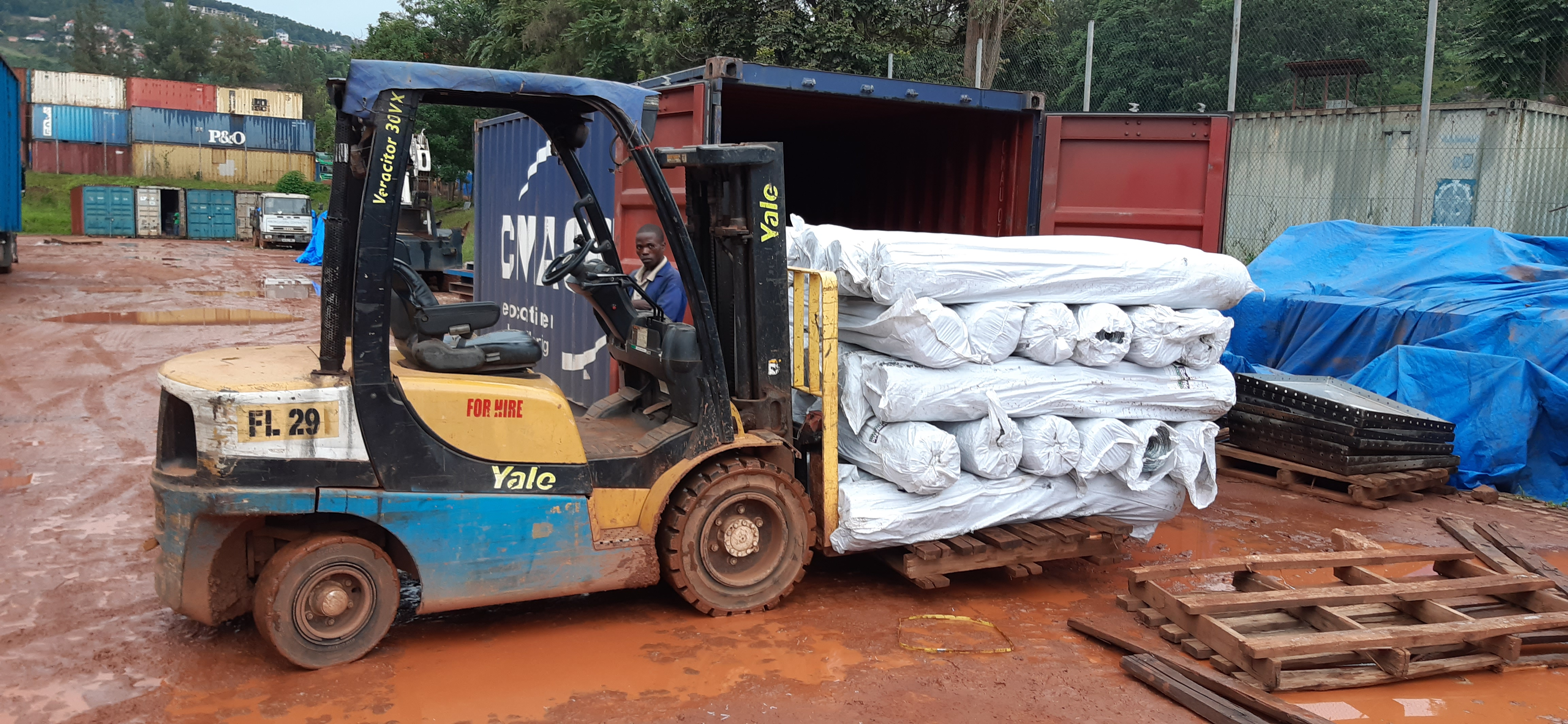
Yale lift truck in Rwanda (2020).

Hyster-Yale Materials Handling, Inc., through its wholly owned operating subsidiary, Hyster-Yale Group, Inc., designs, engineers, manufactures, sells and services a comprehensive line of lift trucks and aftermarket parts marketed globally primarily under the Hyster and Yale brand names. It was spun off from NACCO Industries in 2012, but had been running as a standalone company within NACCO since 2002.

Subsidiaries of Hyster-Yale Group include Nuvera Fuel Cells, LLC, an alternative-power technology company focused on fuel-cell stacks and related systems, on-site hydrogen production and dispensing systems, and Bolzoni S.p.A., a leading worldwide producer of attachments, forks and lift tables under the Bolzoni Auramo and Meyer brand names.

Hyster-Yale Materials Handling was listed as a Fortune 1000 company in 2014, 2015 and 2016.

== History ==
Yale Corporation logo

The company's origins are in the Hyster Company and the Yale Materials Handling Corporation, the latter of which started off as part of a lock company.

Yale Materials Handling Corporation is an American corporation that produces forklift trucks and other material handling equipment. Yale produced its first forklift truck in the 1920s under the name Yale & Towne Manufacturing. Yale & Towne Manufacturing was purchased in 1985 by the North American Coal Corporation (NACCO), which later became NACCO Industries, Incorporated. Yale Materials Handling Corporation was combined with Hyster Company, also purchased by NACCO, in 1989 to form NACCO Materials Handling Group. NACCO Materials Handling Group was then spun off as a separate public company from NACCO in 2012, under the name Hyster-Yale Materials Handling, Inc.
