= Hamilton Beach Brands =

American manufacturer of home appliances

Hamilton Beach Brands Holding Company
- Type: Public
- Traded as: NYSE: HBB; Russell 2000 Component
- Founded: April 1910
- Founder: Frederick J. Osius
- Headquarters: Glen Allen, Virginia, U.S.
- Area served: North America
- Products: Home appliances
- Revenue: ▼US$607 million (2025)
- Net income: ▼US$26.5 million (2025)
- Subsidiaries: Proctor Silex
- Website: hamiltonbeach.com

Hamilton Beach Brands Holding Company is an American designer, marketer and distributor of home appliances and commercial restaurant equipment marketed primarily in the United States, Canada, and Mexico, including blenders, mixers, toasters, slow cookers, clothes irons, and air purifiers.

Until sometime in the 1980s the company's products were marketed under the brand name "Hamilton Beach Scovill", reflecting a merger that occurred in 1923. In 1990, the company merged with Proctor Silex, another household appliance manufacturer. Key market competitors include Cuisinart, Black & Decker, Salton, De'Longhi, Sunbeam, and Zojirushi.

== History ==
Founded in April 1910 by inventor Frederick J. Osius in Racine, Wisconsin, the Hamilton Beach Manufacturing Company took its name from two men Osius hired, Louis Hamilton and Chester Beach. He hired Hamilton as the new company's advertising manager, and Beach to work as a mechanic. Osius did not care for his own name, so he paid Hamilton and Beach $1000 each for the right to use their names instead. The company mostly sold products that Osius had invented and patented. Still, Chester Beach had invented a high-speed fractional motor in 1905, which the company used in many of its products. Osius designed the agitator implement for the company's first milkshake machine, the Cyclone Drink Mixer, introduced in 1910. Hamilton and Beach left the company in 1913 to form their own firm, Wisconsin Electric Company. Osius sold Hamilton-Beach to Scovill Manufacturing in 1922 and moved to Millionaires' Row in Miami Beach. The Hamilton Beach drink mixer, with its characteristic spindle and metal container, was found at soda fountains of drug stores throughout North America. Other products included stand mixers (for making batter), fans, and hair dryers. The spindle drink mixer was expanded in the 1930s to enable multiple milkshakes to be processed at once. For a time, the brand was owned by NACCO Industries. The original company continues as the Hamilton Beach side of Hamilton Beach Brands, Inc. Since the 2000s, all of Hamilton Beach's appliances have been manufactured by subcontractors in China.

== Products ==
- Blenders
- Bread machines
- Coffeemakers
- Coffee grinders
- Coffee percolators
- Can openers
- Convection ovens
- Deep fryers
- Electric kettles
- Electric knives
- Food processors
- Freezers
- Ice cream makers
- Indoor grills
- Induction cooktops
- Juicers
- Mixers
- Microwave ovens
- Ovens
- Pie irons
- Pizza makers
- Popcorn makers
- Refrigerators
- Rice cookers
- Steamers
- Toaster ovens
- Toasters
- Waffle irons
