= Proctor Silex =

Company

- Type: Subsidiary
- Predecessor: Proctor Electric; Silex Company
- Founded: 1960
- Headquarters: Glen Allen, Virginia, U.S.
- Area served: North America
- Products: Home appliances
- Parent: Hamilton Beach Brands
- Website: www.proctorsilex.com

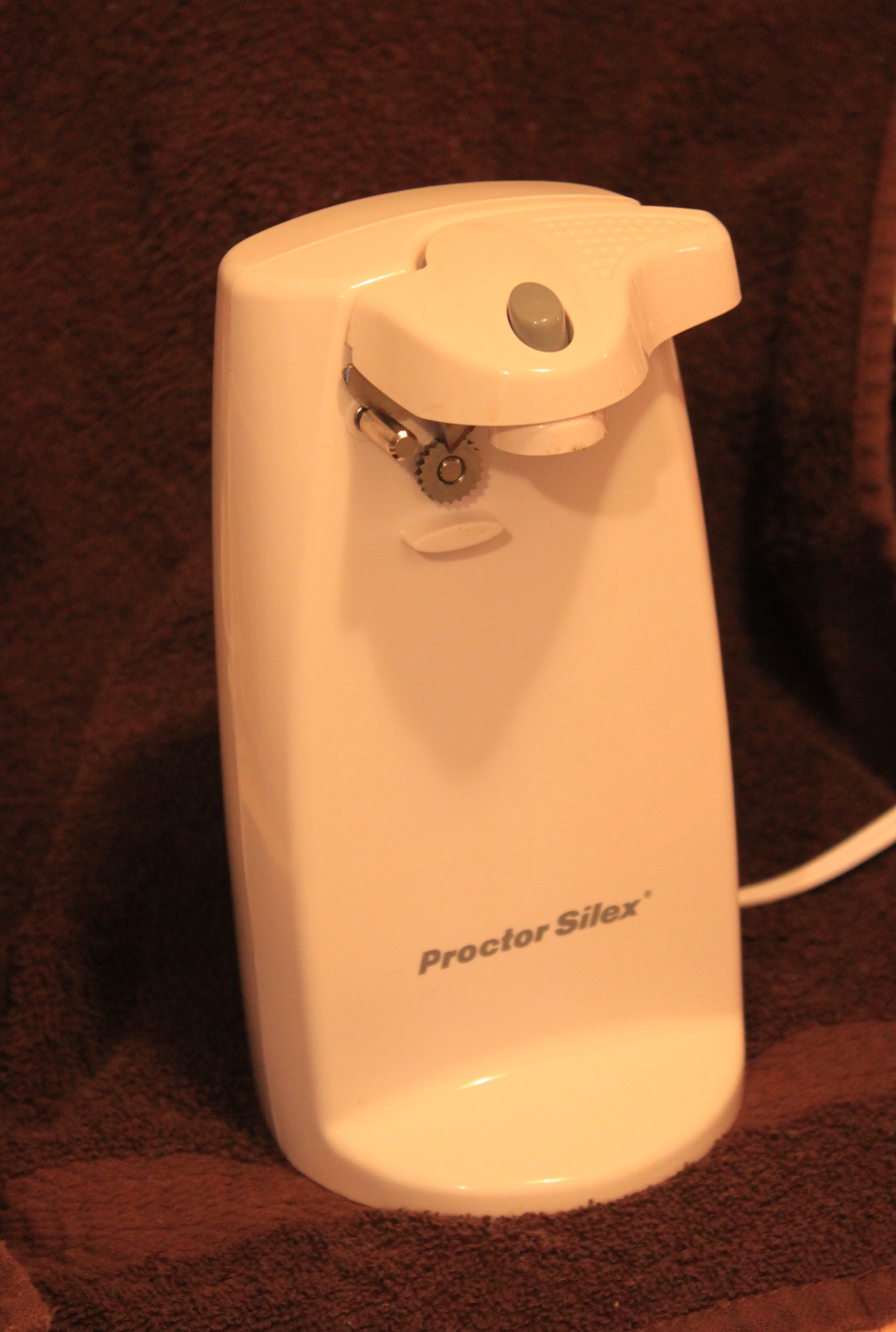
Proctor Silex electric can opener

Proctor Silex Co. was created in 1960 with the merger of Proctor Electric and the Silex Company. In 1966, SCM Corporation bought out Proctor-Silex. In 1988, Proctor Silex was acquired by NACCO Industries, Inc. In 1990. NACCO also acquired Hamilton Beach Brands and merged the two companies.

Proctor Silex made electrical household appliances like vacuum coffee makers.
