= NACCO Industries =

American publicly traded holding company

NACCO Industries, Inc.
- Type: Public Company
- Traded as: NYSE: NC; Russell 2000 Index component
- Founded: 1913
- Headquarters: Cleveland, Ohio, United States
- Key people: J.C. Butler, Jr. (Chief Executive Officer)
- Products: Service Mining
- Revenue: ▲US$140.0 million(FY 2019)
- Operating income: ▲US$56.1 million(FY 2019)
- Net income: ▲US$39.6 million(FY 2019)
- Total assets: ▲US$444.7 million(FY 2019)
- Total equity: ▲US$289.3 million(FY 2019)
- Number of employees: 2,400
- Divisions: North American Coal Corporation
- Website: www.nacco.com

NACCO Industries, Inc. is an American publicly traded holding company, headquartered in Cleveland, Ohio. Through a portfolio of mining and natural resources businesses, the company operates under three business segments: Coal Mining, North American Mining, and Minerals Management. The Coal Mining segment operates surface coal mines under long-term contracts with power generation companies and an activated carbon producer pursuant to a service-based business model. The North American Mining segment provides value-added contract mining and other services for producers of aggregates, lithium, and other minerals. The Minerals Management segment promotes the development of the company's oil, gas, and coal reserves, generating income primarily from royalty-based lease payments from third parties. In addition, the company has a business providing stream and wetland mitigation solutions.

== History ==
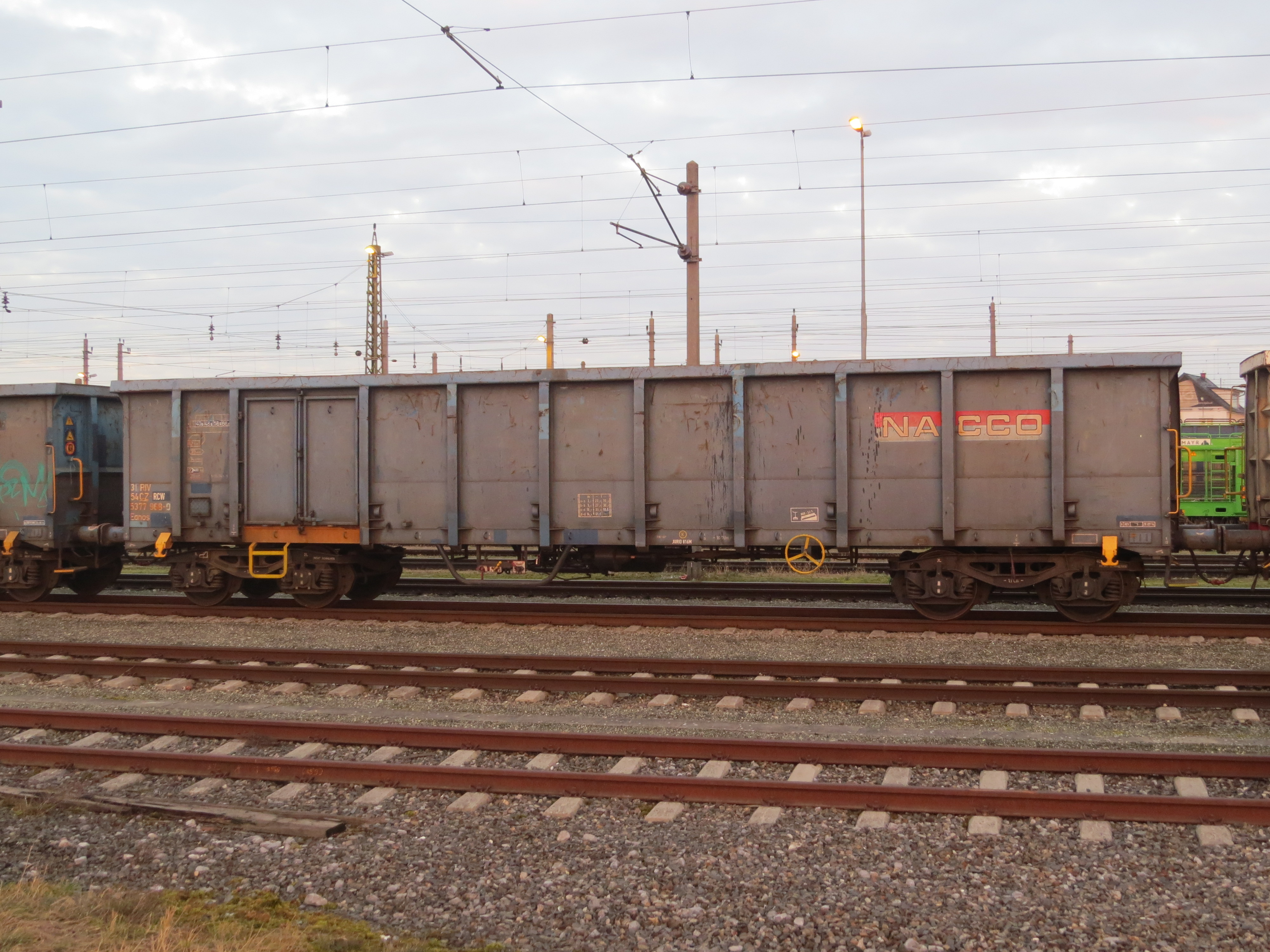
Wagon of NACCO at train station St. Valentin, Austria (2018)

NACCO Industries originated in 1913 with the incorporation of the Cleveland and Western Coal Company. The name was changed to The North American Coal Corporation (NACCO) in 1925, and the company operated exclusively in the coal industry until the acquisition of Yale Materials Handling Corporation in 1985. This was followed in 1986 by creation of the holding company under the name NACCO Industries, Inc. NACCO Industries expanded into housewares with the purchase of Proctor Silex in 1988 and Hamilton Beach in 1990, and expanded its presence in the materials handling industry by adding the Hyster Company in 1989. Yale Materials Handling Corporation and the Hyster Company were combined to form Hyster-Yale Materials Handling, which was spun off in 2012.
