= Forklift =

Powered industrial truck

- General appearance of a typical forklift
- Classification: Powered Industrial Truck (PIT)
- Industry: Various
- Fuel source: Gasoline; Propane; CNG; Diesel; Lead acid battery; Fuel cell; Li-ion battery
- Powered: Yes
- Wheels: Various wheel configurations
- Axles: 2–3
- Components: Power source; Mast; Frame; Counterweight; Cab; Axles; Wheels; Overhead guard; Load backrest; Hydraulic pump; Hydraulic lines; Hydraulic controls; Hydraulic cylinders and attachments

A forklift (also called industrial truck, lift truck, jitney, hi-lo, fork truck, fork hoist, and forklift truck) is a powered industrial truck used to lift and move materials over short distances. The forklift was developed in the early 20th century by various companies, including Clark, which made transmissions, and Yale & Towne Manufacturing, which made hoists.

Since World War II, the development and use of the forklift truck has greatly expanded worldwide. Forklifts have become an indispensable piece of equipment in manufacturing and warehousing. In 2013, the top 20 manufacturers worldwide posted sales of $30.4 billion, with 944,405 machines sold.

== History ==
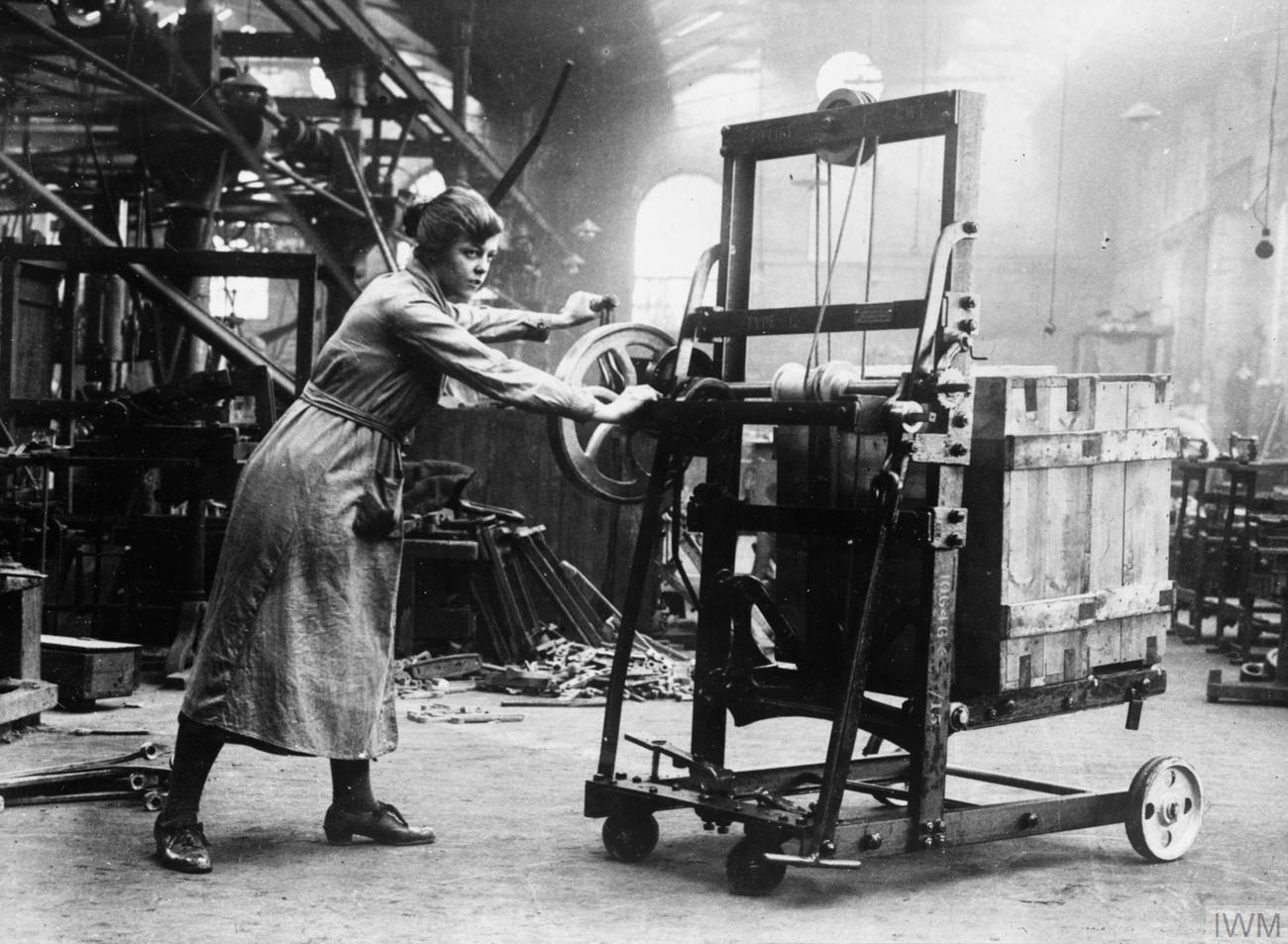
A hand-powered hoist on wheels for lifting and moving heavy objects, Bowling Iron Works, England, 1918

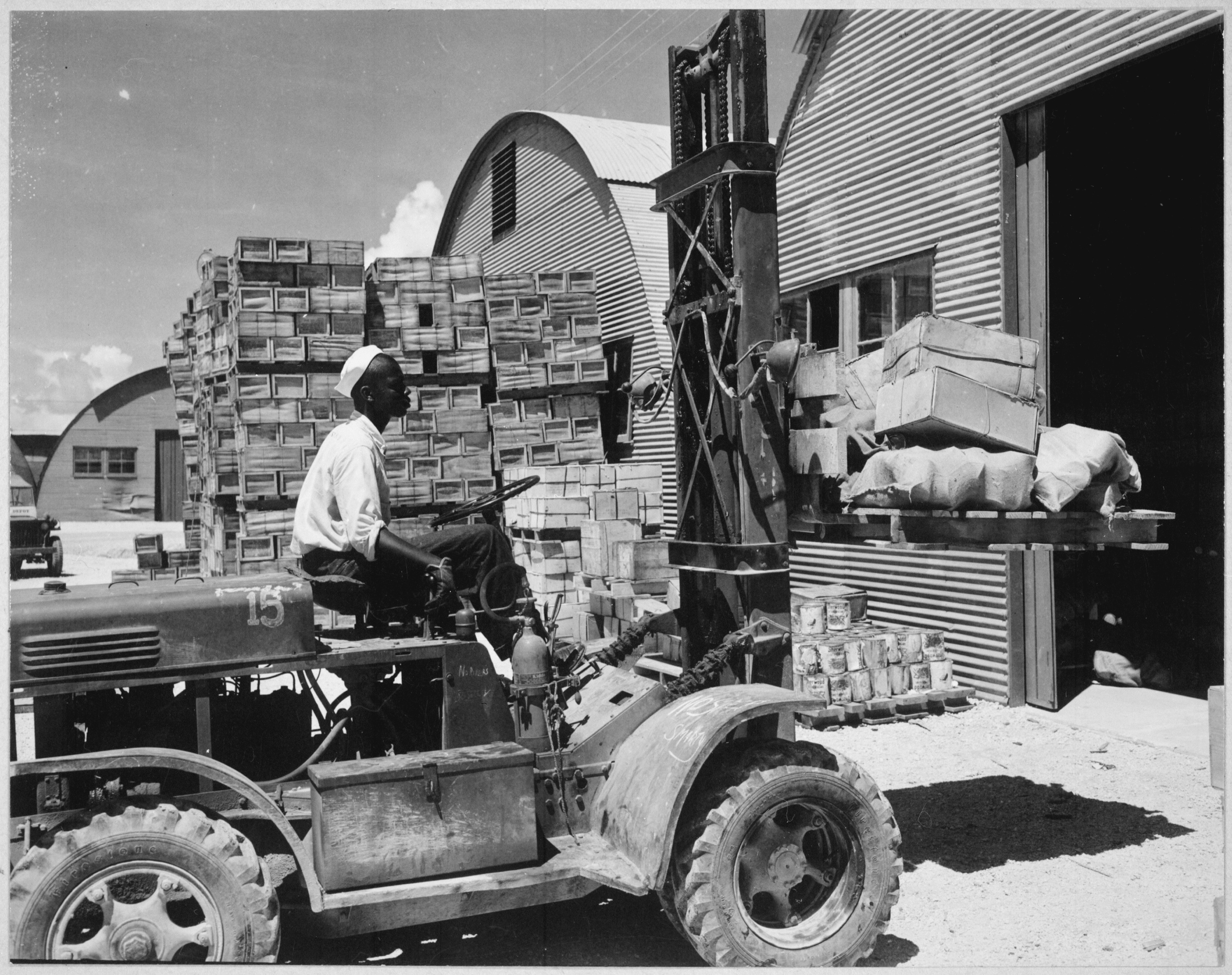
A forklift truck being used during World War II

The forerunners of the modern forklift were manually powered hoists to lift loads. In 1906, the Pennsylvania Railroad introduced battery-powered platform trucks for moving luggage at their Altoona, Pennsylvania, station.

World War I saw the development of different types of material-handling equipment in the United Kingdom by Ransomes, Sims & Jefferies of Ipswich. This was in part due to the labor shortages caused by the war. In 1917, Clark in the United States began developing and using powered and lift tractors in its factories. In 1919, the Towmotor Company and, in 1920, Yale & Towne Manufacturing, entered the lift truck market in the United States. Continuing development and expanded use of the forklift continued through the 1920s and 1930s. The introduction of hydraulic power and the development of the first electrically powered forklifts, along with the use of standardized pallets in the late 1930s, helped to increase the popularity of forklift trucks.

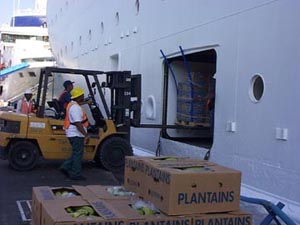
A forklift loading a cruise liner

The start of World War II, like World War I before it, spurred the use of forklift trucks in the war effort. Following the war, more efficient methods for storing products in warehouses were implemented, and warehouses needed more maneuverable forklift trucks that could reach greater heights. For example, in 1954, a British company named Lansing Bagnall, now part of KION Group, developed what was claimed to be the first narrow-aisle electric-reach truck. That development changed the design of warehouses leading to narrower aisles and higher load-stacking, which increased storage capability.

During the 1950s and 1960s, operator safety became a concern due to increasing lifting heights and capacities. Safety features such as load backrests and operator cages called overhead guards, began to be added to forklifts. In the late 1980s, ergonomic design began to be incorporated in new forklift models to improve operator comfort, reduce injuries, and increase productivity. During the 1990s, undesirable exhaust emissions from forklift operations began to be tackled, which led to emission standards being implemented for forklift manufacturers in various countries. The introduction of AC power forklifts, along with fuel cell technology, were refinements in continuing forklift development.

== Design ==
=== Components ===
A typical counterbalanced forklift contains the following components:

- Truck frame – the base of the machine to which the mast, axles, wheels, counterweight, overhead guard and power source are attached. The frame may have fuel and hydraulic fluid tanks constructed as part of the frame assembly.
- Counterweight – a mass attached to the rear of the forklift truck frame. The purpose of the counterweight is to counterbalance the load being lifted. In an electric forklift, the large battery may serve as part of the counterweight.
- Cab – the area that contains a seat for the operator along with the control pedals, steering wheel, levers, switches and a dashboard containing operator readouts. The cab area may be open-air or enclosed, but it is covered by the cage-like overhead guard assembly. When enclosed, the cab may also be equipped with a cab heater for cold climate countries along with a fan or air conditioning for hot weather.
- Overhead guard – a metal roof supported by posts at each corner of the cab that helps protect the operator from any falling objects. On some forklifts, the overhead guard is an integrated part of the frame assembly.
- Power source – may consist of an internal combustion engine that can be powered by LP gas, CNG, gasoline or diesel fuel. Electric forklifts are powered by either a battery or fuel cell that provides power to the electric motors; some fuel cell forklifts may be powered by multiple fuel cells at once. For warehouses and other indoor applications, electric forklifts have the advantage of not producing carbon monoxide.
- Tilt cylinders – hydraulic cylinders that are mounted to the truck frame and the mast. The tilt cylinders pivot the mast backwards or forwards to assist in engaging a load.
- Mast – the vertical assembly that does the work of raising and lowering the load. It is made up of interlocking rails that also provide lateral stability. The interlocking rails may either have rollers or bushings as guides. The mast is driven hydraulically, and operated by one or more hydraulic cylinders directly or using chains from the cylinder or cylinders. It may be mounted to the front axle or the frame of the forklift. A 'container mast' variation allows the forks to raise a few meters without increasing the total height of the forklift. This is useful when double-loading pallets into a container or under a mezzanine floor.
- Carriage – the component to which the forks or other attachments mount. It is mounted into and moves up and down the mast rails by means of chains or by being directly attached to the hydraulic cylinder. Like the mast, the carriage may have either rollers or bushings to guide it in the interlocking mast rails.
- Load backrest – a rack-like extension that is either bolted or welded to the carriage in order to prevent the load from shifting backward when the carriage is lifted to full height.
- Attachments – may consist of a mechanism that is attached to the carriage, either permanently or temporarily, to help in the proper engagement of the load. A variety of material-handling attachments are available. Some attachments include sideshifters, slipsheet attachments, carton clamps, multipurpose clamps, rotators, fork positioners, carpet poles, pole handlers, container handlers and roll clamps.
- Tires – either solid for indoor use, or pneumatic for outside use.

=== Attachments ===
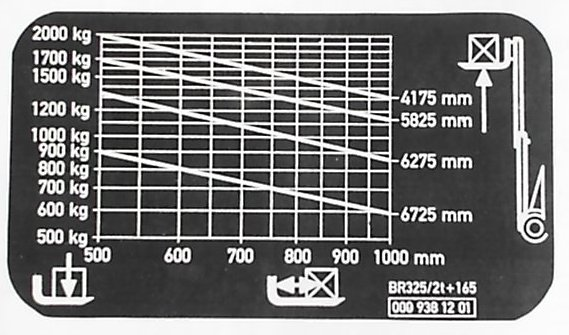
A typical load capacity chart

Common forklift attachments include:

- Dimensioning devices – fork truck-mounted dimensioning systems provide dimensions for the cargo to facilitate truck-trailer space utilization and to support warehouse automation systems. The systems normally communicate the dimensions via 802.11 radios. NTEP-certified dimensioning devices are available to support commercial activities that bill based on volume.
- Sideshifter – a hydraulic attachment that allows the operator to move the tines (forks) and backrest laterally. This allows easier placement of a load without having to reposition the truck.
- Rotator – to aid the handling of skids that may have become excessively tilted, and for other specialty material-handling needs, some forklifts are fitted with an attachment that allows the tines to be rotated. This type of attachment may also be used for dumping containers for quick unloading.
- Fork positioner – a hydraulic attachment that moves the tines (forks) together or apart. This removes the need for the operator to manually adjust the tines for different-sized loads.
- Roll and barrel clamp attachment – a mechanical or hydraulic attachment used to squeeze the item to be moved. It is used for handling barrels, kegs, or paper rolls. This type of attachment may also have a rotate function. The rotate function would help an operator to insert a vertically stored paper into the horizontal intake of a printing press for example.
- Pole attachments – in some locations, such as carpet warehouses, a long metal pole is used instead of forks to lift carpet rolls. Similar devices, though much larger, are used to pick up metal coils.
- Carton and multipurpose clamp attachments – hydraulic attachments that allow the operator to open and close around a load, squeezing it to pick it up. Products like cartons, boxes and bales can be moved with this type of attachment. With these attachments in use, the forklift truck is sometimes referred to as a clamp truck.
- Slip sheet attachment (push-pull) – a hydraulic attachment that reaches forward, clamps onto a slip sheet and draws the slip sheet onto wide and thin metal forks for transport. The attachment will push the slip sheet and load off the forks for placement.
- Drum handler attachment – a mechanical attachment that slides onto the tines (forks). It usually has a spring-loaded jaw that grips the top lip edge of a drum for transport. Another type grabs around the drum in a manner similar to the roll or barrel attachments.
- Man basket – a lift platform that slides onto the tines (forks) and is meant for hoisting workers. The man basket has railings to keep the person from falling and brackets for attaching a safety harness. Also, a strap or chain is used to attach the man basket to the carriage of the forklift.
- Telescopic forks – hydraulic attachments that allow the forklift to operate in warehouses designed for "double-deep stacking", which means that two pallet shelves are placed behind each other without any aisle between them.
- Scales – fork truck-mounted scales enable operators to efficiently weigh the pallets they handle without interrupting their workflow by travelling to a platform scale. Scales are available that provide legal-for-trade weights for operations that involve billing by weight. They are easily retrofitted to the truck by hanging on the carriage in the same manner as forks hang on the truck.
- Single-double forks – forks that in the closed position allow movement of a single pallet or platform but when separated, turn into a set of double forks that allow carrying two pallets side by side. The fork control may have to replace the side-shifter on some lift trucks.
- Snow plough – a mechanical attachment that allows the forklift operator to easily and quickly move snow. The snow plough can often also be utilised at other times of the year as an attachment to clean up workplaces.
- Skips – a mechanical attachment that is fitted to the forklift to allow safe and speedy removal of waste to the appropriate skip or waste compactor. There are two types of skips: the roll-forward type and the bottom-emptying type.

=== Control and capabilities ===
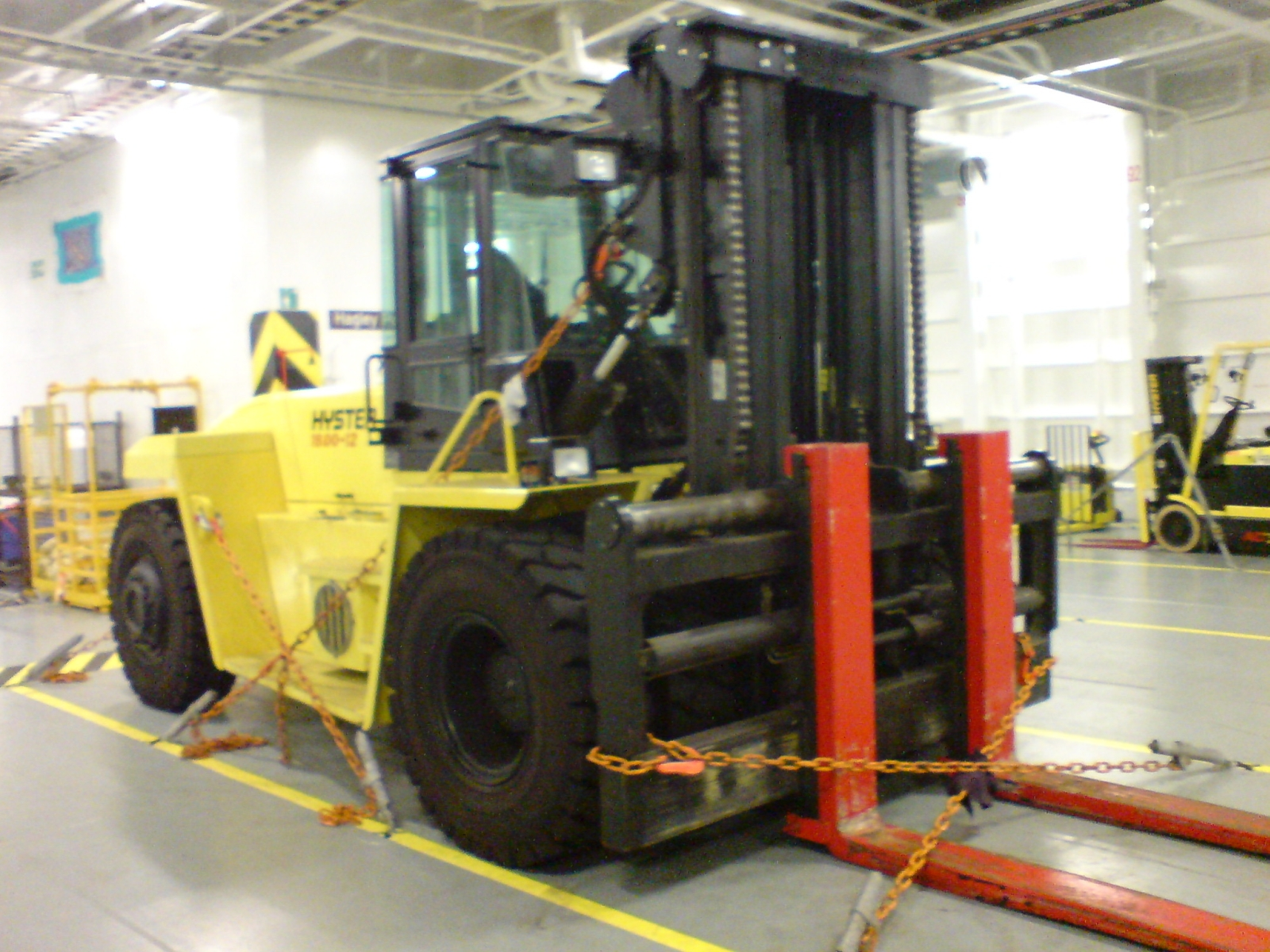
Dedicated container forklift of HMNZS Canterbury vessel of the Royal New Zealand Navy

Forklift hydraulics are controlled either with levers directly manipulating the hydraulic valves or by electrically controlled actuators, using smaller "finger" levers for control. The latter allows forklift designers more freedom in ergonomic design.

Forklift trucks are available in many variations and load capacities. In a typical warehouse setting, most forklifts have load capacities between one and five tons. Larger machines, up to 50 tons lift capacity, are used for lifting heavier loads, including loaded shipping containers.

In addition to a control to raise and lower the forks (also known as blades or tines), the operator can tilt the mast to compensate for a load's tendency to angle the blades toward the ground and risk slipping off the forks. Tilt also provides a limited ability to operate on non-level ground. Skilled forklift operators annually compete in obstacle and timed challenges at regional forklift rodeos.

=== Propulsion ===
Internal combustion engines used in forklifts may be diesel, kerosene, gasoline, natural gas, butane, or propane-fueled, and may be either two-stroke spark ignition, four-stroke spark ignition (common), two-stroke compression ignition, and four-stroke compression ignition (common). North American Engines come with advanced emission control systems. Forklifts built in countries such as Iran or Russia will typically have no emission control systems. Liquefied petroleum gas (LPG) forklifts use an internal combustion engine modified to run on LPG. The fuel is often stored in a gas cylinder mounted to the rear of the truck. This allows for quick changing of the cylinder once the LPG runs out. LPG trucks are quieter than their diesel counterparts, while offering similar levels of performance.

Battery-electric forklifts are powered by lead-acid batteries or, increasingly, lithium-ion batteries; battery-electric types include: cushion-tire forklifts, scissor lifts, order pickers, stackers, reach trucks and pallet jacks. Electric forklifts are primarily used indoors on flat, even surfaces. Batteries prevent the emission of harmful fumes and are recommended for indoor facilities, such as food-processing and healthcare sectors. Forklifts have also been identified as a promising application for reuse of end-of-life automotive batteries.

Fuel cell forklifts are powered by a chemical reaction between hydrogen and oxygen. The reaction is used to generate electricity which can then be stored in a battery and subsequently used to drive electric motors to power the forklift. This method of propulsion produces no local emissions, can be refueled in three minutes, and is often used in refrigerated warehouses as its performance is not degraded by lower temperatures. As of 2024, approximately 50,000 hydrogen forklifts are in operation worldwide (the bulk of which are in the U.S.), as compared with 1.2 million battery electric forklifts that were purchased in 2021.

== Operation ==
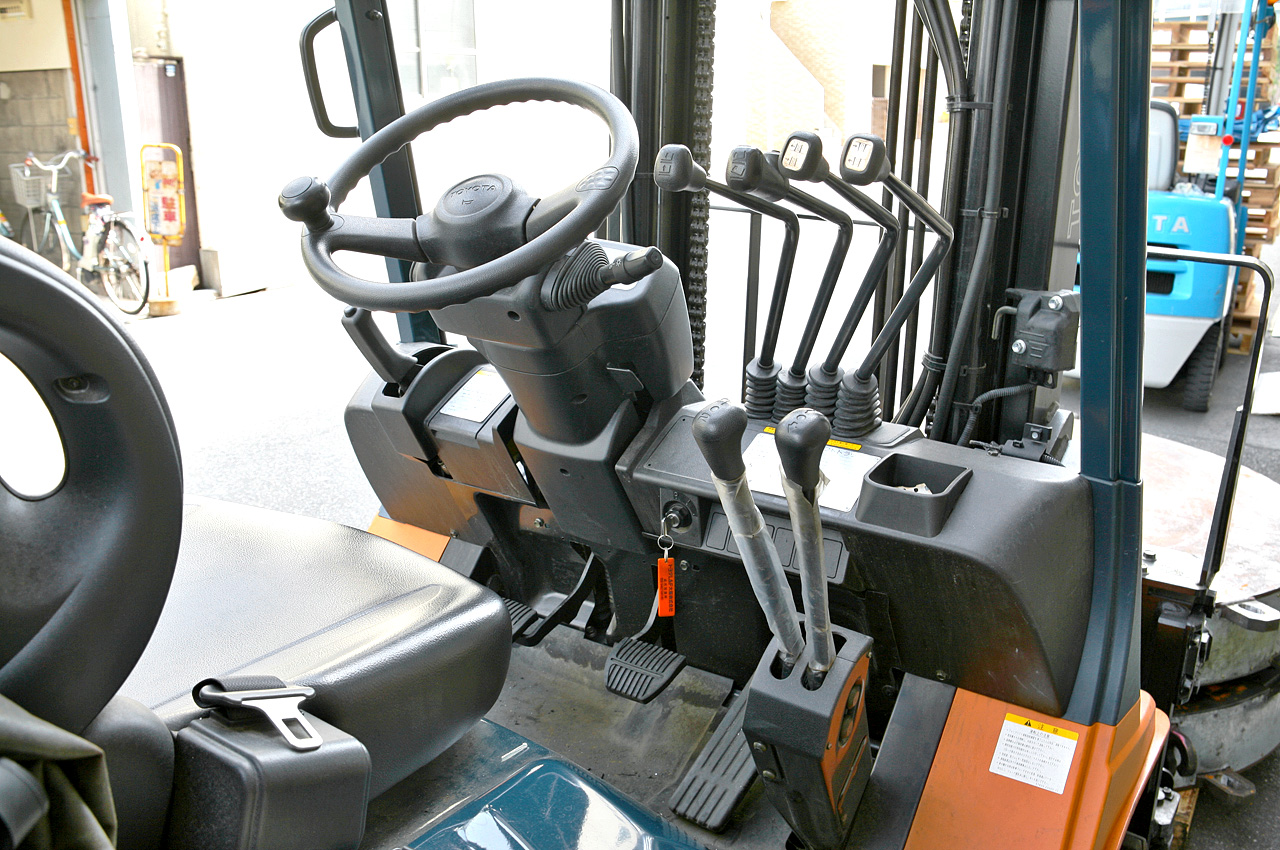
Forklift cab with control layout

Forklifts are rated for loads at a specified maximum weight and a specified forward center of gravity. This information is located on a nameplate provided by the manufacturer, and loads must not exceed these specifications. In many jurisdictions, it is illegal to alter or remove the nameplate without the permission of the forklift manufacturer.

An important aspect of forklift operation is that it must have rear-wheel steering. While this increases maneuverability in tight cornering situations, it differs from a driver's traditional experience with other wheeled vehicles. While steering, as there is no caster action, it is unnecessary to apply steering force to maintain a constant rate of turn.

Another critical characteristic of the forklift is its instability. The forklift and load must be considered a unit with a continually varying center of gravity with every movement of the load. A forklift must never negotiate a turn at speed with a raised load, where centrifugal and gravitational forces may combine to cause a tip-over accident. The forklift is designed with a load limit for the forks which is decreased with fork elevation and undercutting of the load (i.e., when a load does not butt against the fork "L"). A loading plate for loading reference is usually located on the forklift. A forklift should not be used as a personnel lift without the fitting of specific safety equipment, such as a "cherry picker" or "cage".

Forklifts are a critical element of warehouses and distribution centers. It is considered imperative that these structures be designed to accommodate their efficient and safe movement. In the case of Drive-In/Drive-Thru Racking, a forklift needs to travel inside a storage bay that is multiple pallet positions deep to place or retrieve a pallet. Often, forklift drivers are guided into the bay by guide rails on the floor and the pallet is placed on cantilevered arms or rails. These maneuvers require well-trained operators. Since every pallet requires the truck to enter the storage structure, damage is more common than with other types of storage. In designing a drive-in system, dimensions of the fork truck, including overall width and mast width, must be carefully considered.

== Common types ==
=== Low lift truck ===
Powered pallet truck, usually electrically powered. Low lift trucks may be operated by a person seated on the machine, or by a person walking alongside, depending on the design.

=== Stacker ===
Usually electrically powered. A stacker may be operated by a person seated on the machine, or by a person walking alongside, depending on the design.

=== Reach truck ===
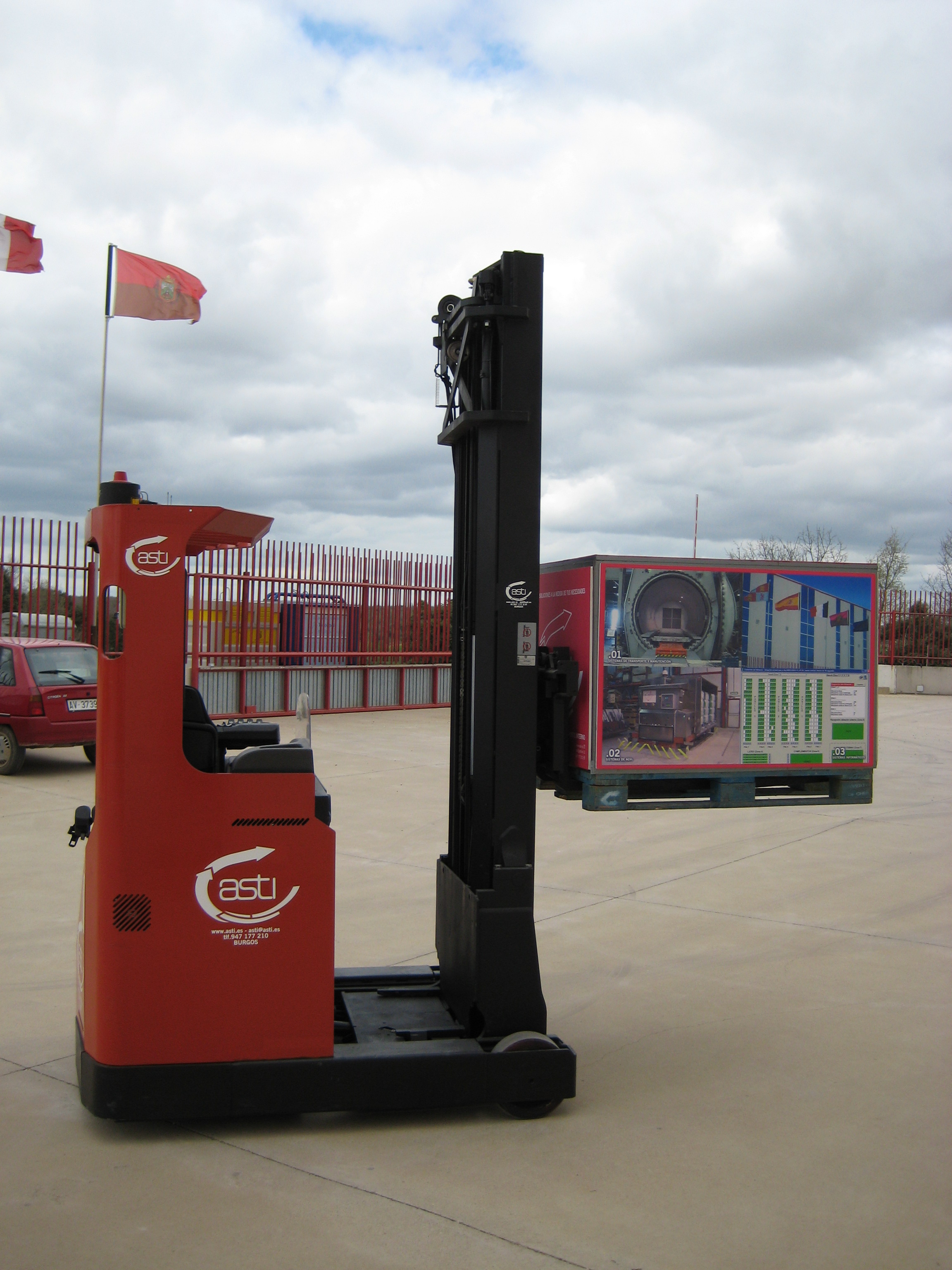
A reach truck with a deployable tower mast holding a pallet

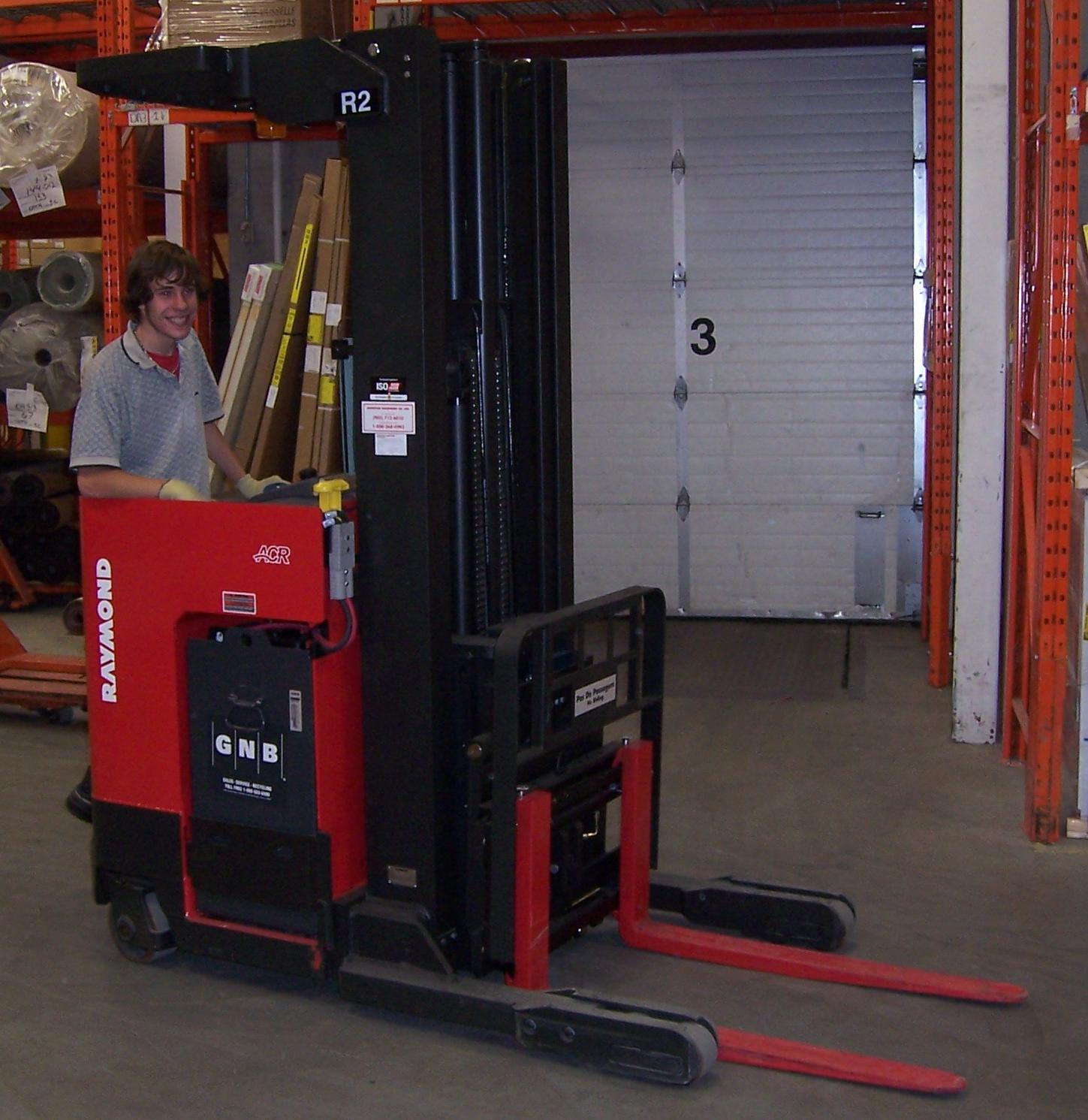
A reach truck with a pantograph allowing the extension of the forks in tight aisles.

Variant on a Rider Stacker forklift, designed for narrow aisles. They are usually electrically powered and often have the highest storage-position lifting ability. A reach truck's forks can extend to reach the load, hence the name. There are two types:

- Moving carriage. This consists of an integrated tower mast that's fixed and the forks are mounted on a deployable carriage or pantograph, typically with hydraulic or electro-mechanical actuators or in a scissor formation. They are common in North America and parts of Europe.
- Moving mast; which consists of a slender tower mast that is mounted on tracks, allowing the entire assembly to extend or 'reach' using hydraulic or electro-mechanical actuators. It also eliminates a separate fork extender pantograph. They are common in the rest of the world, and generally considered safer.

=== Counterbalanced forklift ===
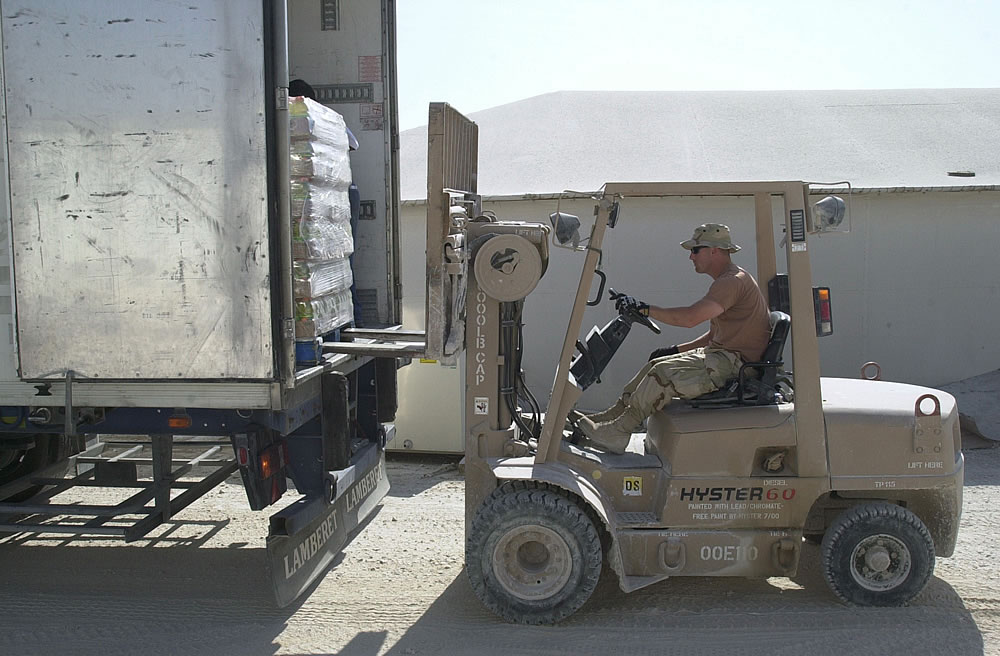
A counterbalance forklift (note the counterweight at the back) being used to load logistics at an air force base

Standard forklifts use a counterweight at the rear of the truck to offset, or counterbalance, the weight of a load carried at the front of the truck. Electric-powered forklifts utilise the weight of the battery as a counterweight and are typically smaller in size as a result.

=== Sideloader ===
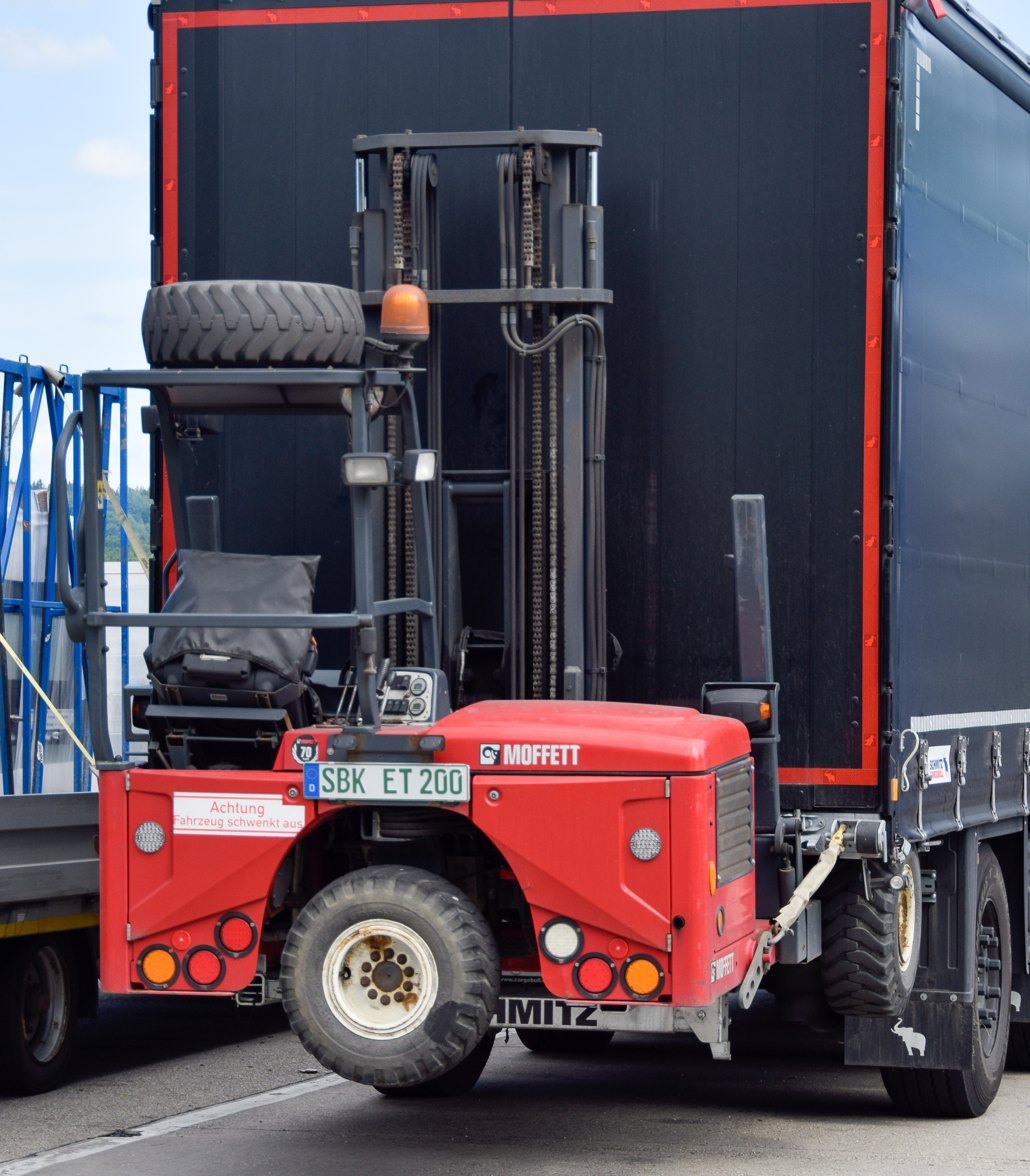
Truck mounted sideloader

A sideloader is a piece of materials-handling equipment designed for long loads. The operator's cab is positioned up front on the left-hand side. The area to the right of the cab is called the bed or platform. This contains a central section within it, called the well, where the forks are positioned. The mast and forks reach out to lift the load at its central point and lower it onto the bed. Driving forwards with a load carried lengthways allows long goods, typically timber, steel, concrete or plastics, to be moved through doorways and stored more easily than via conventional forklift trucks.

=== Order-picking truck ===
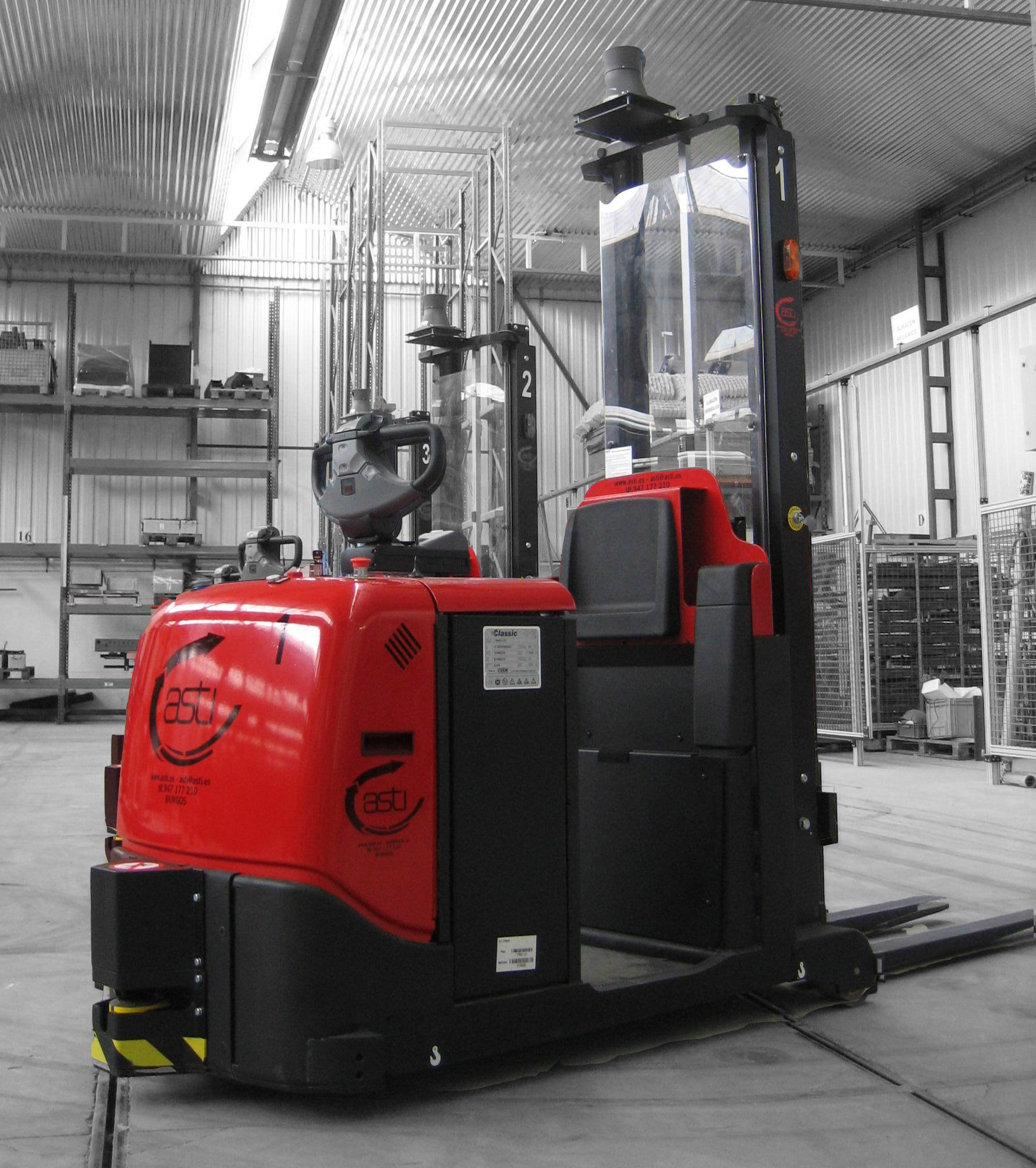
A ride-on order picking truck

Similar to a reach truck, except the operator either rides in a cage welded to the fork carriage or walks alongside, dependent on design. If the operator is riding in the order picking truck, they wear a specially designed safety harness to prevent falls. A special toothed grab holds the pallet to the forks. The operator transfers the load onto the pallet one article at a time by hand. This is an efficient way of picking less-than-pallet-load shipments and is popular for use in large distribution centers.

=== Guided very-narrow-aisle truck ===
A counterbalance-type sit-down rider electric forklift fitted with a specialized mast assembly. The mast is capable of rotating 90 degrees, and the forks can then advance like on a reach mechanism, to pick up full pallets. Because the forklift does not have to turn, the aisles can be exceptionally narrow, and if wire guidance is fitted in the floor of the building the machine can almost work on its own. Masts on this type of machine tend to be very high. The higher the racking that can be installed, the higher the density the storage can reach. This sort of storage system is popular in cities where land prices are very high, as by building the racking up to three times higher than normal and using these machines, it is possible to stock a much larger amount of material in a building with a relatively small surface area.

=== Guided very-narrow-aisle order picking truck ===
Counterbalance-type order-picking truck similar to the guided very-narrow-aisle truck, except that the operator and the controls which operate the machine are in a cage welded to the mast. The operator wears a restraint system to protect them against falls. Otherwise, the description is the same as guided very-narrow-aisle truck.

=== Truck-mounted forklift ===
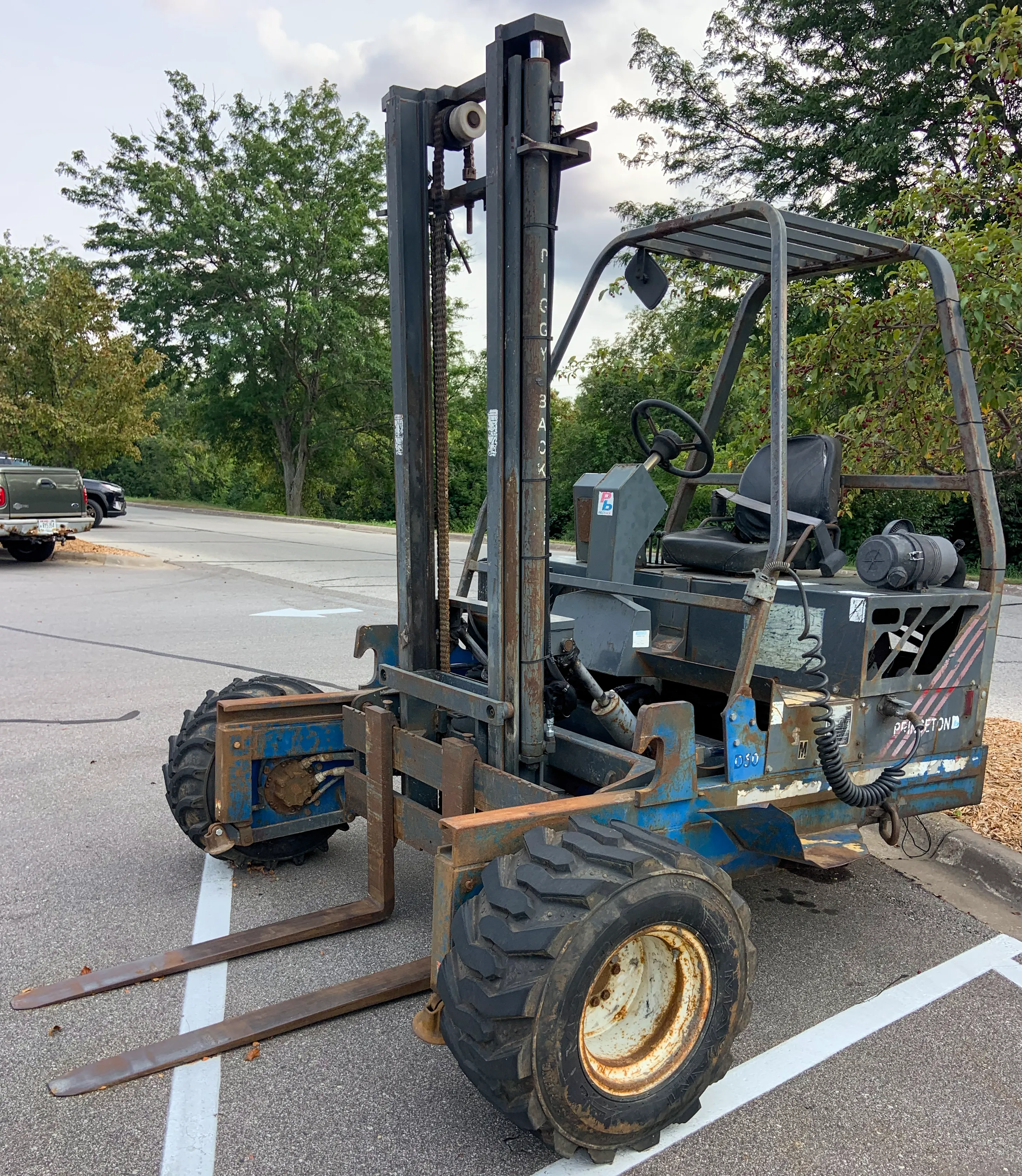
Moffett forklift

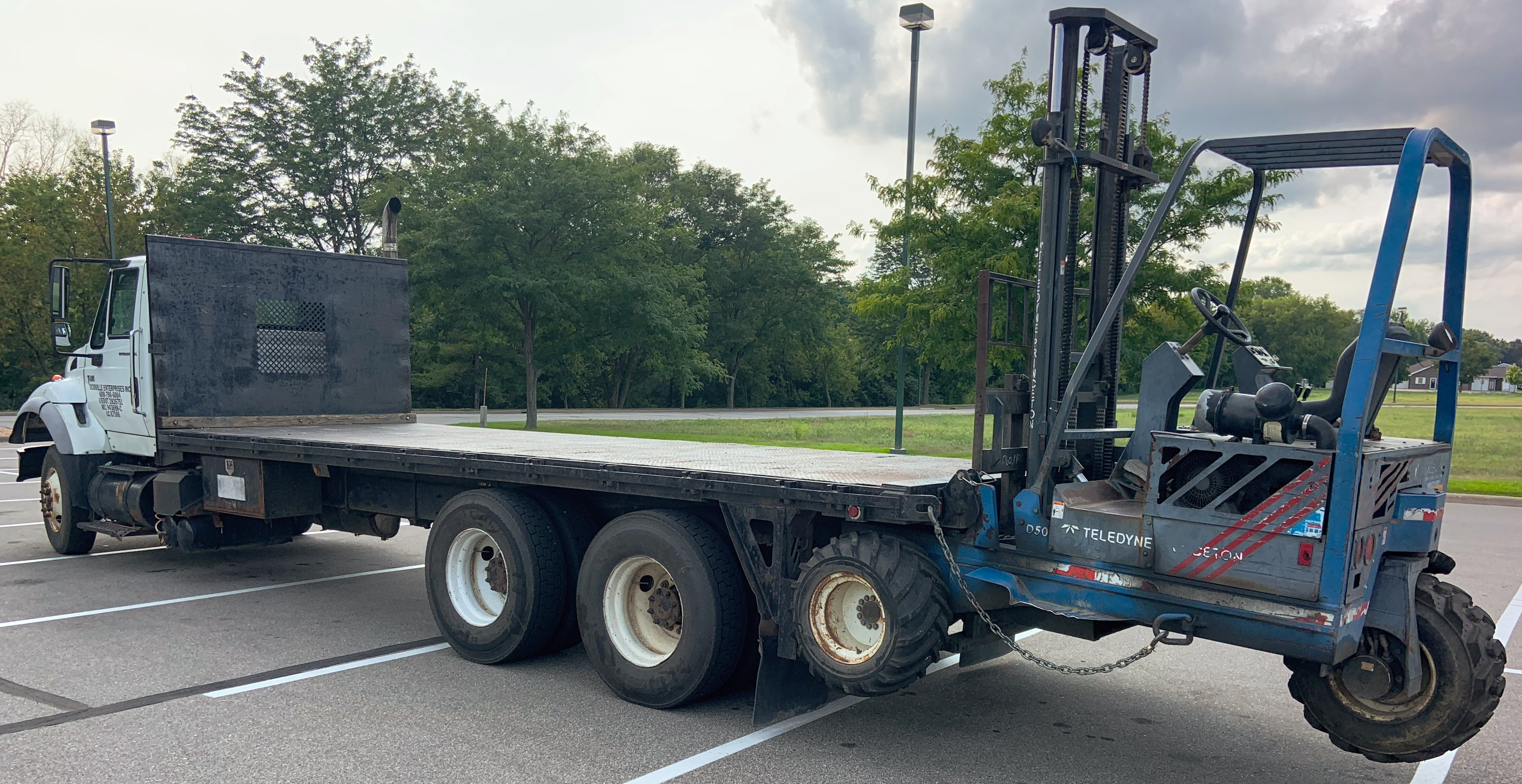
Moffett forklift on flatbed truck

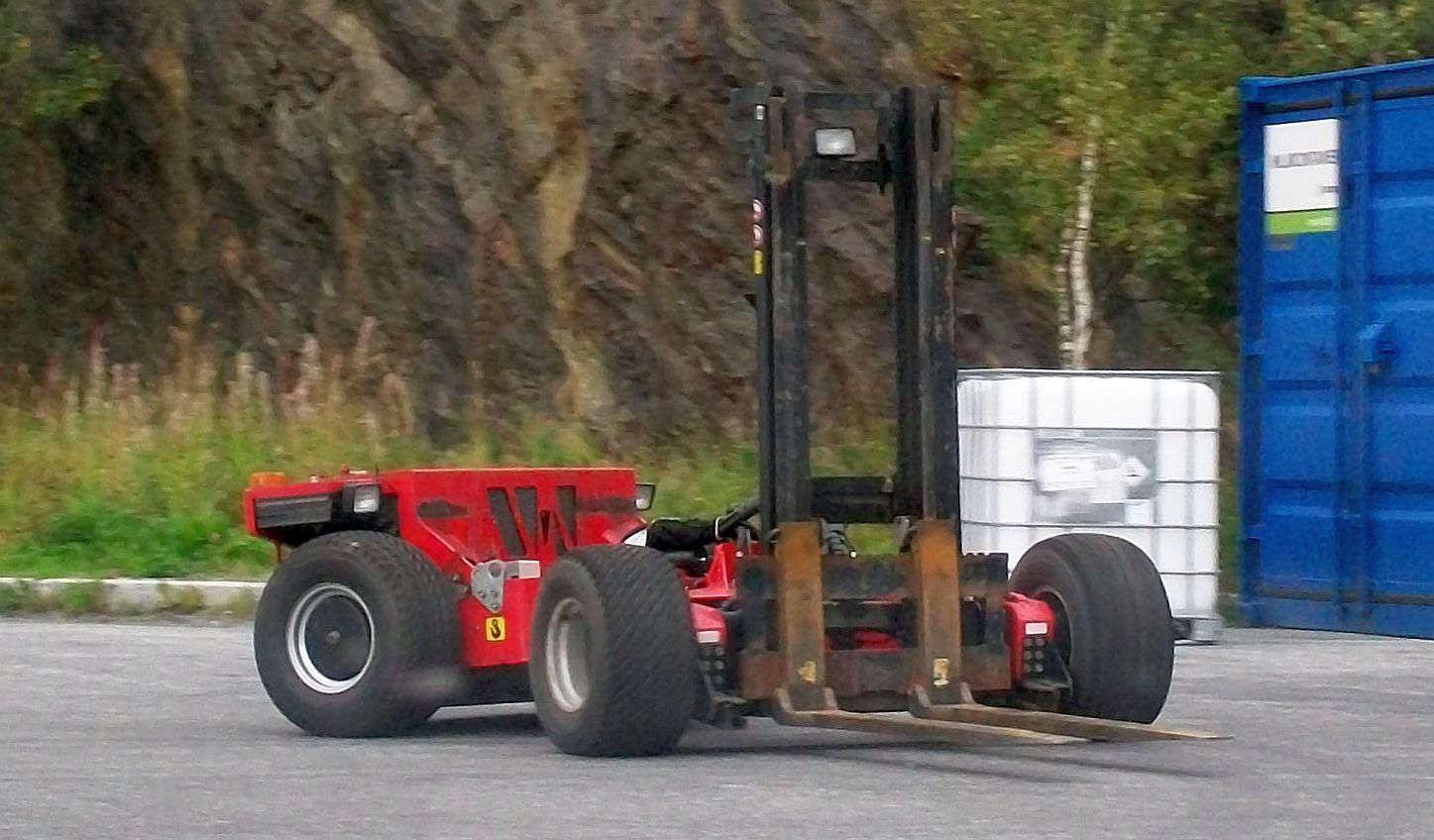
A walk-along version

Also referred to as a sod loader. Comes in sit-down center control. Usually has an internal combustion engine. Engines are almost always diesel, but sometimes operate on kerosene, and sometimes use propane injection as a power boost. Some old units are two-stroke compression ignition; most are four-stroke compression ignition. North American engines come with advanced emission control systems. Forklifts built in countries such as Iran or Russia will typically have no emission control systems.

== Specialized trucks ==
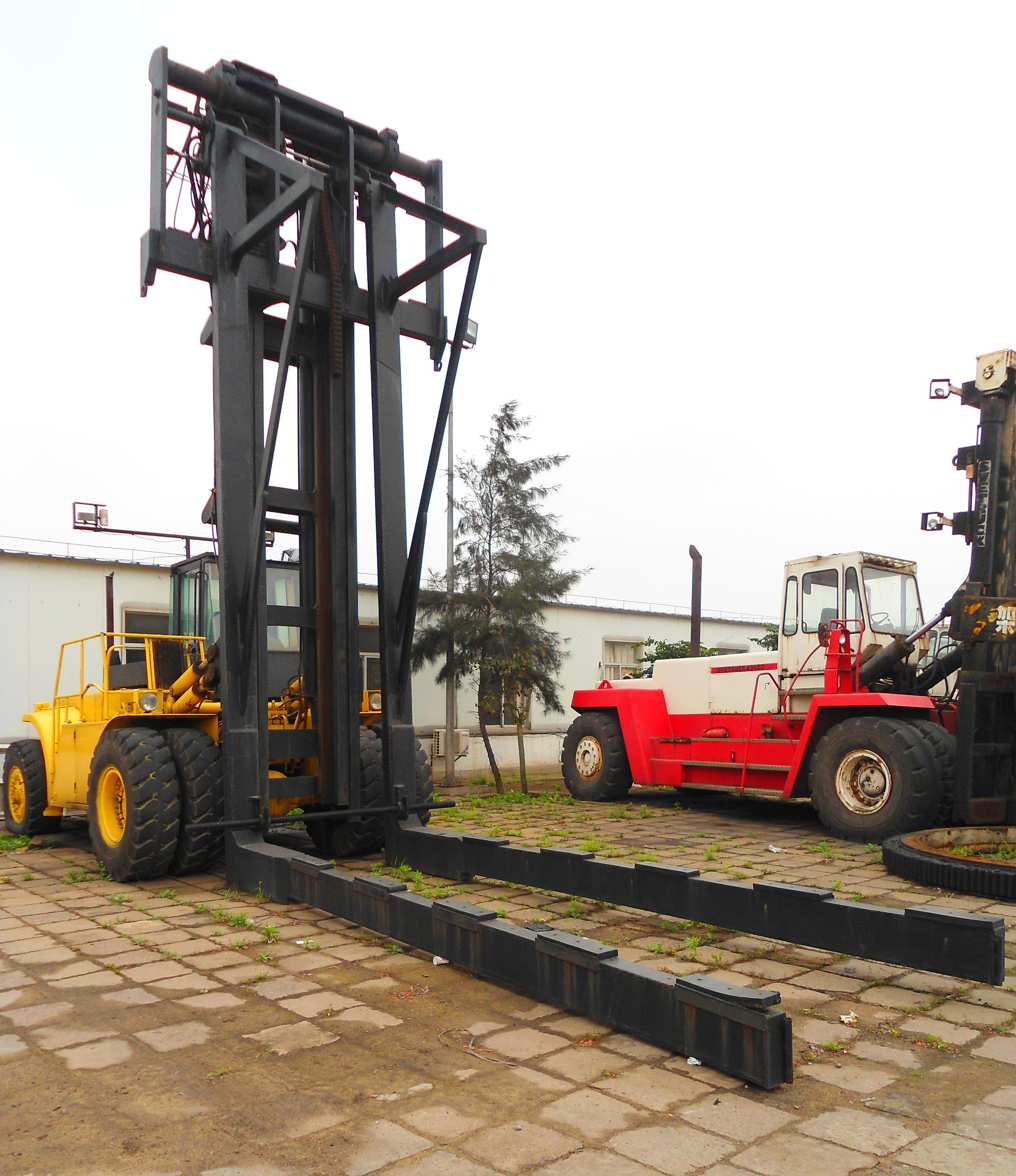
A straight mast container handler at Haikou Xiuying Port, Hainan, China

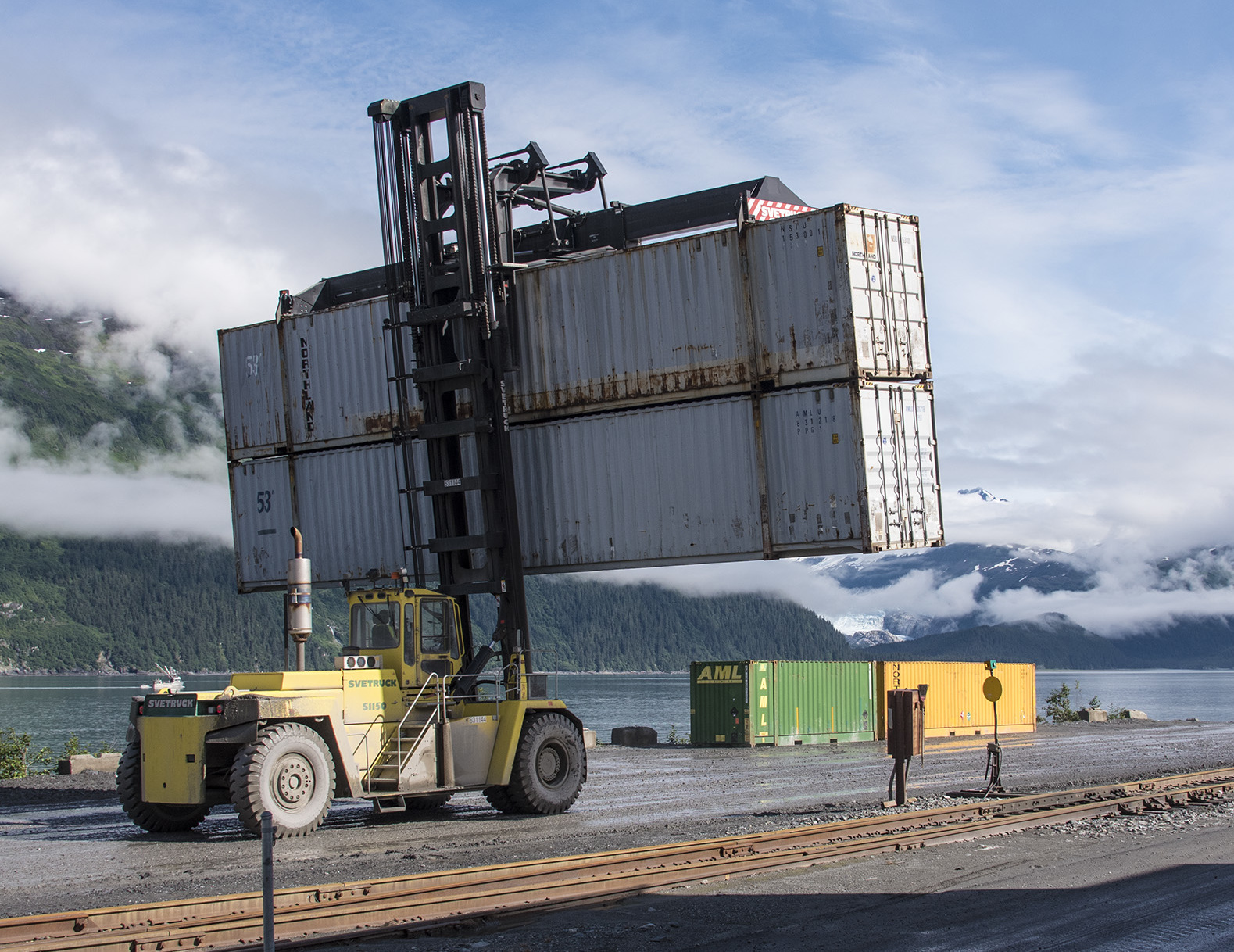
Container handler moving two empty 53-foot boxes by their 40-foot posts

At the other end of the spectrum from the counterbalanced forklift trucks are more 'high-end' specialty trucks.

=== Articulated counterbalance trucks ===
Articulating counterbalance trucks are designed to be both able to offload trailers and place the load in narrow aisle racking. The central pivot of the truck allows loads to be stored in racking at a right angle to the truck, reducing space requirements (therefore increasing pallet storage density) and eliminating double handling from yard to warehouse.

Frederick L Brown is credited with perfecting the principle of an articulated design in about 1982, receiving an award in 2002 from the UK's Fork Lift Truck Association for Services to the Forklift Industry and the Queen's Award for Innovation in 2003. He took inspiration from the hand pallet truck and found that by reversing the triangle of stability and changing the weight distribution he could solve the issues that had long eluded earlier attempts of articulating a forklift truck. Freddy's patent application referenced specific drive methods, allowing competitors to enter the market by offering alternative methods, but using the same articulating principle.

=== Guided very narrow aisle trucks ===
These are rail- or wire-guided and available with lift heights up to 40 feet (12 m) non-top-tied and 98 feet (30 m) top-tied. Two forms are available: 'man-down' and 'man-riser', where the operator elevates with the load for increased visibility or for multilevel 'break bulk' order picking. This type of truck, unlike articulated narrow-aisle trucks, requires a high standard of floor flatness.

=== Marina forklifts ===
These lifts are found in places like marinas and boat storage facilities. Featuring tall masts, heavy counterweights, and special paint to resist seawater-induced corrosion, they are used to lift boats in and out of storage racks. Once out, the forklift can place the boat into the water, as well as remove it when the boating activity is finished. Marina forklifts are unique among most other forklifts in that they feature a "negative lift" cylinder. This type of cylinder allows the forks to actually descend lower than ground level. Such functionality is necessary, given that the ground upon which the forklift operates is higher than the water level below. Additionally, marina forklifts feature some of the longest forks available, with some up to 24 feet long. The forks are also typically coated in rubber to prevent damage to the hull of the boats that rest on them.

=== Omnidirectional trucks ===
Omnidirectional technology (such as Mecanum wheels) can allow a forklift truck to move forward, diagonally and laterally, or in any direction on a surface. An omnidirectional wheel system is able to strafe sideways without turning the truck cabin and allow for more forklifts to be able to rotate 360 degrees within its own footprint.

=== UL 558 safety-rated trucks ===
In North America, some internal combustion-powered industrial vehicles carry Underwriters Laboratories ratings that are part of UL 558. Industrial trucks that are considered "safety" carry the designations GS (Gasoline Safety) for gasoline-powered, DS (Diesel Safety) for diesel-powered, LPS (Liquid Propane Safety) for liquified propane or GS/LPS for a dual fuel gasoline/liquified propane-powered truck.

UL 558 is a two-stage safety standard. The basic standards are referred to as G, D, LP, and G/LP. They are considered by Underwriters Laboratories to be the bare minimum required for a lift truck. This is a voluntary standard, and there is no requirement in North America at least by any Government Agency for manufacturers to meet this standard.

The slightly more stringent safety standards GS, DS, LPS, and GP/LPS do provide some minimal protection; however, it is extremely minimal. In the past, Underwriter's Laboratory offered specialty EX and DX safety certifications.

=== UL 583 safety-rated trucks ===
UL 583 is the Electric equivalent of UL 558. As with UL 558 it is a two-stage standard.

=== Explosion-proof trucks ===
These are for operation in potentially explosive atmospheres found in chemical, petrochemical, pharmaceutical, food and drink, logistics or other fields handling flammable material. Commonly referred to as mainly Miretti or sometimes Pyroban trucks in Europe, they must meet the requirements of the ATEX 94/9/EC Directive if used in Zone 1, 2, 21 or 22 areas and be maintained accordingly.

== Automated forklift trucks ==
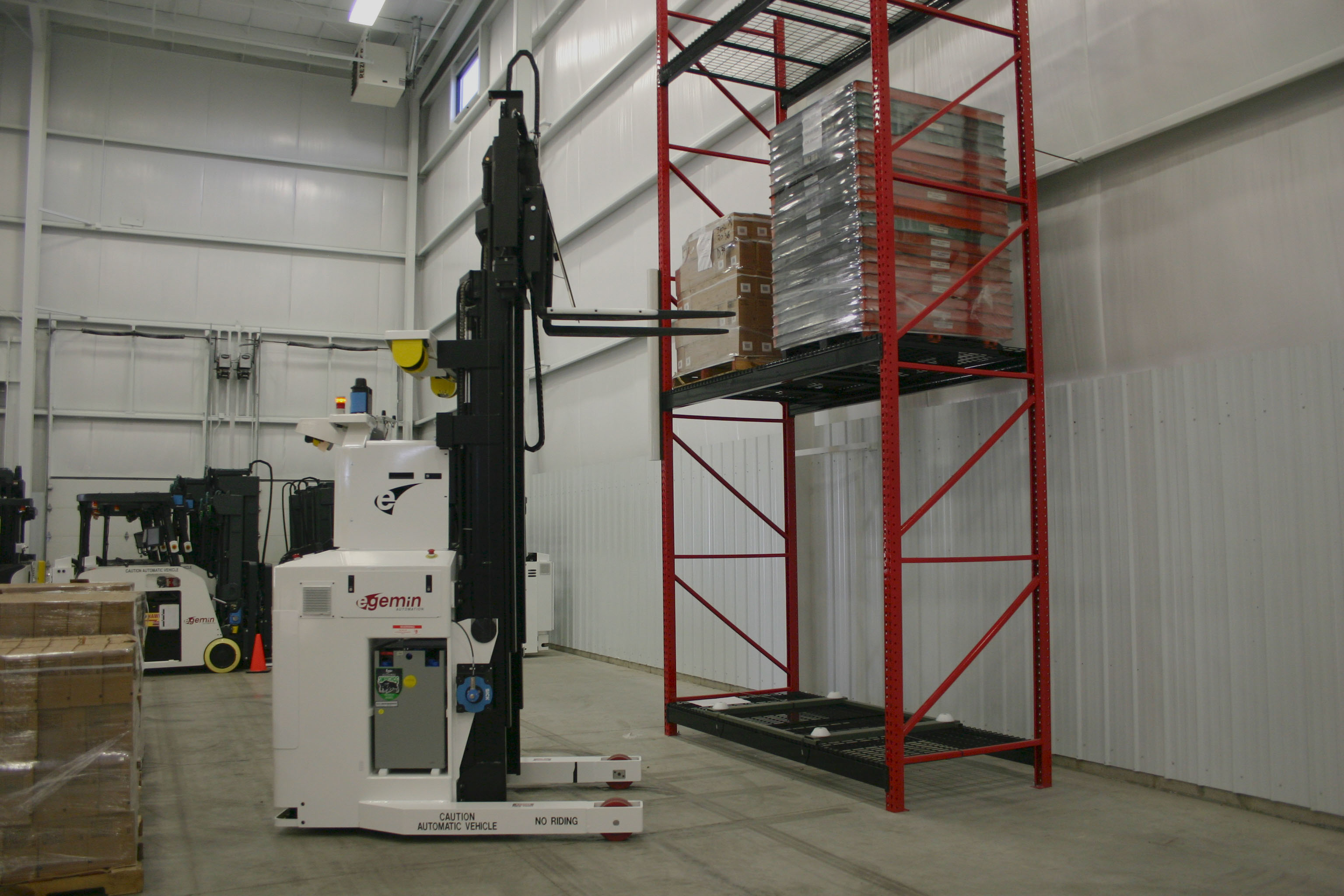
Autonomous forklift

In order to decrease work wages, reduce operational cost and improve productivity, automated forklifts have also been developed. Automated forklifts are also called forked automated guided vehicles and are already available for sale.

== Safety ==
In the United States, approximately 7,500 workers annually are reported injured in forklift-related incidents, while nearly 100 are killed. A common hazard in manufacturing environments is forklifts striking pedestrian workers. Forklift accidents that involve being caught in objects during loading or unloading and collisions during driving had the highest risk of injury, especially complex lower extremity injuries with a relatively high occurrence of complications.

Beyond incidents, regular forklift driving involves day-to-day demands on the body, such as postures adopted by the operators to overcome field of vision obstructions, intense mental fatigue, and excessive whole body vibrations. This can increase the risk of long-term issues including chronic pain and musculoskeletal disorders. Health care providers recommend that workers who drive or use heavy equipment such as forklifts do not treat chronic or acute pain with opioids.

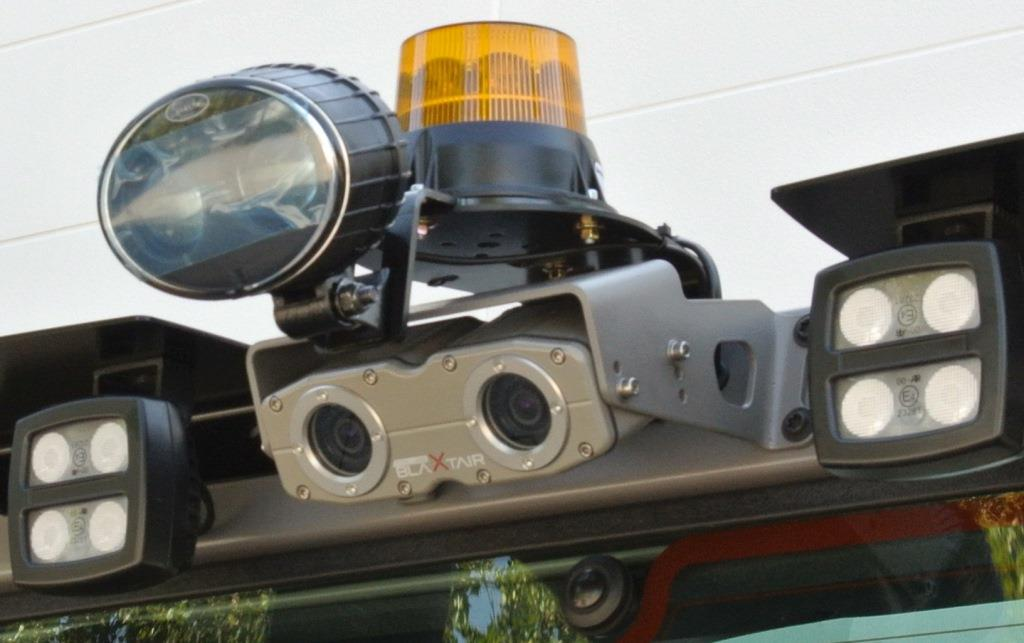
A pedestrian detection system

Forklift safety features include high-visibility seat belts, lighting to warns pedestrians that a forklift is coming and sensors that slow the vehicle to prevent collisions. Sensors can be used to detect pedestrians, objects, or both in a driver's blind spots. Pedestrian detection systems are proximity sensors that detect objects and pedestrians from up to several meters away from the forklift. Ultrasonic sensors are proximity sensors typically used in the rear of the forklift. They do not discriminate between people and objects. RF systems alert forklift drivers of pedestrians carrying a radio frequency device in the forklift's vicinity. RF systems can differentiate between people and the usual obstacles found in warehouses.

== Legislation ==
Road sign in Czechia

Forklift safety is subject to a variety of standards from governments and professional organizations. These professional organizations include the Industrial Truck Standards Development Foundation (ITSDF), National Fire Protection Association (NFPA), and International Organization for Standardization (ISO).

In the United States, workplace forklift training is governed federally by the Occupational Safety and Health Administration (OSHA). In 1999, OSHA updated its regulations governing forklifts ("powered industrial trucks"), adding explicit requirements for employer training programs. Employers must certify that each operator has been trained and evaluated, and must evaluate each operator at least once every three years. In the UK, the Provision and Use of Work Equipment Regulations state that operators of forklift trucks must be adequately trained. Third-party organisations have also developed de facto 'best practice' standards for forklift training, commonly referred to in the UK as a 'forklift licence.' Qualified forklift instructors must be registered with at least one of the voluntary training organisations. In Australia, as of the 2011 health and safety harmonization agreement, forklift licences are classed as "high-risk work licences" and are issued by individual states and territories, while still governed by a federal framework. To obtain a forklift licence an applicant must complete a training course with an approved training organisation. In New Zealand, forklift operator training is divided into operator's certificates and forklift (F) driver license endorsements. The operator's certificate gives permission for operators to drive a forklift in a private space. To use a forklift on a public road, the operator must obtain a forklift (F) endorsement on their driver licence. Operators with a class 1 (car) licence and an F endorsement may only operate forklifts up to 18,000 kg (40,000 lb) gross laden weight, while those holding a class 2 (medium rigid) licence and an F endorsement can operate a forklift of any gross laden weight.

== Associations and organizations ==
There are many national as well as continental associations related to the industrial truck sector. Some of the major organizations include:

- Industrial Truck Association (ITA) (North America)
- Material Handling Equipment Distributors Association (MHEDA) (North America)
- European Materials Handling Federation (FEM)
- UK Material Handling Association (UKMHA) www.ukmha.org.uk
- Japan Industrial Vehicles Association (JIVA)
- Korean Construction Equipment Manufacturers Association (KOCEMA)

There are many significant contacts among these organizations and they have established joint statistical and engineering programs. One program is the World Industrial Trucks Statistics (WITS) which is published every month to the association memberships. The statistics are separated by area (continent), country and class of machine. While the statistics are generic and do not count production from most of the smaller manufacturers, the information is significant for its depth. These contacts have brought to a common definition of a Class System to which all the major manufacturers adhere.

== See also ==
- Electrocar
- Forklift Driver Klaus – The First Day on the Job
- Hydrogen vehicle – Vehicle that uses hydrogen fuel for motive power
- Non-road engine – Internal combustion engine classification
- Pallet jack – Industrial machine
- Pallet – Flat structure to transport goods
- Slip sheet – Unit load handling aid using sheet
- Telescopic handler – Industrial machine
- Industrial transfer cart – Small industrial vehicle
