= Marine terminal =

The term Marine terminal may apply to:

- a berth (moorings)
- a dock (maritime)
- a ferry slip
- a ferry terminal
- a port
- a wharf

== See also ==
- Terminal (disambiguation)
