= Gunnebo Group =

Swedish security company

Gunnebo AB (publ)
- Industry: Security
- Headquarters: Gothenburg, Sweden
- Area served: Worldwide
- Key people: Stefan Syrén (President & CEO)
- Products: Entrance control Safe storage
- Revenue: 421.6 millions $ (2025)
- Number of employees: 3,622 (2026)

Gunnebo is a multinational corporation headquartered in Gothenburg, Sweden, specializing in security products mainly in the areas of entrance control and safe storage.

The Gunnebo Group has operations in 25 countries with approximately 3,400 employees and a reported global revenue of MEUR 418 for 2021.

== History ==
=== Origins ===
Gunnebo has its roots in the village of Gunnebo in south-east Sweden, where Hans Hultman created a forge in 1764. This small business grew steadily until the formation of Gunnebo Bruks Nya AB in 1889. This company later became known as Gunnebo Industries.

=== Becoming a listed company ===
In 1991 HIDEF Kapital AB was formed by the Swedish government as one of eight venture capital companies charged with investing in Swedish companies suffering from the national financial crisis. HIDEF became a listed company on the Swedish Stock Exchange in 1994 and one year later took the name of one of its acquisitions, Gunnebo Industries, to become Gunnebo AB (aktiebolag).

=== Expansion through acquisitions ===
At this point Gunnebo began a series of major acquisitions and bought several companies focused on security from sectors such as safes & vaults, cash management, entrance security and electronic security (see section below).

In 2005, Gunnebo Industries and its traditional fencing business was divested from Gunnebo AB.

In 2006, the 30 or so acquisitions made between 1994 and 2004 were brought fully under the umbrella of Gunnebo to create sales companies in 29 different markets around the globe. As the Group developed in growth markets, these were added to through the creation of Gunnebo China (2010), Gunnebo Brazil (2011), Gunnebo Malaysia (2011) and Gunnebo South Korea (2013).

== Brands ==
The Gunnebo Group owns several major brands within the field of security.

Brand	Product	Market	Origin
Chubbsafes	Safe storage	Global	UK. Founded 1818.
Hamilton	Safe storage	North America	USA. Founded 1967.
Rosengrens	Safe storage	Global	Sweden. Founded 1886.
Steelage	Safe storage	India	India. Founded 1932.
Minimax	Fire safety	India	India. Founded 1903.
elkosta	Outdoor perimeter security	Global	Germany. Founded 1951.

== Major acquisitions ==
Major Acquisitions	Year	Country
Gnosjö Group	1994	Sweden
Rosengrens	1994	Sweden
Presso Industrier AB	1994	Sweden
Gunnebo Industrier	1995	Sweden
Italdis	1997	Italy
Wego	1997	Germany
Carl Seifert	1997	Denmark
Praediator	1998	Poland
Hygiaphone	1998	France
Garny	1998	Germany
Polaraidat	1998	Finland
Fichet-Bauche	1999	France
Rosengrens Austria	1999	Austria
T Kern	1999	Switzerland
Chubbsafes	2000	UK
Clausen	2001	Norway and Sweden
CS Security (Ritzenthaler/Haffner)	2001	France
Nurmi Trade	2001	Finland
Omega	2001	US
Leicher	2002	Germany
Riva	2002	Italy
Kubon	2003	Germany
Securibel	2004	Switzerland
Elkosta	2004	Germany
Lips Vago	2004	Italy
Chubb	2004	Belgium
Hammer Sicherheit	2004	Belgium
Gateway Security	2004	Sweden
Eurofence	2004	France
Aysec	2004	Finland
Grand Entrance Control	2008	Australia
API Security/Physical Security Division	2010	Australia
Alltech	2011	South Africa
Gateway do Brazil (80%)	2011	Brazil
Hamilton	2012	USA
ATG Entrance Corporation	2013	South Korea
DISSAMEX	2014	México
Clear Image	2014	UK
Grupo Sallén Tech S.L.	2015	Spain
Cominfo, a.s.	2019	Czechia
HC2	2021	Italy

== Products ==
=== Safe storage ===
Includes safes, safe deposit lockers and strongrooms. To determine the level of security provided by a safe or vault, there is a grading system from I-XII. A grade is always awarded by an independent body (European Certification Body). Safes with grades up to III are typically used by retailers or in offices, whereas banks tend to use safes and vaults with much higher grades.

Safes can also be constructed to withstand fire and therefore can also carry a fire protection grade. This denotes the type of contents which can be protected (either paper or data media) and the duration of protection (half an hour, one hour or two hours).

=== Entrance control ===
Entrance control products include speed gates, turnstiles and other entrance systems which only allow entry to authorised individuals. These are used, for example, in mass transit public transport systems or at stadia to allow passage to only those people carrying a valid ticket. Entrance control is also used in airports to facilitate boarding and immigration control, and to prevent passengers returning from public-side to airside.
