= Chubbsafes =

Brand of safes and vaults

- Product type: Safes and vaults
- Current owner: Gunnebo Group
- Country: England
- Markets: Global
- Website: chubbsafes.com

Chubbsafes is a brand of safes and vaults with its origins in the UK. It specialises in products which offer certified burglary protection and/or fire protection.

The brand is widely sold and marketed in the UK, South Africa, India and Malaysia as well as parts of northern Europe and east Asia.

Chubbsafes is owned under licence by the Gunnebo Group.

== History ==
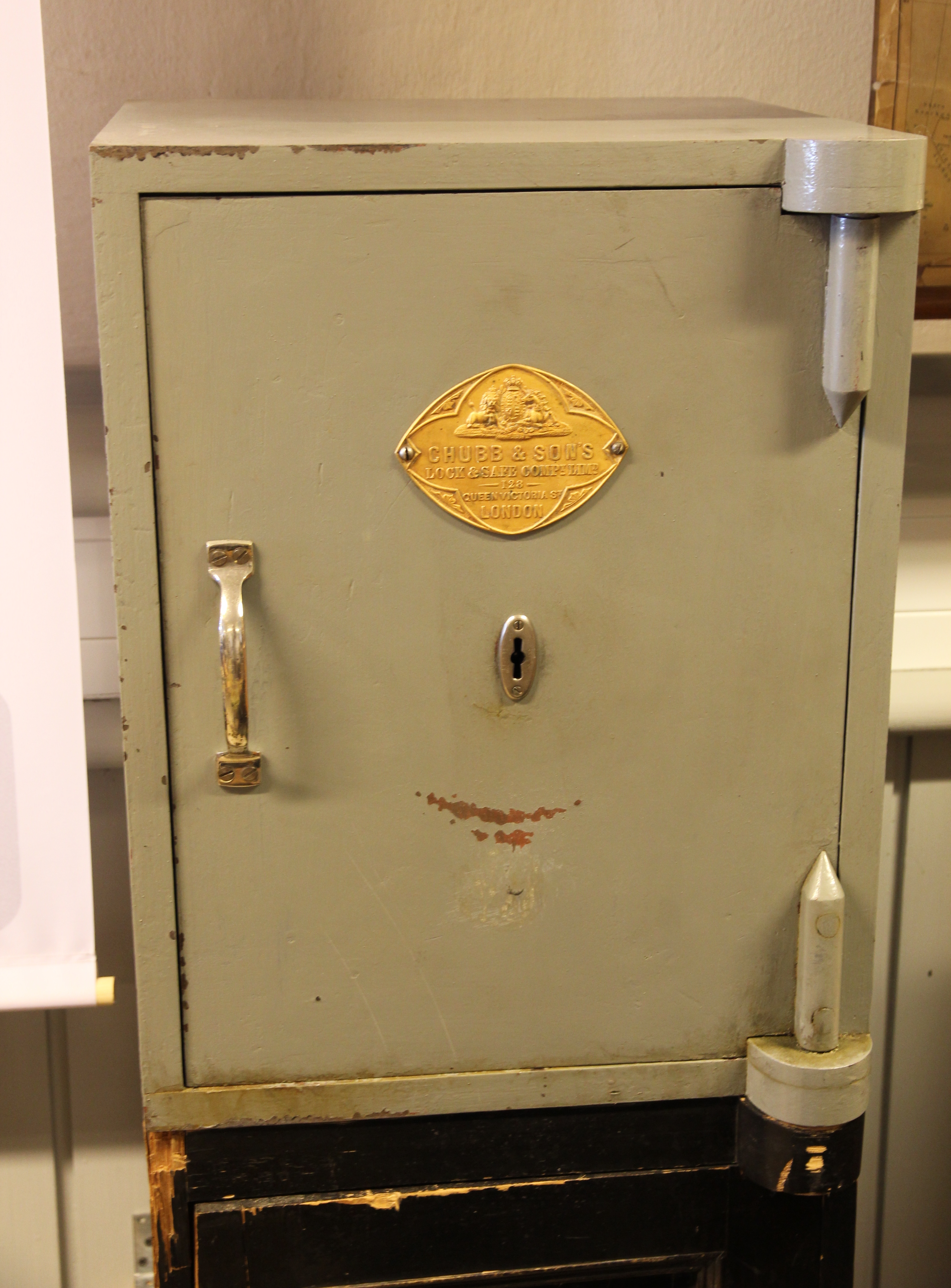
Example of a Chubb safe

=== Early years: 1818–1938 ===
In 1818, Charles Chubb and his younger brother, Jeremiah Chubb, founded the Chubb Company and opened a workshop for making locks on Temple Street in Wolverhampton, England. Two years later, they opened a shop at 57 St.Paul's Churchyard in London.

In 1835, Charles Chubb expanded the business and took out a patent for a burglary-resistant safe. A safe works was opened shortly afterwards, in 1837, in London and in 1839 the brothers patented their first fire safe.

Following the death of Charles, the company remained in the family, being taken over by his son, John Chubb, in 1846, and then his grandchildren, John Charles, George Hayter and Harry Withers Chubb in 1872.

In 1882, the business became a private limited company and changed its name to Chubb & Son's Lock and Safe Company Ltd.

The London safe works moved to Wednesfield Road in Wolverhampton in 1908, and when the site was extended in 1938, it was joined by the lock works.

=== Expansion: 1950s–1990s ===
On 31 January 1950 a celebratory dinner was held at the Carlton Hotel in Johannesburg South Africa. The event was the inauguration of Mr F.M.W Petersen Director Austen Petersen Safe Company of South Africa with Chubb & Sons Lock and Safe Company of Great Britain.

The first overseas factory opened in South Africa in 1950 which was followed by a second offshore plant, this time in Canada, four years later.

Over the coming years, the Chubb Company made several acquisitions and was later acquired itself. Hobbs Hart & Co Ltd became a member of the Chubb Group in 1956, Chatwood-Milner Ltd in 1958 and Josiah Parkes & Sons (Holdings) Limited in 1965.

The Racal Electronics Group then acquired Chubb & Sons Lock and Safe Company in 1984 and before US company, Williams Holdings, took it over in 1997.

=== 21st century ===
In 2000, the safes part of the company and a licence for the Chubbsafes brand was acquired by the Gunnebo Group. Since then, Chubbsafes has been introduced to new markets including China, Indonesia, Sweden, Germany and France.

== Products ==
=== Safes ===
Safes are sold from Grade I to Grade VI, rising in the level of physical attack the safe will withstand. A grade is always awarded by an independent body (European Certification Body).

=== Fire Safes ===
Safes are also sold which withstand fire. These are independently certified for the length of protection (half an hour, one hour or two hours) and the type of contents which will be protected (either paper or data). The range includes document safes, data safes and fireproof filing cabinets.

=== Vault Rooms ===
With grades up to XII, vault rooms and vault doors are used not only by banks, but also companies which need to protect the contents of a specific area, such as a weapons room or storage of pharmaceuticals.
