= Rosengrens =

- Product type: safes and vaults
- Current owner: Gunnebo Security Group
- Country: Sweden
- Markets: Global
- Website: Rosengrens

Rosengrens is a brand of safes and vaults from Sweden. It specialises in products which offer certified burglary protection and/or fire protection. The brand is widely sold in Scandinavia, Germany, Poland and Switzerland, as well as other parts of central and eastern Europe. Rosengrens is owned by the Gunnebo Security Group.

== History ==
In 1886, the twenty-year-old Edvin Albert Rosengren took over a blacksmiths in Gothenburg, Sweden, where he had been working as an apprentice. Initially producing a limited range of light safes, Rosengren quickly grew the business, expanding it to produce heavier safes, safe deposit lockers and vault doors for banks.

In 1897, Rosengren won a gold medal at the Stockholm Exhibition for Art and Industry for a large decorative safe. Two such safes were built, one of which is housed today at the headquarters of the Gunnebo Security Group. As the company expanded, it opened its first production plant in the Backa area of Gothenburg in 1905. Over the next three years, turnover increased sixfold.

Rosengren died in 1910 at the age of 44. Shortly after his death, the company was listed on the stock exchange. The company continued to prosper, and introduced electronically controlled safe deposit lockers in the 1970s. During the 1980s, a number of companies were acquired by Rosengrens, including Euro-Si A/S in Maribo (Denmark), Tann AB in Gävle (Sweden), Hadak Security AB in Eskilstuna and Mora (Sweden) and Koninklijke Martens Safes BV (Netherlands). In 1994, Rosengrens was acquired by the Gunnebo Security Group. Today it is one of several brands of safes and vaults sold and marketed by the security company.

== Products ==
=== Safes ===
Safes are sold from Grade I to Grade VI, rising in the level of physical attack the safe will withstand. The grade is always awarded by an independent body (European Certification Body).

=== Fire safes ===
Safes are also sold which withstand fire. These are independently certified for the length of protection (half an hour, one hour or two hours) and the type of contents which will be protected (either paper or data). The range includes document safes, data safes and fireproof filing cabinets.

=== Vault rooms ===
With grades up to XII, vault rooms and vault doors are used by banks and other companies which need to protect the contents of a specific area, such as a weapons room or storage of pharmaceuticals.
