= United States government safe and vault door specifications =

General Services Administration-approved safes and vaults are certified high-security safes and vault doors for military and embassy applications. Each vault door under this specification meets stringent criteria and has passed the qualification tests and inspections performed at a Government test facility for the General Services Administration.

== Requirements ==
The protection levels certified above applies only to the door and not to the vault proper.

=== Class 5-V ===
A United States Government Class 5-V vault door, which has been tested and approved by the Government under Fed. Spec. AA-D-600D, affords the following security protection:

- 20 man-hours against surreptitious entry.
- 30 man-minutes against covert entry.
- 10 man-minutes against forced entry.

=== Class 5-A ===
A United States Government Class 5-A vault door, which has been tested and approved by the Government under Fed. Spec. AA-D-600D, affords the following security protection:

- 30 man-minutes against covert entry.
- 10 man-minutes against forced entry.

=== Class 5-B ===
A United States Government Class 5-B vault door, which has been tested and approved by the Government under Fed. Spec. AA-D-600D, is ballistic resistant and affords the following security protection:

- 20 man-hours against surreptitious entry.
- 30 man-minutes against covert entry.
- 10 man-minutes against forced entry.
