= Time-delay combination locks =

Type of electronic lock

A time-delay combination lock is most commonly a digital, electronic combination lock equipped with a delay timer that delays the unlocking of the lock by a user-definable delay period, usually less than one hour. Unlike the time lock, which unlocks at a preset time (as in the case of a bank vault), time-delay locks operate each time the safe is unlocked, but the operator must wait for the set delay period to elapse before the lock can be opened. Time delay safes are most commonly used in businesses with high cash transactions. They are used in some banks in the UK including Nationwide, HSBC, Barclays, and Halifax.

Time-delayed safes are also used by pharmacies to deter robberies by securing narcotic drugs, particularly prescription Oxycodone. The implementation of these safes has significantly reduced pharmacy robberies.

== Use ==
Time-delay combination locks are frequently incorporated into money safes as an armed robbery deterrent. In many instances, time-delay combination locks are also equipped with a duress code which may be entered to activate the time delay whilst sending a silent alarm to a monitoring centre.

Modern time delay combination locks can have many functions such as multiple different codes, pre-set time lock settings (open and close times), pre-set vacation times (e.g. Christmas Day), dual code facility, and a full audit trail providing a detailed record of the lock history showing who opened the lock, when and how long it was open.

They also use a non-volatile memory so that no information is lost if the batteries are depleted. This will allow the safe to be opened when the batteries are changed after the pre-set time if the correct code is entered. Some electronic combination locks with a time-delay feature require the code to be entered twice: once to start the timer, and a second to unlock and open the safe entered after the delay period has expired.
