= Thermal lance =

Thermal tool that cuts dense heavy materials

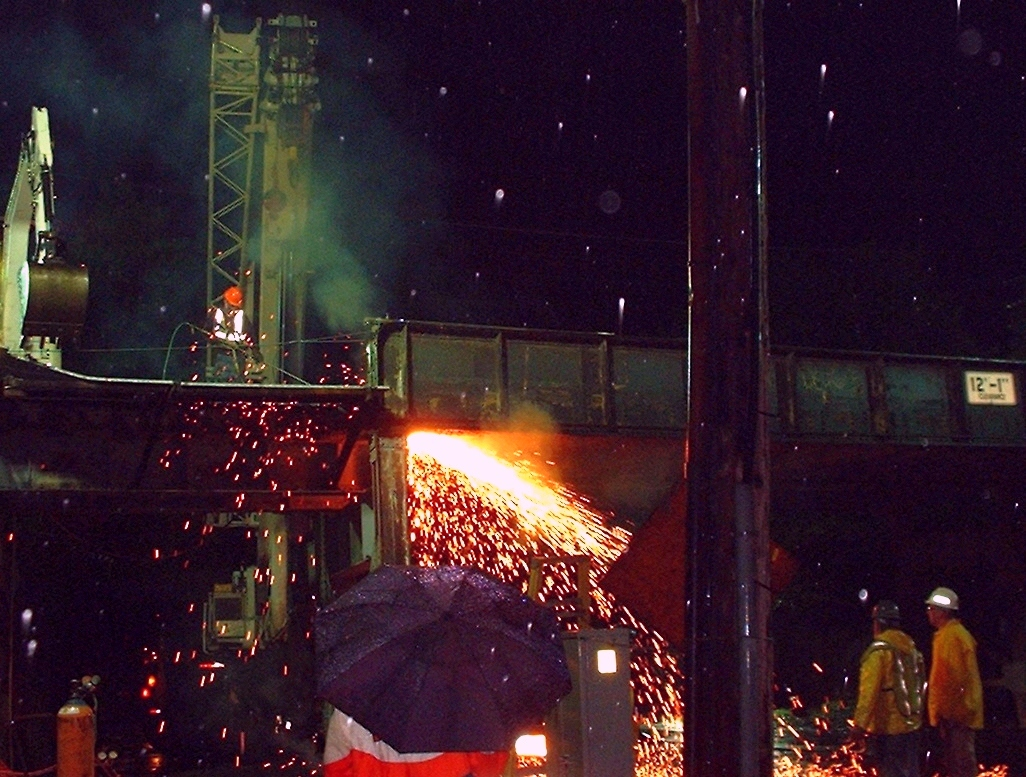
- Thermal lance cutting a railroad bridge to prepare for replacement
- Other names: thermic lance; oxygen lance; burning bar
- Uses: cutting, heavy demolition

A thermal lance, thermic lance, oxygen lance, or burning bar is a tool that heats and melts steel in the presence of pressurized oxygen to create very high temperatures for cutting. It consists of a long steel tube packed with alloy steel rods, which serve as fuel; these are sometimes mixed with aluminum rods to increase the heat output.

== Operation ==
Simplified principle and graph of temperature (T) vs distance from the reacting tip (d) of a thermal lance

One end of the tube is placed in a holder and oxygen is fed through the tube. The far end of the tube is pre-heated and lit by an oxyacetylene torch. An intense stream of burning steel is produced at the working end and can be used to cut rapidly through thick materials, including steel and concrete. The tube is consumed by the process within a few minutes.

=== Applications ===
Often used as a heavy duty demolition tool, the thermic lance is also used to remove seized axles of heavy machinery without damaging the bearings or axle housing. This technique is often used on the pins and axles of large equipment such as cranes, ships, bridges, and sluice-gates. In addition, thermal lancing is used to clean the bottom of steel furnace pots, which accumulate a skull layer of slag and iron during operation.

=== Principle of operation ===
Steel, in the form of steel wool, can burn at atmospheric (20%) concentrations of oxygen because it has a high surface area-to-mass ratio and relatively low mass, which prevents the heat from being dissipated in the bulk of the material. When the oxygen concentration is increased, steel wool will burn faster. Burning steel wool is simply the rapid oxidation of iron into Fe_{2}O_{3}; the thermal lance uses steel in the form of rods rather than wool, the rods will burn with a sufficiently high supply of concentrated oxygen.

The temperature at which a thermal lance operates varies depending on the environment. Some estimates put the maximum temperature at 4,500 °C (8,130 °F), while others calculate it to be 2,730 °C (4,950 °F).

=== Alternative fuels ===
Thermal lances have been constructed for demonstration using foodstuffs (including bacon, dried spaghetti and Takis) as the fuel instead of steel rods; a supply of pure oxygen is more important to drive rapid oxidation than the fuel being burned.

== History ==
Leo Malcher filed for a patent in 1922 entitled "Process of attacking compact mineral material, noncombustible in oxygen". The patent uses "a suitable disintegrating flux to act upon the material at the point where it is desired to attack it ... the fuel employed in the example to be described is metallic iron, and is arranged in the form of two concentric pipes". The annulus between the two pipes was filled with a flux (sodium carbonate, borax, and sodium chloride in equal proportions) and oxygen was supplied through the inner tube.

== See also ==
- Thermite – Pyrotechnic composition of metal powder and metal oxide
