= Safe =

Secure lockable box used for securing valuable objects

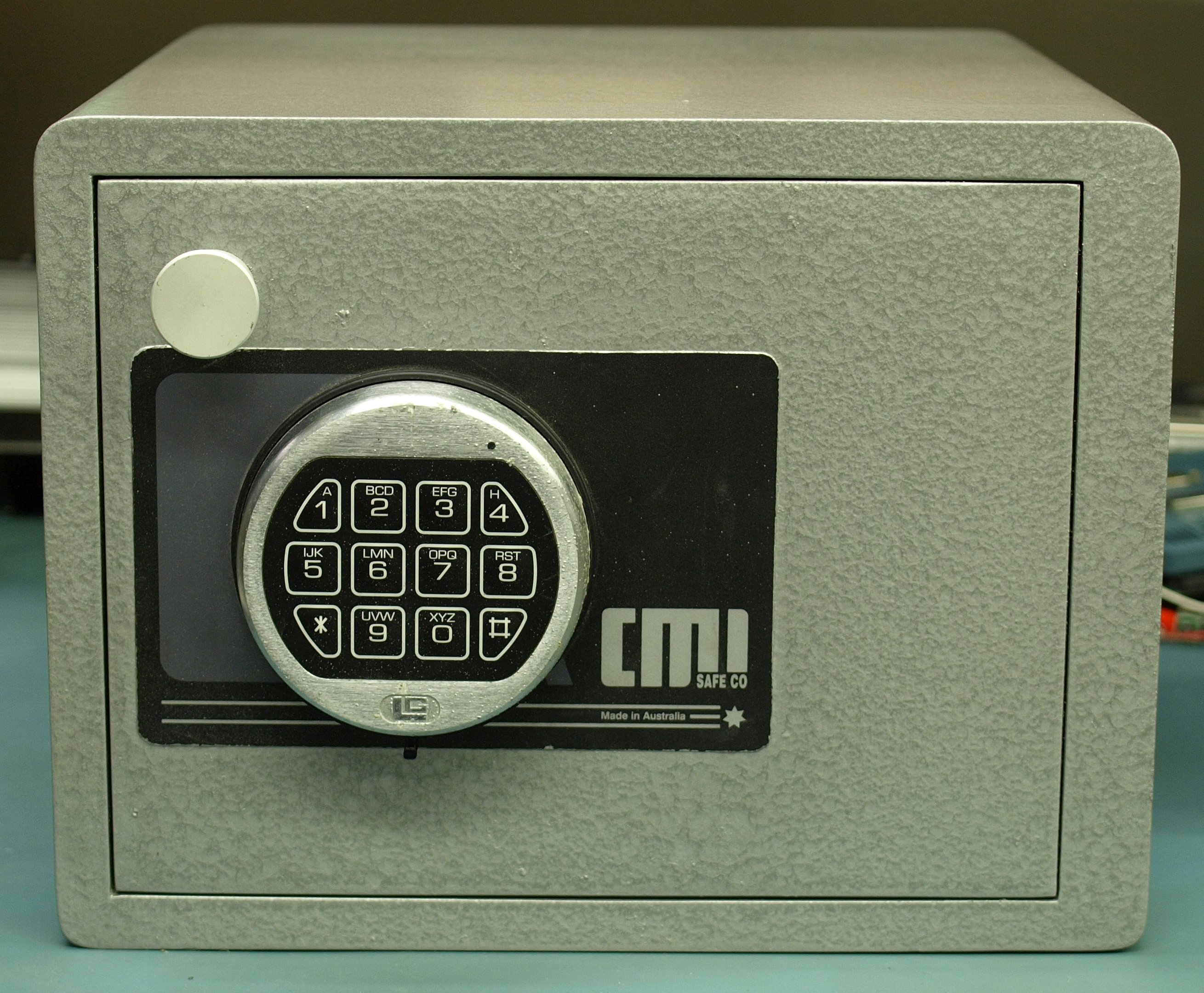
Basic steel safe with an electronic lock.

A safe (also called a strongbox or coffer) is a secure, lockable enclosure that protects objects against theft or fire. A safe is usually a hollow cuboid or cylinder, with one face being removable or hinged to form a door. The body and door may be cast from metal (such as steel) or formed out of plastic through blow molding. Bank teller safes are typically secured to the counter, have a slit opening for dropping valuables into the safe without opening it, and a time-delay combination lock to foil thieves. One key distinction between safe types is whether the safe is secured to a wall or structure or can be moved around.

== History ==
The first known safe dates back to the 13th century BC and was found in the tomb of Pharaoh Ramesses II. It was made of wood and consisted of a locking system resembling the modern pin tumbler lock.

In the 16th century, blacksmiths in southern Germany, Austria, and France first forged cash boxes in sheet iron. These sheet-iron money chests served as the models for mass-produced cash boxes in the 19th century.

In the 17th century, in northern Europe, iron safes were sometimes made in the shape of a barrel, with a padlock on top.

Brothers Charles and Jeremiah Chubb founded a lock company in 1818 and established a purpose-built factory in Wolverhampton. The company began manufacturing burglar-resistant safes in 1835 and opened its first dedicated safe works in London two years later.

During the 19th century, safe design increasingly treated fire resistance as a separate engineering problem. An 1849 United States patent by Edward and Joseph L. Hall described a double-walled chest filled with a continuous layer of cement; the inventors sought to reduce heat transfer by avoiding metal rivets that bridged the inner and outer casings. An 1867 patent proposed sealed water vessels within the safe walls: heat would melt a fusible seal and release steam into the chamber. In 1884, Max Mosler patented a design that surrounded the inner compartment with an air chamber, intended both to slow heat transfer and to keep moisture from the fireproof filling away from stored contents.

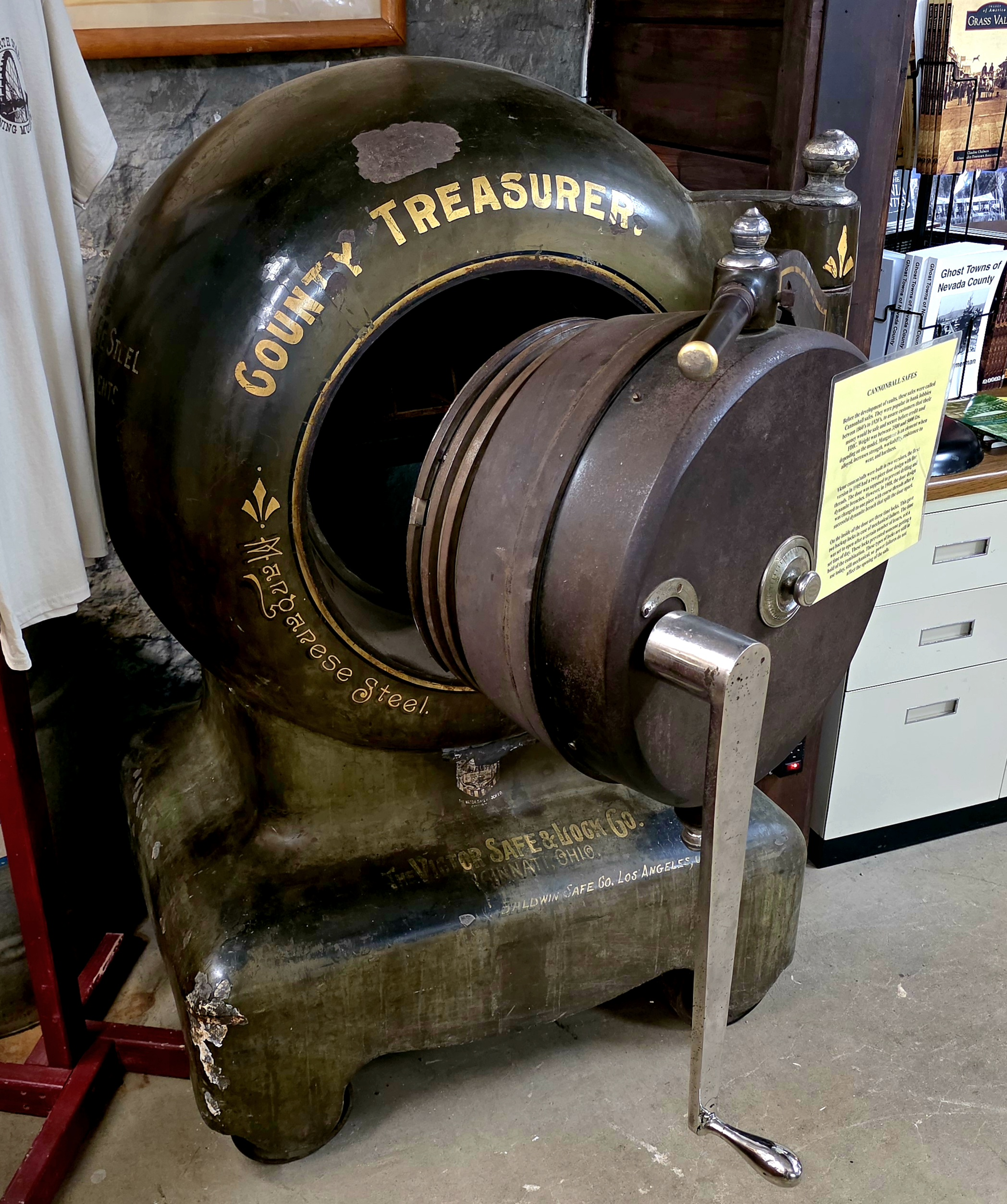
A cannonball safe made by the Victor Safe and Lock Company of Cincinnati

== Specifications ==
Specifications for safes include some or all of the following parameters:

- Burglar-resistance
- Fire-resistance
- Environmental resistance (e.g., to water or dust)
- Type of lock (e.g., combination, key, time lock, electronic locking)
- Location (e.g., wall safe, floor safe)
- Smart safes as part of an automated cash handling system

It is often possible to open a safe without access to the key or knowledge of the combination; this activity is known as safe-cracking and is a popular theme in heist films.

A diversion safe, or hidden safe, is a safe that is made from an otherwise ordinary object such as a book, a candle, a can, or wall outlet. Valuables are placed in these hidden safes, which are themselves placed inconspicuously (for example, a book would be placed on a book shelf).

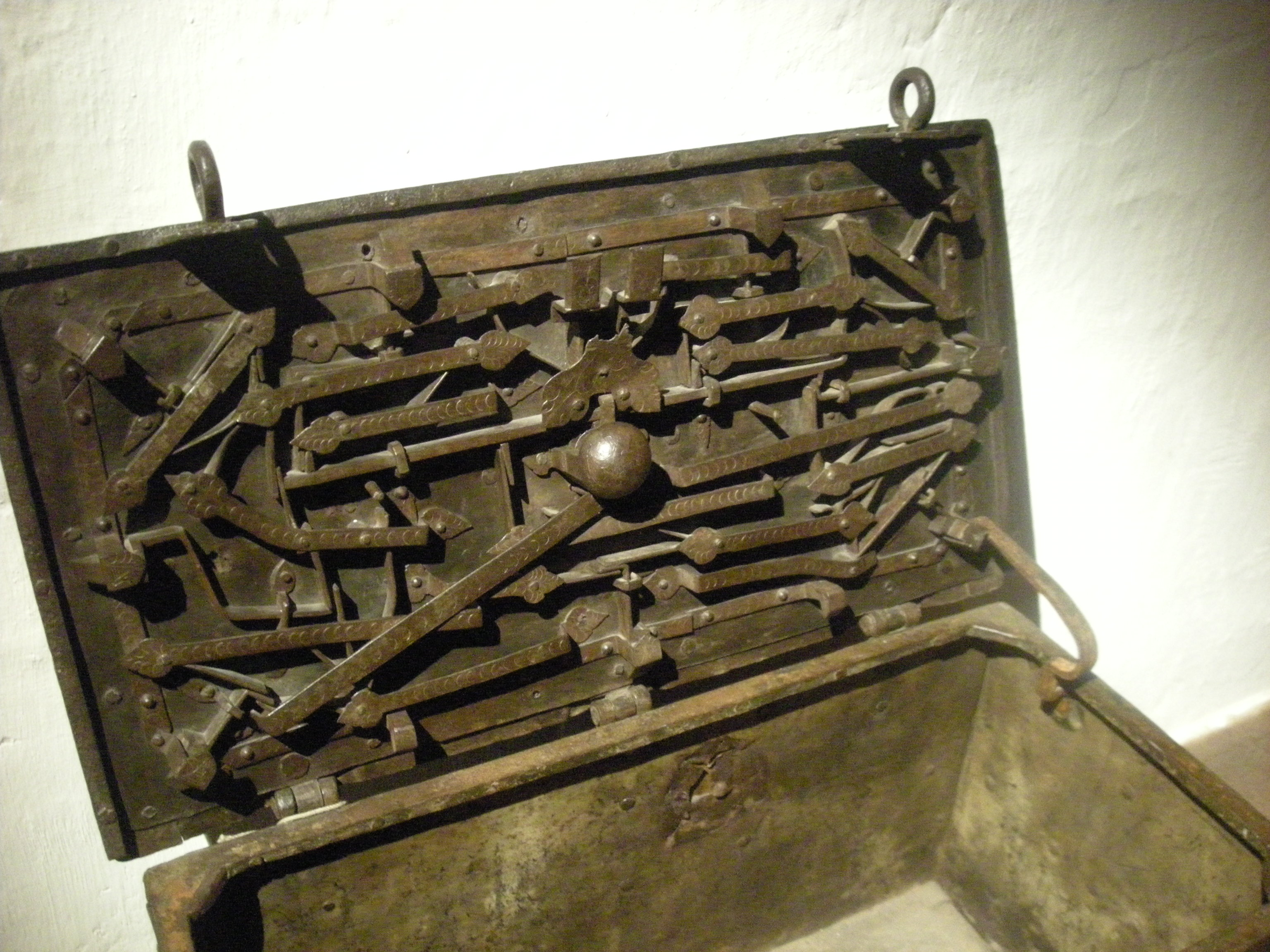
Strongbox multiple locking mechanism

Fire-resistant record protection equipment consists of self-contained devices that incorporate insulated bodies, doors, drawers or lids, or non-rated multi-drawer devices housing individually rated containers that contain one or more inner compartments for storage of records. These devices are intended to provide protection to one or more types of records as evidenced by the assigned Class rating or ratings; Class 350 for paper, Class 150 for microfilm, microfiche other and photographic film and Class 125 for magnetic media and hard drives. Enclosures of this type are typically rated to protect contents for 1/2, 1, 2, or 4 hours; they will not protect indefinitely. They may also be rated for their resistance to impact should the safe fall a specified distance onto a hard surface, or have debris fall upon it during a fire.

Burglary-resistant safes are rated as to their resistance to various types of tools and the duration of the attack.

Safes can contain hardware that automatically dispenses cash or validates bills as part of an automated cash handling system.

== Room-sized fireproof vaults ==
For larger volumes of heat-sensitive materials, a modular room-sized vault is much more economical than purchasing and storing many fire rated safes. Typically these room-sized vaults are utilized by corporations, government agencies and off-site storage service firms. Fireproof vaults are rated up to Class 125-4 Hour for large data storage applications. These vaults utilize ceramic fiber, a high temperature industrial insulating material, as the core of their modular panel system. All components of the vault, not just the walls and roof panels, must be Class 125 rated to achieve that overall rating for the vault. This includes the door assembly (a double door is needed since there is no single Class 125 vault door available), cable penetrations, coolant line penetrations (for split HVAC systems), and air duct penetrations.

There are also Class 150 applications (such as microfilm) and Class 350 vaults for protecting valuable paper documents. Like the data-rated (Class 125) structures, these vault systems employ ceramic fiber insulation and components rated to meet or exceed the required level of protection.

In recent years room-sized Class 125 vaults have been installed to protect entire data centers. As data storage technologies migrate from tape-based storage methods to hard drives, this trend is likely to continue.

== Fire-resistant safes ==
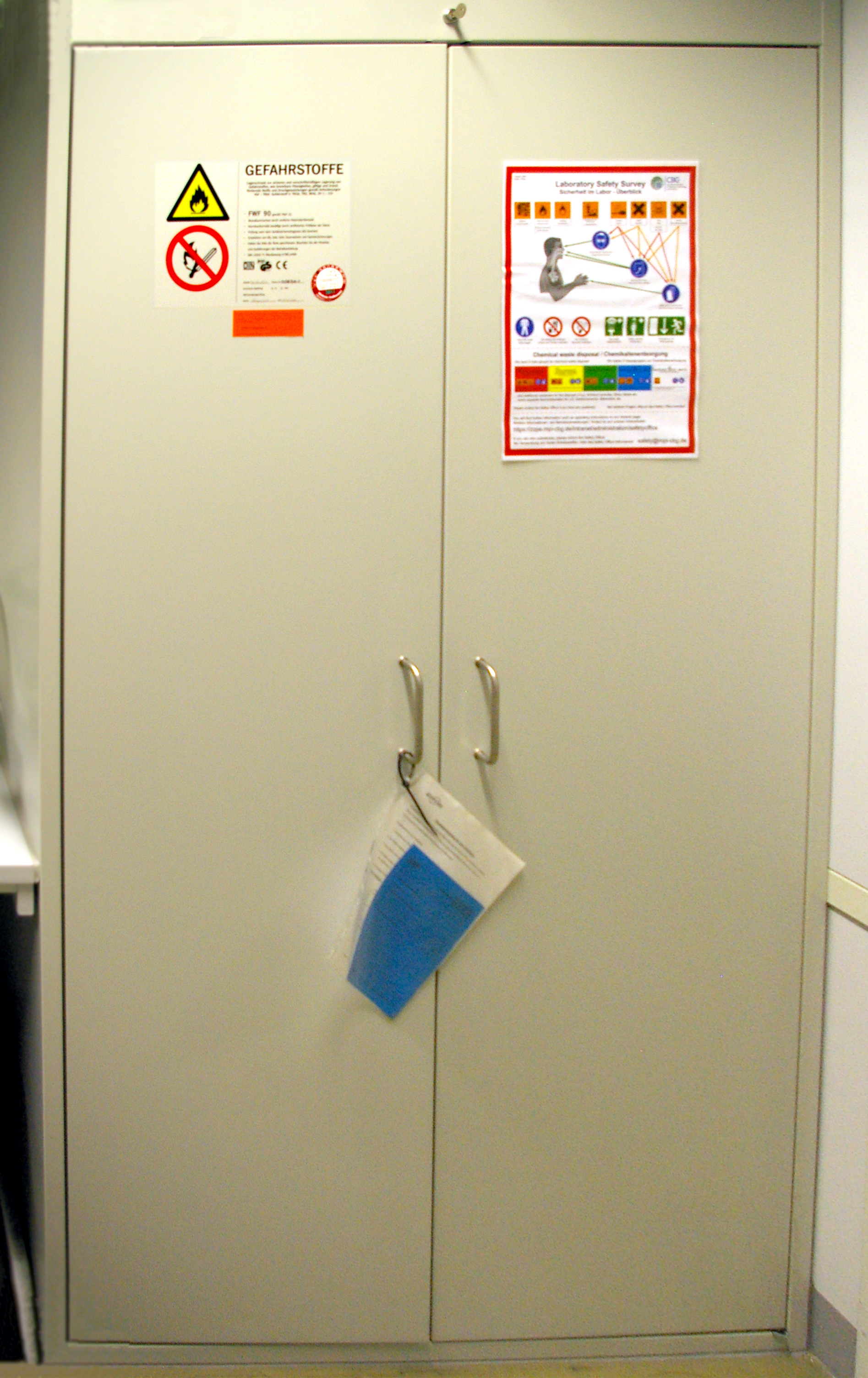
A reinforced, fireproof cabinet for dangerous chemicals

A fire-resistant safe is a type of safe that is designed to protect its contents from high temperatures or actual fire. Fire resistant safes are usually rated by the amount of time they can withstand the extreme temperatures a fire produces, while not exceeding a set internal temperature, e.g., less than 350 °F (177 °C). Models are typically available between half-hour and four-hour durations.

In the UK, the BS EN-1047 standard is set aside for data and document safes to determine their ability to withstand prolonged intense heat and impact damage.

- Document safes are designed to maintain an internal temperature no greater than 177 °C (351 °F) while in a constantly heated environment in excess of 1,000 °C (1,830 °F).
- Data safes are designed to maintain an internal temperature no greater than 55 °C (131 °F) while in a constantly heated environment in excess of 1,000 °C (1,830 °F).

These conditions are maintained for the duration of the test. This is usually at least 30 minutes but can extend to many hours depending on grade. Both kinds of safe are also tested for impact by dropping from a set height onto a solid surface and then tested for fire survivability once again.

In the United States, both the writing of standards for fire-resistance and the actual testing of safes is performed by Underwriters Laboratories.

An in-floor safe installed in a concrete floor is very resistant to fire. However, not all floor safes are watertight; they may fill with water from fire hoses. Contents can be protected against water damage by appropriate packaging.

Reinforced, fireproof cabinets are also used for dangerous chemicals or flammable goods.

== Wall safes ==
Wall safes are designed to provide hidden protection for documents and miscellaneous valuables. Adjustable depth allows the maximization of usable space when installed in different wall thicknesses. Some wall safes have pry-resistant recessed doors with concealed hinges. A painting or other wall decoration may be hung over a wall safe to hide it. Small safes may be fixed to a wall to prevent the entire safe being removed, without concealment.

Very small secure enclosures known as key safes, opened by entering a combination, are attached to the wall of a building to store the keys allowing access, so that they are available only to a person knowing the combination, typically for holiday lets, carers, or emergency use.

== Safe-cracking ==
Safe-cracking is opening a safe without a combination or key. There are many methods of safe-cracking ranging from brute force methods to guessing the combination. The easiest method that can be used on many safes is "safe bouncing", which involves hitting the safe on top; this may cause the locking pin to budge, opening the safe.

Physicist Richard Feynman gained a reputation for safe-cracking while working on the Manhattan Project during the Second World War. He did this for recreation, describing his experiences and methods in detail in his book Surely You're Joking, Mr. Feynman!. He made the point that the secure storage he successfully opened clandestinely (to which he would have been given access if he asked) contained contents far more important than any thief had ever accessed, all the secrets of the wartime atomic bomb project.

== Testing and certification ==
Safes are certified against separate standards for burglary resistance, fire resistance and lock performance rather than receiving one universal security rating. In North America, UL Solutions uses UL 687 for burglary-resistant safes, UL 608 for vault doors and modular panels, UL 768 for combination locks and UL 1037 for residential security containers and other antitheft devices. Fire resistance of record-protection equipment is evaluated under UL 72. Its testing includes fire endurance, which monitors internal temperature and humidity, and an optional impact test after a 30-foot (9.1 m) fall.

European standards divide the same functions among several documents. EN 1143-1 covers the burglary resistance of safes, ATM safes, strongroom doors and strongrooms, while EN 1143-2 covers deposit systems. EN 1300 classifies high-security locks by their resistance to unauthorized opening, and EN 1047-1 covers fire-resistant data cabinets and data inserts.

=== Fire ratings ===
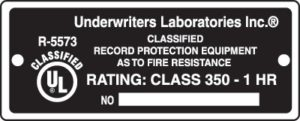
UL 1 Hour Fire Label

UL provides a variety of fire rating classifications, 125, 150, and 350 representing the maximum internal temperature in degrees Fahrenheit the safe may not exceed during the test. The classifications come in durations from 1/2-hour to 4 hours in length. The safe is exposed to gradually higher temperatures depending on the duration of the test. The most common standards being the 350 one hour (1,700 degrees) and 350 two hour (1,850 degrees) ratings as the temperature paper chars is approximately 451 degrees Fahrenheit.

=== Burglary ratings ===
UL standards are one of the principal North American protection standards. The resistance time limit specifies "tools on the safe" time without access to contents. The test might take hours to run and can be repeated as many times as the UL staff feel necessary to ensure that all prospective avenues of attack have been thoroughly explored.

=== Cash ratings ===
In Australia "Cash Rating" is used as an indication to the level of security rather than UL Ratings. A cash rating is a insurable rating that would be accepted by insurance companies when storing high value items. Some dedicated fire rated safes can have no cash rating, other models can vary from $2,000 to $500,000.

==== Residential security containers (RSC) ====
This is the entry level security rating offered by Underwriters Laboratories and it has its own standard: (UL 1037). The standard originally had one level, now known as RSC Level I. The standard was expanded in 2016 providing a greater range of security options. This standard also involves a drop test for products weighing not more than 750 pounds, simulating attempting to gain entry by dropping the safe.

- RSC Level I - Must withstand a five-minute attack by one technician using common hand tools such as drills, screwdrivers and hammers.
- RSC Level II - Must withstand a ten-minute attack by two technicians who use more aggressive tools such as picks, sledgehammers, pry bars, high-speed carbide drills and pressure applying devices. In addition, the technicians will attempt to make a six-square-inch opening in the door or the front face of the safe.
- RSC Level III - Also gives two technicians a ten-minute window to perform the test, but the range of tools become even more aggressive, and the size of the maximum attack opening must not exceed two square inches.

==== Tool-resistant safe (TL) ====
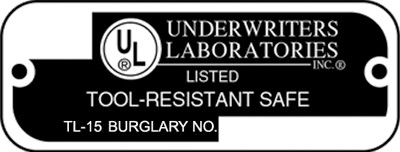
UL TL-15 Tool-Resistant Safe Label

Safes at this level are typically, but not exclusively, used for commercial applications such as jewelers and coin dealers. These ratings are granted to combination locked safes that successfully resist when attacked by two technicians with common hand tools, picking tools, mechanical or portable electric tools, grinding points, carbide drills and pressure applying devices or mechanisms. In addition to those requirements, the safe must weigh at least 750 pounds or come with instructions for anchoring, and have body walls of material equivalent to at least 1" open hearth steel with a minimum tensile strength of 50,000 psi. The UL Standard for tool-resistant safes and above are governed by UL Standard 687.

- TL-15 - This is a combination-locked safe that offers limited protection against combinations of common mechanical and electrical tools. The safe will resist abuse for 15 minutes from tools such as hand tools, picking tools, mechanical or electric tools, grinding points, carbide drills and devices that apply pressure. While the UL 687 defines this as a "limited degree" of protection, that standard is used for commercial applications, and the TL-15 rating offers significantly better protection than many unrated safes.
- TL-30 - This safe offers moderate protection against combinations of mechanical and electrical tools. The safe will resist abuse for 30 minutes from the same tools as the TL-15 test, plus more aggressive tools including cutting wheels and power saws.
- TL-30x6 - This is safe can withstand the same assaults as the TL-30 but protection is offered on all six-sides of the body as opposed to only the door.

==== Torch and tool resistant safe (TRTL) ====
- TRTL-30x6 - This is a combination-locked safe that offers high protection against combinations of mechanical, electrical, and cutting tools. The safe will resist abuse for 30 minutes from tools such as hand tools, picking tools, mechanical or electrical tools, grinding points, carbide drills, devices that apply pressure, cutting wheels, power saws, impact tools and, in addition, can withstand an oxy-fuel welding and cutting torch (tested gas limited to 1,000 cubic feet (28 m^{3}) combined total oxygen and fuel gas.)
- TRTL-60x6 - This class will withstand the same assaults as Class TRTL-30x6 for 60 minutes.

==== Torch, explosive and tool Resistant Safe (TXTL) ====
- TXTL-60x6 - This class meets all the requirements for Class TRTL-60x6 and in addition can withstand detonation of one charge of 4 ounces (110 g) of nitroglycerin, or other high explosive of equivalent energy. Multiple charges up to a total of 8 ounces (230 g) may be used.

== European safe standards ==
Depending on the usage, the European Committee for Standardization has published different European standards for safes. Testing and certification according to these standards should be done by an accredited certification body, e.g. European Certification Body.

- EN 1143-1 is the main testing standard for safes, ATM safes, strongroom doors and strongrooms. For safes it features eleven resistance grades (0, I, II, ..., to X). From one grade to the next the security rises by approximately 50%. Testing is based on a free choice of attack tools and methods. Testing requires partial access (hand hole) and complete access attempts, on all sides of the product. The security is calculated by using ratings of tools and the attack time. The result is expressed in resistance units (RU).
- EN 14450 is a testing standard for secure cabinets and strongboxes. The standard covers products meant for purposes where the security resistance required is less than that of EN 1143–1.

For fire-resistant safes the EN 1047-1 (fire resistance standard similar to the fire resistance safe standard of UL) and EN 15659 (for light fire storage units) were published.

== Gallery ==
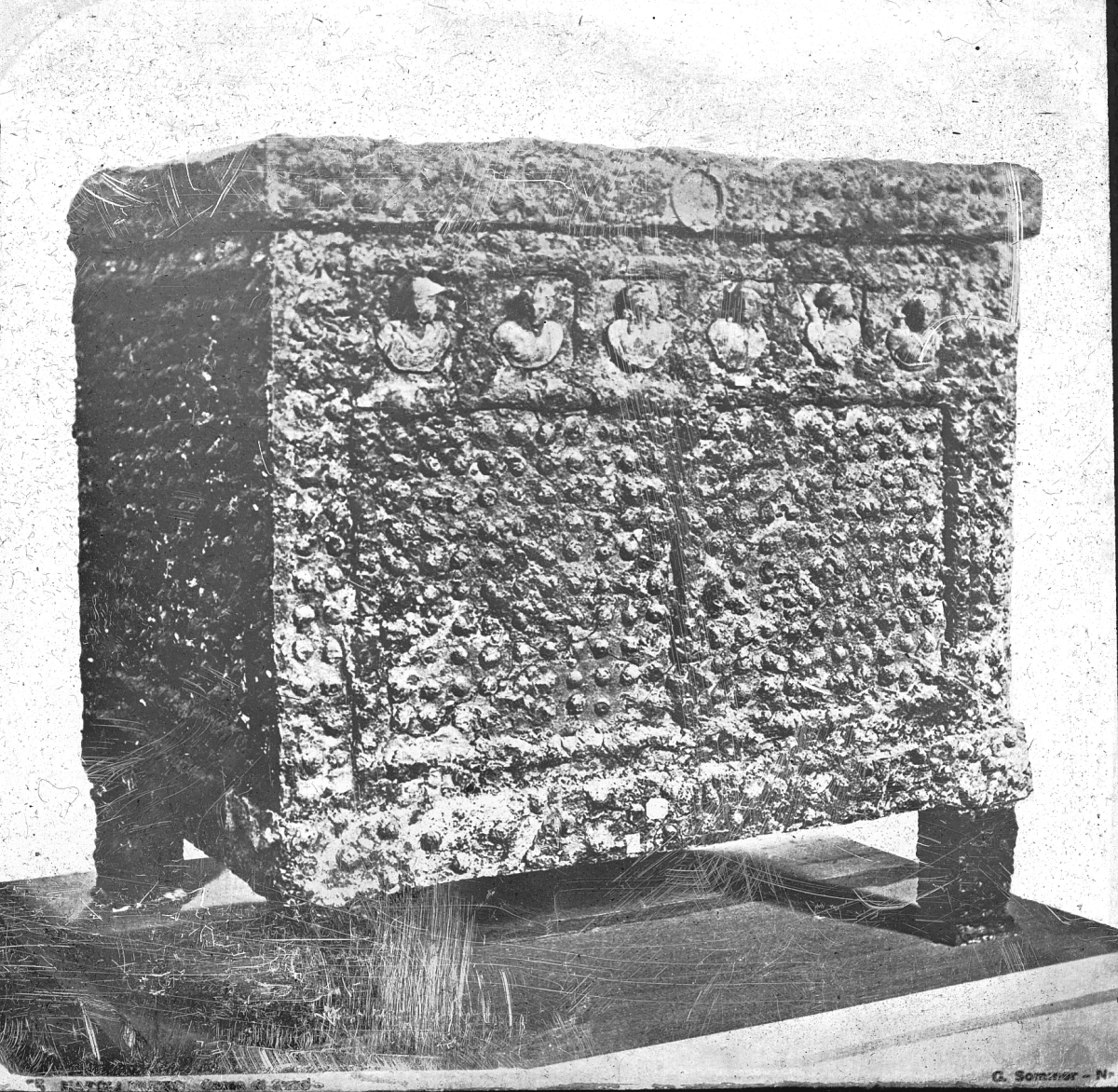
Iron safe with bronze decorations, including appliqué heads of deities arranged in a row, found in Pompeii, now in the National Archaeological Museum of Naples

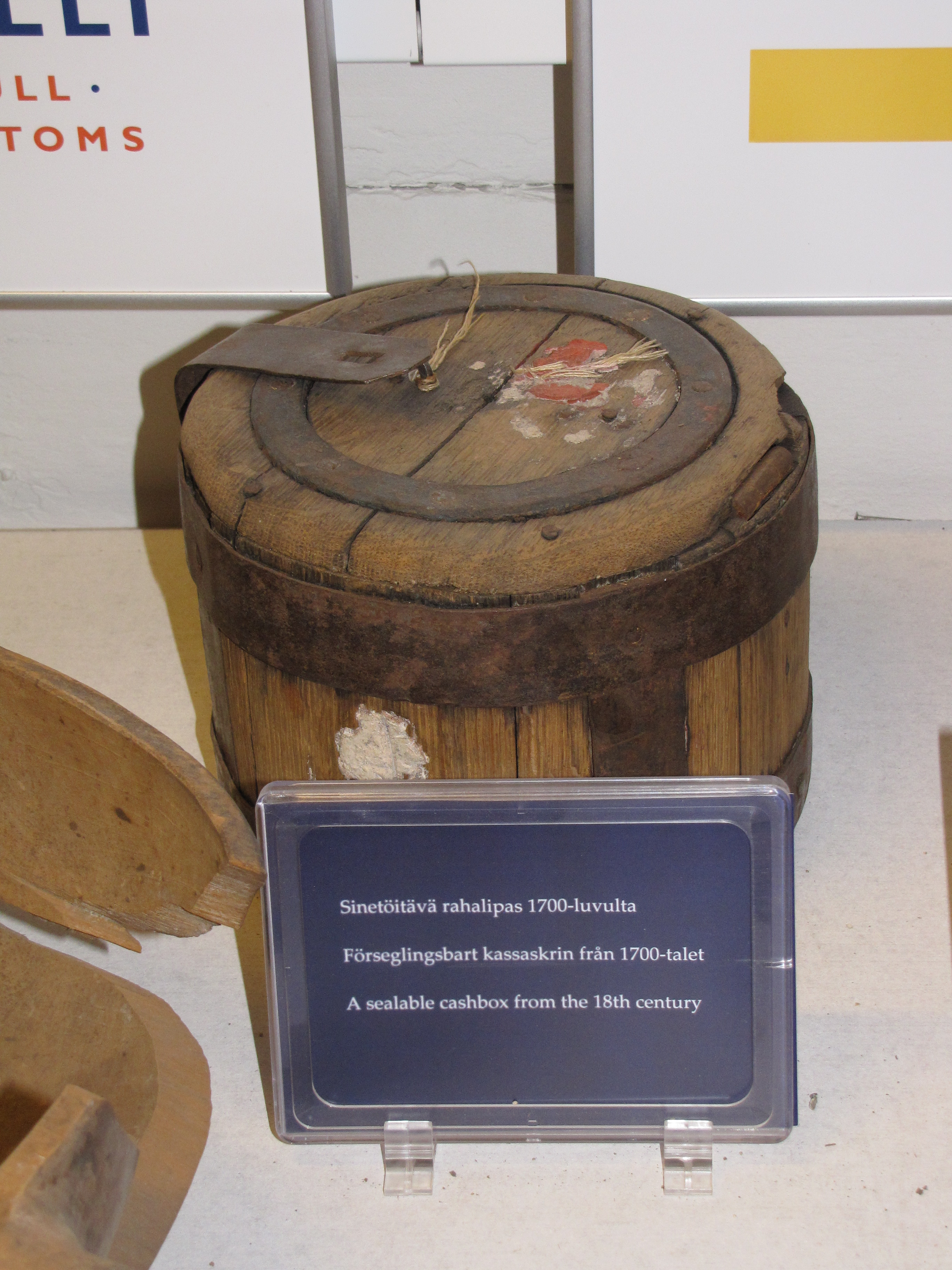
18th century sealable cashbox, sometimes called a barrel safe (Finnish customs service museum in Susisaari, Suomenlinna)

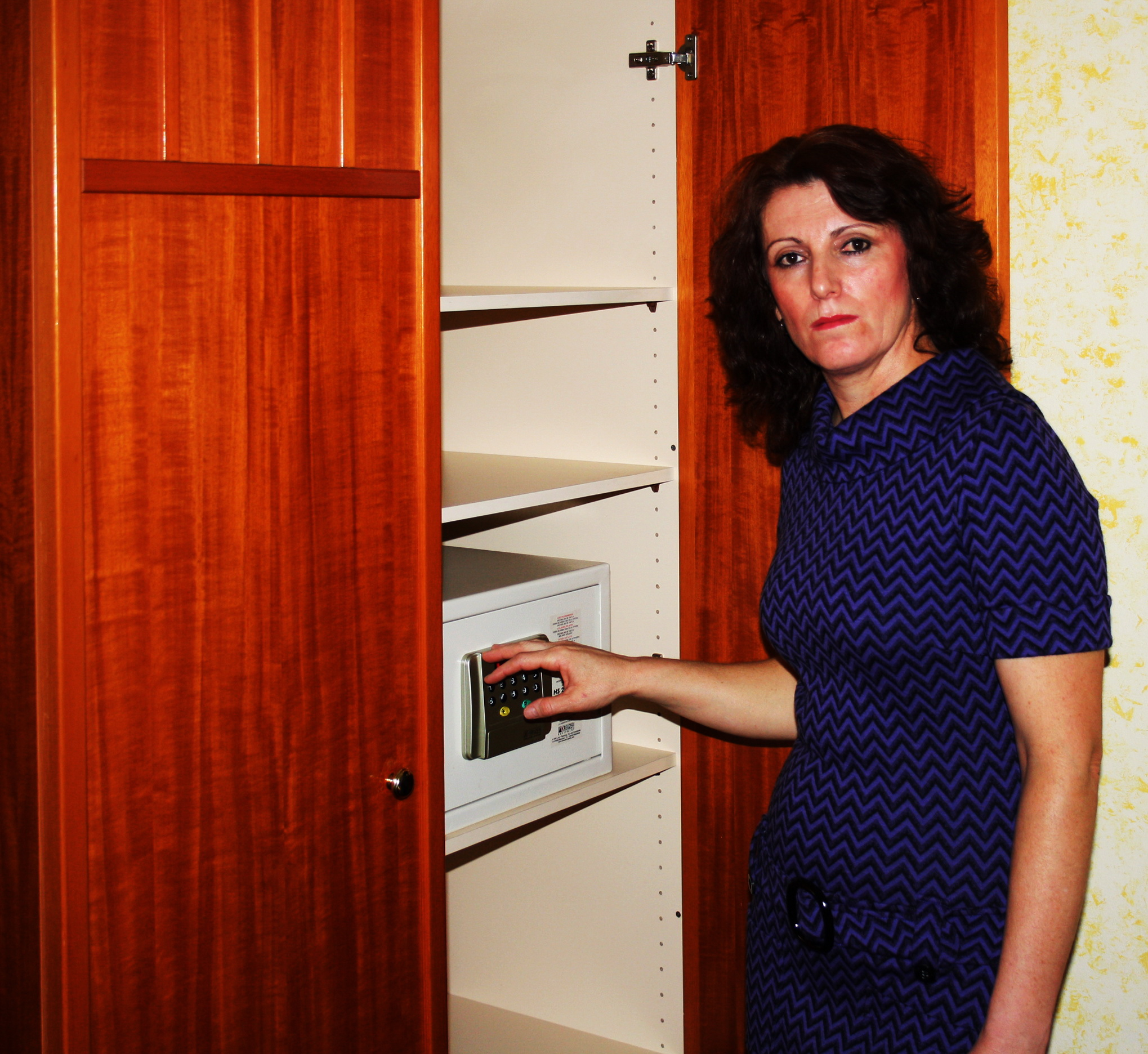
A small hotel safe, secured to a wall to also prevent it being removed unopened.

== See also ==
- Access control
- Concealment device
- United States government safe and vault door specifications
- Gun safe
- Lock
- Manual override
- Physical security
- Safe deposit box
- Security
- Safe room
- Strongroom
- Time-delay combination locks
