= European Certification Body =

Accreditor of physical security products in Europe

„European Certification Body“ (ECB) is a since 7 July 1992 accredited (ISO/IEC 17065) and neutral certification body for physical security products. It certifies according to (European Standards) – without any national additional requirements. ECB issues the ECB•S certification mark.

== ECB•S-certification program ==
- Secure safe cabinets and Safe
- ATM safes
- Strongrooms
- Deposit systems (deposit safes and night safes)
- Light fire storage units
- Data cabinets, Data rooms
- Burglar resistant construction products (Windows, Doors, Shutters)
- High security locks

== Certification ==
Certified security products may be marked with the blue ECB•S certification mark. A requirement of the ECB•S certification is a type testing according to European Standards. The type test is based on an authentic and real-life simulation e.g. of a burglary or a fire. The result of the test leads to the qualification of the product (e.g. resistance grade I, II, III for a safe). Ongoing audits in the manufacturing plants are necessary to maintain an equal quality.

== Insurance ==
The ECB•S certification gives insurance companies a basis for the calculation of risks. Very often insurance companies assure worths only if they are kept in a tested and certified secure storage unit. Therefore it is recommended also by governmental bodies, e.g. the police, to better choose certified security products in doubt.

The storage of weapons or medicine can require certified secure storage products.

== History/Background ==
ECB is together with the international security association ESSA the follow-up organisations of the FuP e.V. The FuP, founded in 1969, initiated and forced the standardization of physical security products. At first in Germany, later on also on the European Market.
