= Bank vault =

Secure space where valuable items are stored

A bank vault is a secure room used by banks to store and protect valuables, cash, and important documents. Modern bank vaults are typically made of reinforced concrete and steel, with complex locking mechanisms and security systems. This article covers the design, construction, and security features of bank vaults.

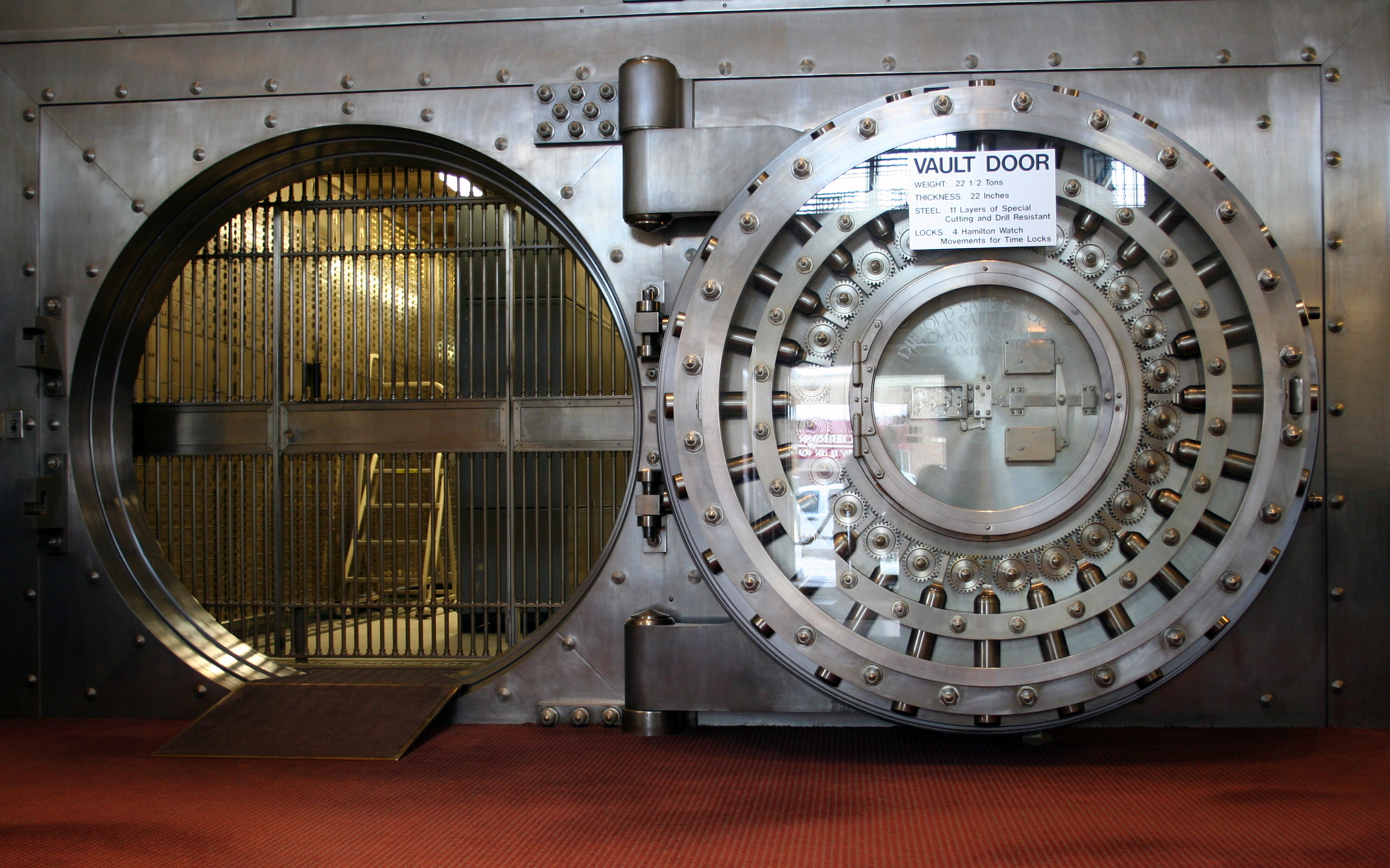
This large 24-bolt Diebold vault door at the Winona National Bank was built in the early 1900s. On the right is the back side of the open door. To the right of the door's center are two linked boxes for the combination mechanisms and to the left is a four-movement time lock. This door has a four-point system for pressing the door into its opening (note the two stanchions left of the door opening) capable of exerting one third of the door's weight in closing force. Since this door weighs 22.5 short tons (20.4 t) this system is capable of applying 7.5 short tons-force (67 kN) inward.

Unlike safes, vaults are an integral part of the building within which they are built, using armored walls and a tightly fashioned door closed with a complex lock.

Historically, strongrooms were built in the basements of banks where the ceilings were vaulted, hence the name. Modern bank vaults typically contain many safe deposit boxes, as well as places for teller cash drawers and other valuable assets of the bank or its customers. They are also common in other buildings where valuables are kept such as post offices, grand hotels, rare book libraries and certain government ministries.

Vault technology developed in a type of arms race with bank robbers. As burglars came up with new ways to break into vaults, vault makers found new ways to foil them. Modern vaults may be armed with a wide array of alarms and anti-theft devices. Some 19th and early 20th century vaults were built so well that today they are difficult to destroy, even with specialized demolition equipment. These older vaults were typically made with steel-reinforced concrete. The walls were usually at least 1 ft (0.3 m) thick, and the door itself was typically 3.5 ft (1.1 m) thick. Total weight ran into the hundreds of tons. Today vaults are made with thinner, lighter materials that, while still secure, are easier to dismantle than their earlier counterparts.

== Design ==
Vault of a retail bank under demolition

Bank vaults are custom-designed and are usually one of the first elements considered when planning a new bank building. The vault manufacturer works with the bank to determine specifications like size, shape, and security features. Modern vaults are typically constructed using steel-reinforced modular concrete panels engineered for maximum strength and crush resistance. A 3-inch thick panel of specialized concrete can be up to 10 times stronger than an 18-inch panel of standard concrete.

Bank vaults are typically made with steel-reinforced concrete. This material was not substantially different from that used in construction work. It relies on its immense thickness for strength. An ordinary vault from the middle of the 20th century might have been 18 in (45.72 cm) thick and was quite heavy and difficult to remove or remodel around. Modern bank vaults are now typically made of modular concrete panels using a special proprietary blend of concrete and additives for extreme strength. The concrete has been engineered for maximum crush resistance. A panel of this material, though only 3 in (7.62 cm) thick, may be up to 10 times as strong as an 18 in-thick (45.72-cm) panel of regular formula concreted.

There are at least two public examples of vaults withstanding a nuclear blast. The most famous is the Teikoku Bank in Hiroshima whose two Mosler Safe Company vaults survived the atomic blast with all contents intact. The bank manager wrote a congratulatory note to Mosler. A second is a vault at the Nevada National Security Site (formerly the Nevada Test Site) in which an above ground Mosler vault was one of many structures specifically constructed to be exposed to an atomic blast in Operation Plumb Bob - Project 30.4:Response of Protective Vaults to Blast Loading.

== Manufacturing process ==
=== Panels ===
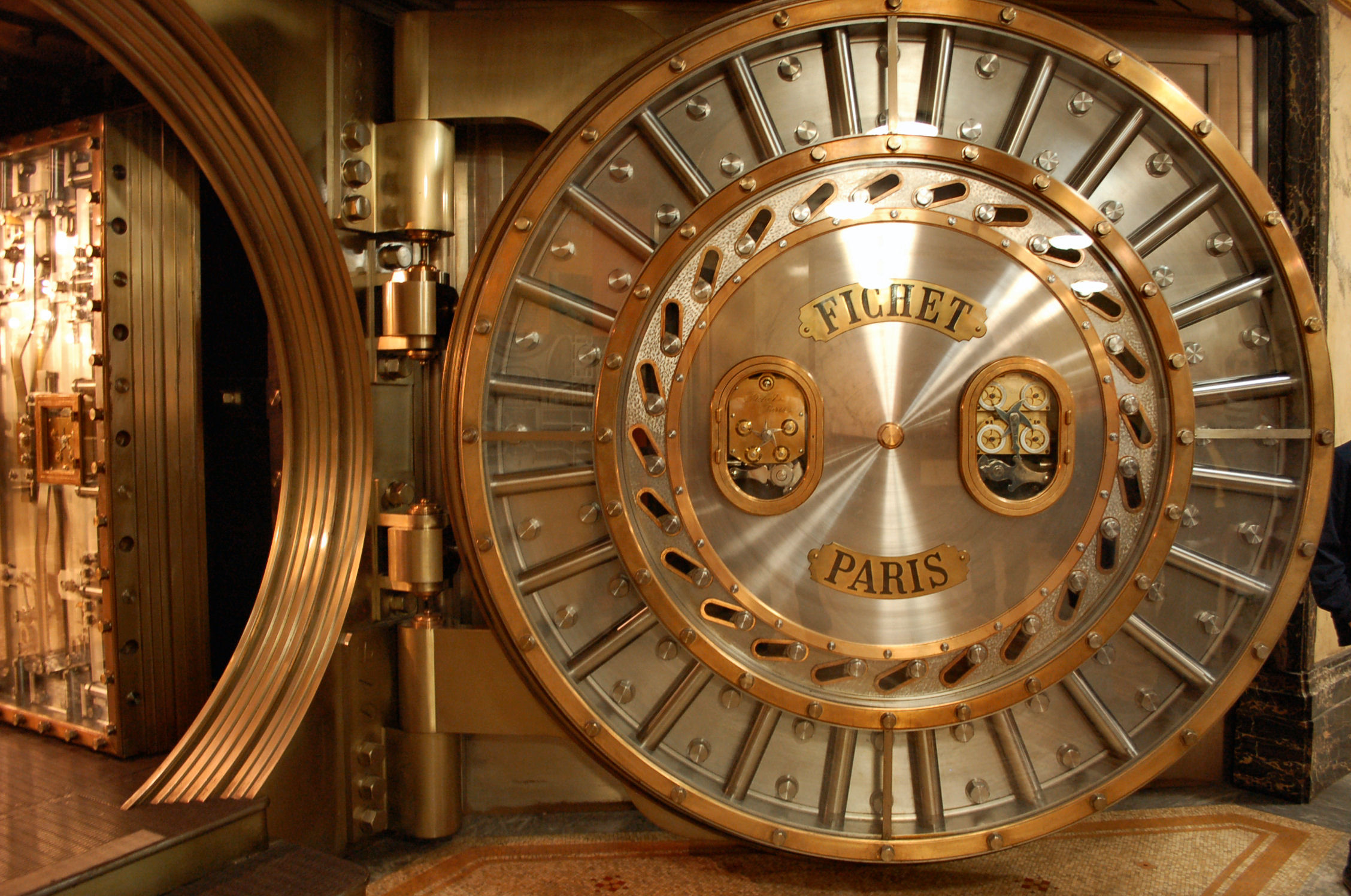
Fichet Paris, Vault of Crédit Lyonnais

The wall panels are molded first using a special reinforced concrete mix. In addition to the usual cement powder, stone, etc., additional materials such as metal shavings or abrasive materials may be added to resist drilling penetration of the slab. Unlike regular concrete used in construction, the concrete for bank vaults is so thick that it cannot be poured. The consistency of concrete is measured by its "slump". Vault concrete has zero slump. It also sets very quickly, curing in only six to 12 hours, instead of the three to four days needed for most concrete.

- A network of reinforcing steel rods is manually placed into the damp mix.
- The molds are vibrated for several hours. The vibration settles the material and eliminates air pockets.
- The edges are smoothed with a trowel, and the concrete is allowed to harden.
- The panels are removed from the mold and placed on a truck for transport to the customer's construction site.

=== Door ===
The vault door is also molded of special concrete used to make the panels, but it can be made in several ways. The door mold differs from the panel molds because there is a hole for the lock and the door will be clad in stainless steel. Some manufacturers use the steel cladding as the mold and pour the concrete directly into it. Other manufacturers use a regular mold and screw the steel on after the panel is dry.

Round vault doors were popular in the early 20th century and are iconic images for a bank's high security. They fell out of favor due to manufacturing complexities, maintenance issues (door sag due to weight) and cost, but a few examples are still available.

A day gate is a second door inside the main vault door frame used for limited vault protection while the main door is open. It is often made of open metal mesh or glass and is intended to keep a casual visitor out rather than to provide true security.

=== Lock ===
A vault door, much like the smaller burglary safe door, is secured with numerous massive metal bolts (cylinders) extending from the door into the surrounding frame. Holding those bolts in place is some sort of lock. The lock is invariably mounted on the inside (behind) of the difficult-to-penetrate door and is usually very modest in size and strength, but very difficult to gain access to from the outside. There are many types of lock mechanisms in use:

- A combination lock similar in principle to that of a padlock or safe door is very common. This is usually a mechanical device but products incorporating both mechanical and electronic mechanisms are available, making certain safe cracking techniques very difficult.
- Some high-end vaults employ a two-piece key to be used in conjunction with a combination lock. This key consists of a long stem as well as a short stamp which should be safeguarded separately and joined to open the vault door.
- A dual control (dual custody) combination lock has two dials controlling two locking mechanisms for the door. They are usually configured so that both locks must be dialed open at the same time for the door to be unlocked. No single person is given both combinations, requiring two people to cooperate to open the door. Some doors may be configured so that either dial will unlock the door, trading off increased convenience for lessened security.
- A time lock is a clock that prevents the vault's door from opening until a specified number of hours have passed. This is still the "theft proof" lock system that Sargent invented in the late nineteenth century. Such locks are manufactured by only a few companies worldwide. The locking system is supplied to the vault manufacturer preassembled.
- Many safe-cracking techniques also apply to the locking mechanism of the vault door. They may be complicated by the sheer thickness and strength of the door and panel.

=== Installation ===
- The finished vault panels, door, and lock assembly are transported to the bank construction site. The vault manufacturer's workers then place the panels enclosed in steel at the designated spots and weld them together. The vault manufacturer may also supply an alarm system, which is installed at the same time. While older vaults employed various weapons against burglars, such as blasts of steam or tear gas, modern vaults instead use technological countermeasures. They can be wired with a listening device that picks up unusual sounds, or observed with a camera. An alarm is often present to alert local police if the door or lock is tampered with.

== US resistance standards ==
Quality control for much of the world's vault industry is overseen by Underwriters Laboratories, Inc. (UL) in Northbrook, Illinois. UL rates vaults based on their resistance to mock break-in attempts. Key points of the UL-608 standard include:

- Testing uses common hand tools, power tools, and cutting torches
- A breach is defined as a 96 square inch hole or disabling of locking bolts
- Only active working time is counted (excludes setup, breaks, etc.)
- Does not test resistance to thermal lance or explosives
- Applies to the door and all vault sides
- Separate standards cover locks, ventilation, and alarms

Rating	Time to Breach Vault
Class M	15 minutes
Class I	30 minutes
Class II	60 minutes
Class III	120 minutes

== European resistance standards ==
As with the US, Europe has agreed a series of test standards to assure a common view of penetrative resistance to forcible attack. The testing regime is covered under the auspices of Euronorm 1143-1:2012 (also known as BS EN 1143-1: 2012), which can be purchased from approved European standards agencies.

Key points include:

A modern highly portable core drill

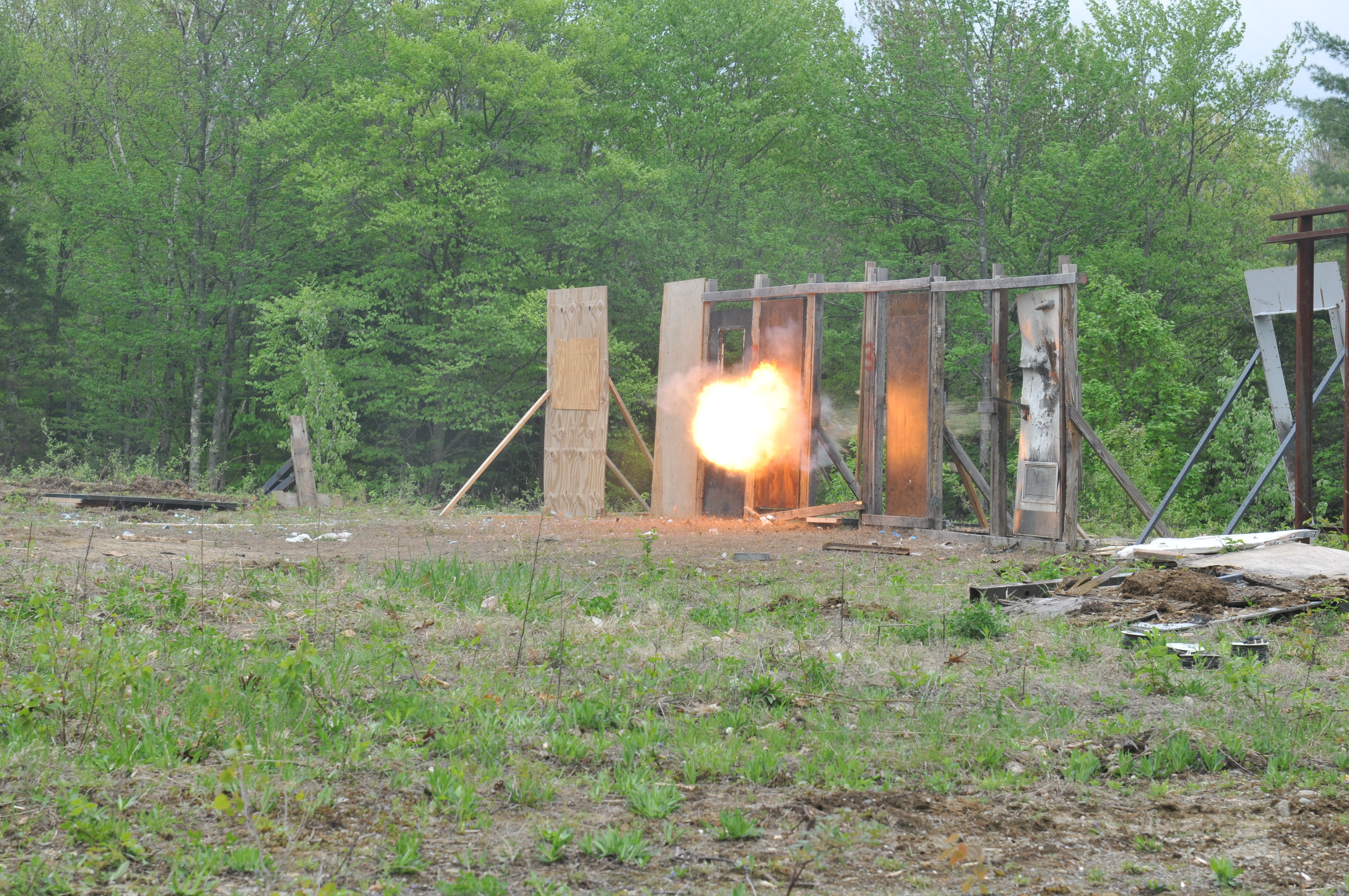
An explosive door breaching test

- Standard covers burglary resistance tests against free-standing safes and ATMs, as well as strongrooms and doors
- Tests are undertaken to arrive at a grade (0 to XIII) with two extra resistance qualifiers (one for the use of explosives the other for core drills)
- Test attack tools fall into five categories with increasing penetrative capability, i.e. Categories A–D and S
- Penetration success is measured as partial (125mm diameter hole) or full (350mm diameter hole)
- Considers only the time actually spent working (excludes setup, rests, etc.)
- EN 1143-1 makes no claims as to the fire resistance of the vault
- EN 1300 covers high security locks, i.e. four lock classes (A, B, C and D)
- Applies to the door and all vault sides.

Resistance Grade	Resistance Value to Breach Vault	Lock Quantity	Explosive Rating Possible	Core Drill Rating Possible
0	30	One	No	No
I	50	One	No	No
II	80	One	Yes	No
III	120	One	Yes	No
IV	180	Two	Yes	No
V	270	Two	Yes	No
VI	400	Two	Yes	No
VII	600	Two	Yes	No
VIII	825	Two	Yes	Yes
IX	1050	Two	Yes	Yes
X	1350	Two	Yes	Yes
XI	2000	Two or Three	Yes	Yes
XII	3000	Two or Three	Yes	Yes
XIII	4500	Two or Three	Yes	Yes

== Future ==
Bank vault technology changed rapidly in the 1980s and 1990s with the development of improved concrete material. Bank burglaries are also no longer the substantial problem they were in the late 19th century up through the 1930s, but vault makers continue to alter their products to counter new break-in methods.

An issue in the 21st century is the thermal lance. Burning iron rods in pure oxygen ignited by an oxyacetylene torch, it can produce temperatures of 6,600–8,000 °F (3,650–4,430 °C). The thermal lance user bores a series of small holes that can eventually be linked to form a gap. Vault manufacturers work closely with the banking industry and law enforcement in order to keep up with such advances in burglary.
