= Protector lock =

The term protector lock has referred to two unrelated lock designs, one invented in the 1850s by Alfred Hobbs, the other in 1874 by Theodor Kromer.

== Hobbs's protector lock ==
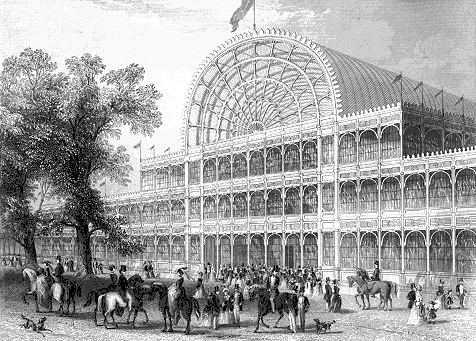
The Crystal Palace Exhibition, where Hobbs, designer of the Protector lock, became the first person to pick the supposedly "unpickable" Chubb detector lock.

The Protector lock (also called the "moveable lock") was an early 1850s lock design by the leading American locksmith Alfred Charles Hobbs, the first man to pick the six-levered Chubb detector lock, at the Crystal Palace Exhibition in 1851. That lock was created with the intent of being a lock that could not be picked.

Before Hobbs and his revolutionary lock designs, locks were opened by means of a series of false keys, in a process that could take an extremely long time. If the series was not properly completed in the lock, and the combination not completely correct, the lock could not be defeated. This design was accepted as quite unbreakable until Hobbs was able to pick them, using very fine and careful manual dexterity, applying a certain level of pressure on the bolt while manipulating each lever in turn with a tiny pick inserted through the keyhole.

In an attempt to create a better locking system, Hobbs patented the Protector lock, which, complex in design as it was, involved a transfer in pressure between the lock's internal bolt and tumbler mechanisms to a fixed pin. Hobbs claimed that his design was impossible to defeat and superior to the locks that were then in use, but, in 1854, one of Chubb's locksmiths was able to crack it with the help of special tools.

The Protector lock was distinct from Hobbs's other major lock design of the time, which he called the American lock and which slightly preceded the Protector lock. The American lock was complicated to use and expensive to purchase, with the added disadvantage of requiring a very large key, but it did not differ greatly from the Protector lock as far as security was concerned. The Protector lock was described as much simpler to use. The one advantage of the American lock over the Protector lock was its potential for greater security, if certain internal parts of the lock and key were arranged in a particular way.

== Kromer's protector lock ==
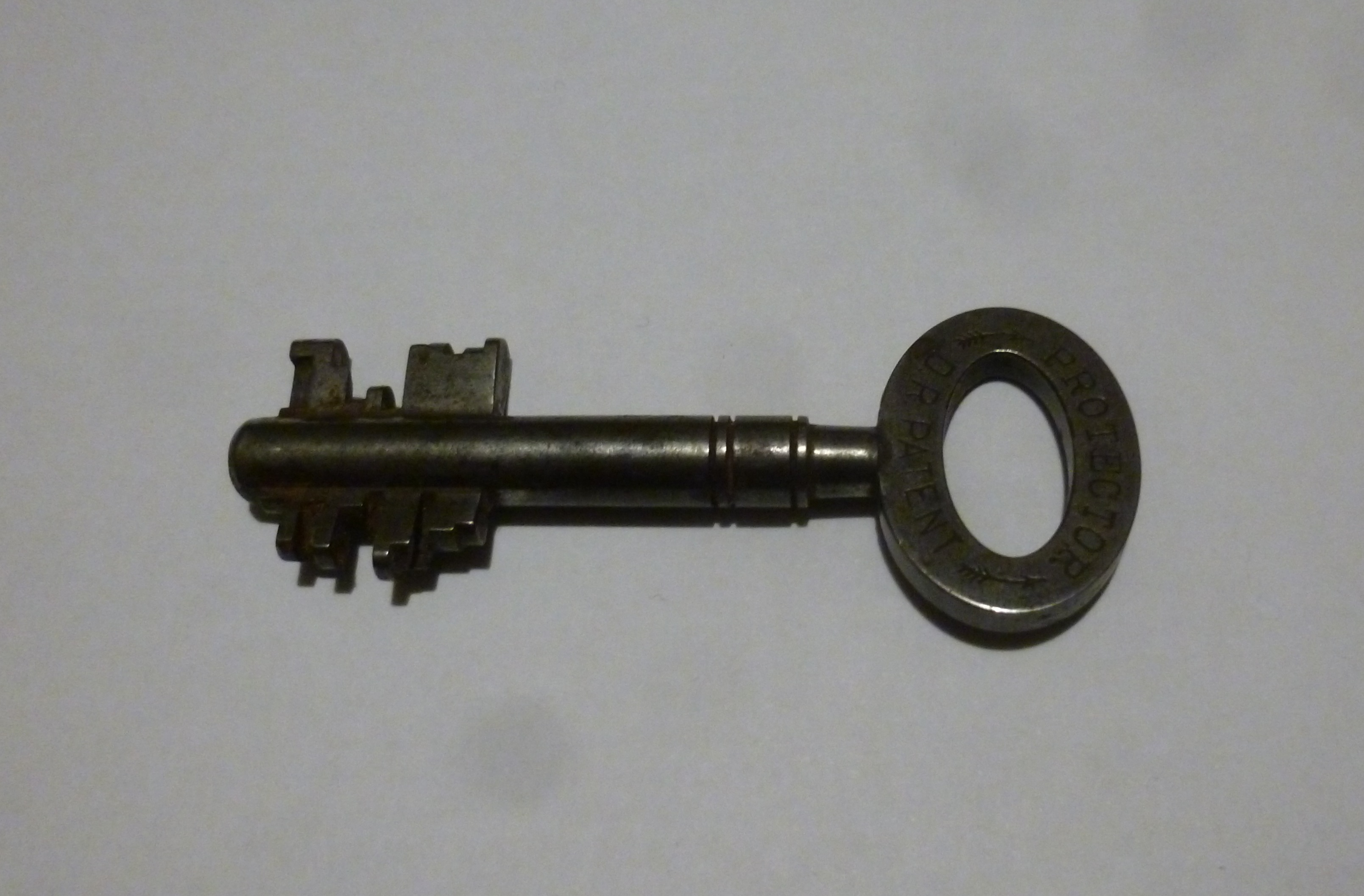
A key from an early example of a Kromer protector lock; these keys were made in all shapes and sizes but the bit is similar in all cases

The protector lock of Theodor Kromer was a high-security lock first patented in Prussia in 1874. Earlier competing designs included the American Alfred Charles Hobbs's protector lock (described above), the Chubb detector lock, and the Englishman Joseph Bramah's lock. Kromer's lock was designed for mass production and was highly successful, rapidly outselling Bramah's. It was produced for more than 125 years with many further patented developments, and is regarded as one of the most secure locks ever made, remaining without a public demonstration of picking until October 2022.

Kromer was a mechanic born in Neustadt in 1839. He founded the Kromer company together with his brother Carl in 1868. In design, his lock was a tumbler- or wafer-lock containing eleven wafers stacked in a central cylindrical core, slotted on each side such that the wafers project one side or the other when locked. When the correct key is inserted and turned, the wafers are pushed to a position where they span the central core precisely, projecting from neither side, and at this point, the core is free to rotate in its housing. The wafers vary in design. Some are in one piece, others in two, such that the two halves must both be aligned. The lock was not only hard to pick; it was also difficult to tell what shape the key should have by mere inspection inside the key-hole.

The keys for the Kromer protector lock were designed to be extraordinarily difficult to copy. They are asymmetric, double-bitted keys, but unlike a typical key, some parts of the bit are bevelled such that the bit is longer or shorter on the leading edge than the trailing edge (i.e. the outer, working edge of the bit is not flat or gently rounded to match the circular path described by the key as it is turned). One cut in the key was also angled relative to the shaft. These various features are tested by the eleven wafers. Since the lock could be fitted to anything from a small strong-box to a huge bank vault, the keys were made in corresponding lengths, including foldable keys with sufficient length to pass through a thick vault door.
