= Close coupled =

Articles on Close coupled include:

- Close-coupled canard, an aeronautical term
- Close-coupled cistern and bowl, a type of flush toilet
- Close-coupled sedan, an obsolete type of automobile
