= MAP test =

MAP Test (stylized MaP Test, an acronym for Maximum Performance Test), is an independent, third-party testing regimen for the flushing power of contemporary toilets. It uses a combination of toilet paper and soybean paste. Whilst MaP only tests for bulk removal of up to 1000 grams of waste in a single flush of varying amounts of water, it is now regarded as an industry standard.

== See also ==
- Flush toilet
- Low-flush toilet
