= Philip Haas (inventor) =

American businessman

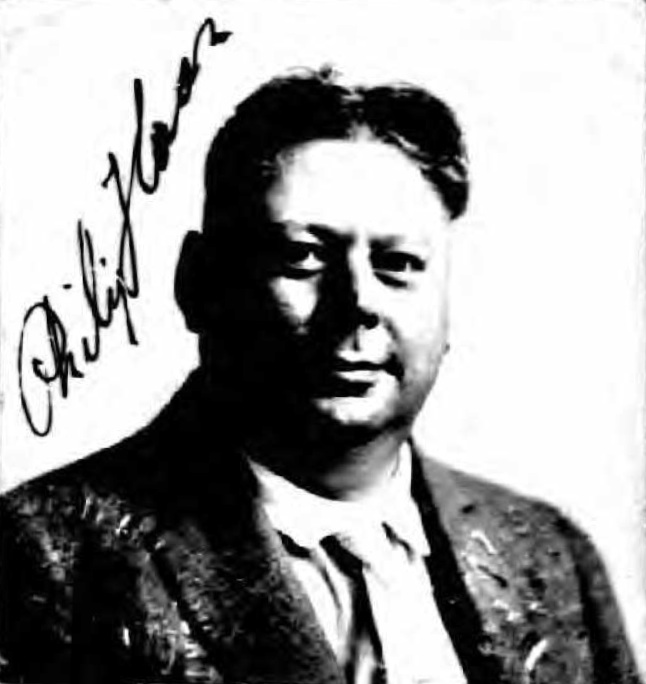
- Passport photograph from 1924 with signature
- Born: June 7, 1874; Michelstadt, Odenwaldkreis, Hesse, Germany
- Died: September 30, 1927; Dayton, Montgomery, Ohio, U.S.
- Education: Dayton Public Schools
- Occupations: Inventor, entrepreneur
- Spouse: Catherine Steiger (1877-1960)
- Children: Albertina Anna Haas (1900-1981); Marie K Haas (1903-1969); Helen Anna Haas (1906-1984); Alma Helen Haas (1908-1976); Esther Haas (1917-); Martha Nancy Haas (1918-1919)
- Parent(s): Michael Johann Haas (1840-1889); Albertina Brand (1844-1899)

Philip Haas (1874–1927) was an American inventor and entrepreneur who lived in Dayton, Ohio. Altogether, he received 31 patents in connection with innovations in the field of plumbing. His work was instrumental to the development of the modern toilet and was featured in the 2004 book Ingenious Inventions How They Work and How They Came to Be.

== Early life ==
Haas was born in Michelstadt, Odenwaldkreis, Hesse, Germany on June 7, 1874. His parents were Michael Johann Haas (1840-1889), from the nearby village of Vielbrunn, and Albertina Brand (1844-1899), from Kleinheubach in Bavaria. He was the fifth of ten known children.

The family emigrated to the United States in 1888, when Haas was 14 years of age. The family settled in Dayton, Ohio, which was, at the time, a center of innovation and invention. Haas apprenticed as a plumber shortly after his arrival. On October 25, 1895, he became a naturalized citizen of the United States in the Probate Court of Dayton.

== Marriage and children ==
On August 26, 1900, 26-year-old Philip Haas married 23-year-old Catherine "Katie" Steiger at St. John's Evangelical Lutheran Church in Dayton. The couple had six daughters, five of whom survived beyond infancy. In order of birth, they were: Albertina Anna Haas (1900–1981), Marie K Haas (1903–1969), Helen Anna Haas (1906–1984), Alma Helen Haas (1908–1976), Esther Haas (1917– ), and Martha Nancy Haas (1918–1919).

== Inventions ==
Over the course of his career, Haas would apply for and receive 31 patents. All of these, in one way or another, related to improvements to the toilet or associated devices. The toilet was not the invention of a single person. It evolved into its present form through contributions from various sources. The Romans had toilets that conveyed away waste with running water. In the 1590s, Englishman, Sir John Harington (1561–1612) contrived a crude flush toilet. However, Haas' efforts, perhaps more so than those of any other one person, helped transform the toilet from a notoriously unreliable device into the modern commode.

=== Frost-Proof Toilet Improvements ===
Most of Haas' early work as an inventor focused on the improvement of frost-proof toilets. It was in this field that, on February 10, 1903, he was issued his first two patents, numbers 720,021 and 720,022. At the time, many toilets were located in unheated spaces, such as outbuildings and warehouses. During periods of cold weather, bursting of pipes and stoppages were constant problems. Frost-free toilets had no water in the bowl and relied on a water supply from below the frost line in the soil. Haas' innovations in this field would provide few lasting benefits. That is because, over the next few decades, frost-free toilets faded into obscurity as sanitary facilities were moved within the envelopes of heated buildings.

=== Rim Flushing System ===
On June 23, 1911, Haas applied for a patent for the detachable flush rim toilet. The key feature was a ring that, through downward pointing perforations, discharged multiple jets of water beneath the rim of the bowl. The object of the invention, he stated, was to "insure the thorough washing of every portion of the hopper or bowl from its highest point, and adapted to concentrate a powerful jet of water upon that portion of the bowl most susceptible to soiling." On August 18, 1914 the US Patent Office issued patent number 1,107,515 for the flush rim toilet.

Commercial flushing valve design by Philip Haas incorporated in US Patent No. 1,614,468

=== Commercial Flush Valve ===
Haas also focused considerable energy on improving the commercial flush valve. These efforts resulted in a series of patents issued throughout the late 1910s and early 1920s. On June 5, 1924 he submitted a patent application for a hydraulic flush valve with many similarities to commercial fixtures in use today. It is characterized by a metal toggle knob protruding from a socket in the side of a cylindrical valve. In his application, Haas indicated "the construction of the valve mechanism is simplified, rendered more efficient and certain of operation, and whereby the valve may be installed and adjusted to accommodate variations in the pressure of water available in the connected supply...." The design is incorporated in Patent 1,614,468. Haas' designs in this area have been cited in numerous patent applications over the intervening years.

Mechanical drawing from US Patent No. 1,660,922 showing one of Philip Haas' many designs for the internal workings of a water closet

=== Water Closet Mechanics ===
From 1924 forward, Haas focused almost exclusively on improving the internal workings of the water closet for toilets in homes and light commercial settings. His first endeavors in this regard dealt with inlet valve mechanisms. However, his efforts soon led him to design and perfect an entire system, leading to at least six patents. The last of these, number 1,660,922, issued posthumously. Modern toilets incorporate many elements of Haas' water closet designs.

== Business ventures ==
Philip Haas went into the plumbing business with younger brother, William. The 1898-1900 Dayton City Directory listed the business under the heading "Philip Haas (H. Bros.)." The brothers subsequently operated as the Philip and William Haas Company. This concern grew rapidly, eventually branching into commercial contracting and parts supply. In 1907, the brothers agreed to an amicable separation of their business interests. William continued in business as a contractor and supplier, while Philip went into business as a plumbing specialties manufacturer. He incorporated under the Philip Haas Company, and moved his operations into a substantial facility at 123 North Webster Street in Dayton.

Haas' factory was severely damaged in the Great Dayton Flood of March, 1913, which inundated and destroyed large portions of the city. A trade journal published in April of that year indicated: "The plant of the Philip Haas Co., Dayton, Ohio, manufacturer of the Haas Frost-proof Water Closets and other specialties, was damaged by the floods to the extent of $5,000. The plant was under water to the depth of 16 feet, but the company expects to be in active operation again by April 20. No loss of life was suffered by anyone connected with the company."

== Death ==
On September 30, 1927, after a two-week illness, Philip Haas died at St. Elizabeth Hospital in Dayton of cardiac hypertrophy. He was 53 years old. He is buried in Woodland Cemetery in Dayton. His widow, Katie Haas, continued to run the Philip Haas Company after his death until the 1940s. She died on April 17, 1960.

== Patents ==
- US Patent # 720,021 - Water Closet with Improved Valve (Frost Proof). Application filed March 23, 1901; Patent issued to Philip Haas on February 10, 1903.
- US Patent # 720,022 - Frost Proof Compression. Application filed August 5, 1901; Patent issued to Philip Haas on February 10, 1903.
- US Patent # 882,944 - Water Closet Valve. Application filed June 22, 1906; Patent issued to Philip Haas on March 24, 1908.
- US Patent # 894,734 - Water Closet Improvements. Application filed July 8, 1907; Patent issued to Philip Hass July 28, 1908.
- US Patent # 1,034,789 - Water Closet Valve. Application filed June 23, 1911; Patent issued to Philip Haas August 6, 1912.
- US Patent # 1,083,088 - Flushing Device for Water Closets. Application filed May 28, 1912; Patent issued to Philip Haas December 30, 1913
- US Patent # 1,107,515 - Flush Rim Toilet. Application filed December 2, 1912; Patent issued to Philip Haas August 18, 1914
- US Patent # 1,111,744 - Frost Proof Tank Flushing Device. Application filed June 12, 1912; Patent issued to Philip Haas September 29, 1914
- US Patent # 1,111,745 - Flushing Device for Water Closets. Application filed June 12, 1912; Patent issued to Philip Haas September 29, 1914
- US Patent # 1,111,746 - Ventilating Water Closet/Flushing Valve Mechanism. Application filed June 19, 1912; Patent issued to Philip Haas September 29, 1914.
- US Patent # 1,143,384 - Flushing Valve. Application filed June 19, 1912; Patent issued to Philip Haas June 15, 1915.
- US Patent # 1,142,092 Automatic Water Closet Valve/Ventilating. Application filed October 30, 1913; Patent issued to Philip Haas June 8, 1915.
- US Patent # 1,185,307 - Flushing Valve. Application filed June 1, 1915; Patent issued to Philip Haas May 30, 1916.
- US Patent # 1,300,261 - Improved Valve Mechanism for Toilet. Application filed December 2, 1918; Patent issued to Philip Haas April 15, 1919.
- US Patent # 1,303,472 - Frost Proof Valve Mechanism. Application filed December 2, 1918, Patent issued to Philip Haas May 13, 1919.
- US Patent # 1,316,715 - Pressurized Tank for Water Closet Valves. Application filed April 28, 1919; Patent issued to Philip Haas September 23, 1919.
- US Patent # 1,331,706 - Hydraulically Operated Flushing Valve Mechanism. Application filed August 19, 1919; Patent issued to Philip Haas February 24, 1920.
- US Patent # 1,331,707 - Hydraulically Operated Valve Mechanism. Application filed August 19, 1919; Patent issued to Philip Haas February 24, 1920.
- US Patent # 1,441,576 - Water Closet and Wall-Mounted Flush Rim Bowl. Application filed March 21, 1922, Patent issued to Philip Haas January 9, 1923
- US Patent # 1,490,106 - Automatic Flushing Valve. Application filed November 14, 1921; Patent issued to Philip Haas April 15, 1924.
- US Patent # 1,497,171 - Improved Toilet Wall Closet. Application filed November 14, 1921; Patent issued to Philip Haas June 10, 1924.
- US Patent # 1,573,934 - Improved Frost Proof Water Closet Valve. Application filed May 22, 1924; Patent issued to Philip Haas February 23, 1926.
- US Patent # 1,576,600 - Inlet Valve Mechanism for Flush Tanks. Application filed June 9, 1925; Patent issued to Philip Haas March 16, 1926.
- US Patent # 1,601,210 - Inlet Valve Mechanism for Flush Tanks. Application filed February 26, 1924; Patent issued to Philip Haas September 28, 1926.
- US Patent # 1,605,939 - Flushing Valve Mechanism for Water Closets. Application filed March 24, 1925; Patent issued to Philip Haas November 9, 1926.
- US Patent # 1,614,468 - Hydraulically Operated Flushing Valve Mechanism. Application filed June 5, 1924; Patent issued to Philip Haas June 18, 1927.
- US Patent # 1,623,109 - Flushing Valve Mechanism for Water Closet. Application filed June 9, 1925, Patent issued to Philip Haas April 5, 1927.
- US Patent # 1,629,914 - Inlet Valve Mechanism for Water Closet. Application filed November 16, 1926; Patent issued to Philip Haas May 24, 1927.
- US Patent # 1,638,395 - Flushing Valve Mechanism for Water Closet. Application filed November 16, 1926; Patent issued to Philip Haas August 9, 1927.
- US Patent # 1,639,997 - Toilet Inlet Valve Mechanism. Application filed March 16, 1926; Patent issued to Philip Haas August 23, 1927.
- US Patent # 1,660,922 - Flushing Apparatus for Water Closet. Application filed May 10, 1927; Patent issued to Executors of Philip Haas Estate February 28, 1928.
