= Joseph Bramah =

English inventor (1748-1814)

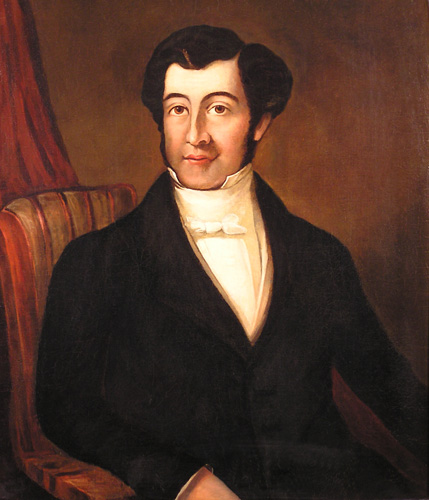
- Born: 13 April 1748; Stainborough, Yorkshire, England
- Died: 9 December 1814 (aged 66); Pimlico, London, England
- Known for: hydraulic press

Joseph Bramah (13 April 1748 – 9 December 1814) was an English inventor and locksmith. He is best known for having improved the flush toilet and inventing the hydraulic press. Along with William Armstrong, 1st Baron Armstrong, he can be considered one of the two fathers of hydraulic engineering.

== Early life ==
Joseph Bramah was the second son in the family of Joseph Bramma (note the different spelling of the surname), a farmer, and his wife, Mary Denton. He was educated at the local school in Silkstone in South Yorkshire, and on leaving school he was apprenticed to a local carpenter. On completing his apprenticeship he moved to London, where he started work as a cabinet-maker. In 1783 he married Mary Lawton of Mapplewell, near Barnsley, and the couple set up home in London. They subsequently had a daughter and four sons. The couple lived first at 124 Piccadilly, but later moved to Eaton Street, Pimlico.

== Improved water closet ==
In London, Bramah worked for a Mr. Allen, installing water closets (toilets) which were designed to a patent obtained by Alexander Cumming in 1775. He found that the current model being installed in London houses had a tendency to freeze in cold weather. Although it was Allen who improved the design by replacing the usual slide valve with a hinged flap that sealed the bottom of the bowl, Bramah obtained the patent for it in 1778, and began making toilets at a workshop in Denmark Street, St Giles.

== Bramah Locks company ==
After attending some lectures on technical aspects of locks, Bramah designed a lock of his own, receiving a patent for it in 1784. In the same year he started the Bramah Locks company at 124 Piccadilly, which is today based in Fitzrovia, London and Romford, Essex.

The locks produced by his company were famed for their resistance to lock picking and tampering, and the company famously had a "Challenge Lock" displayed in the window of their London shop from 1790 mounted on a board containing the inscription:

The artist who can make an instrument that will pick or open this lock shall receive 200 guineas the moment it is produced.

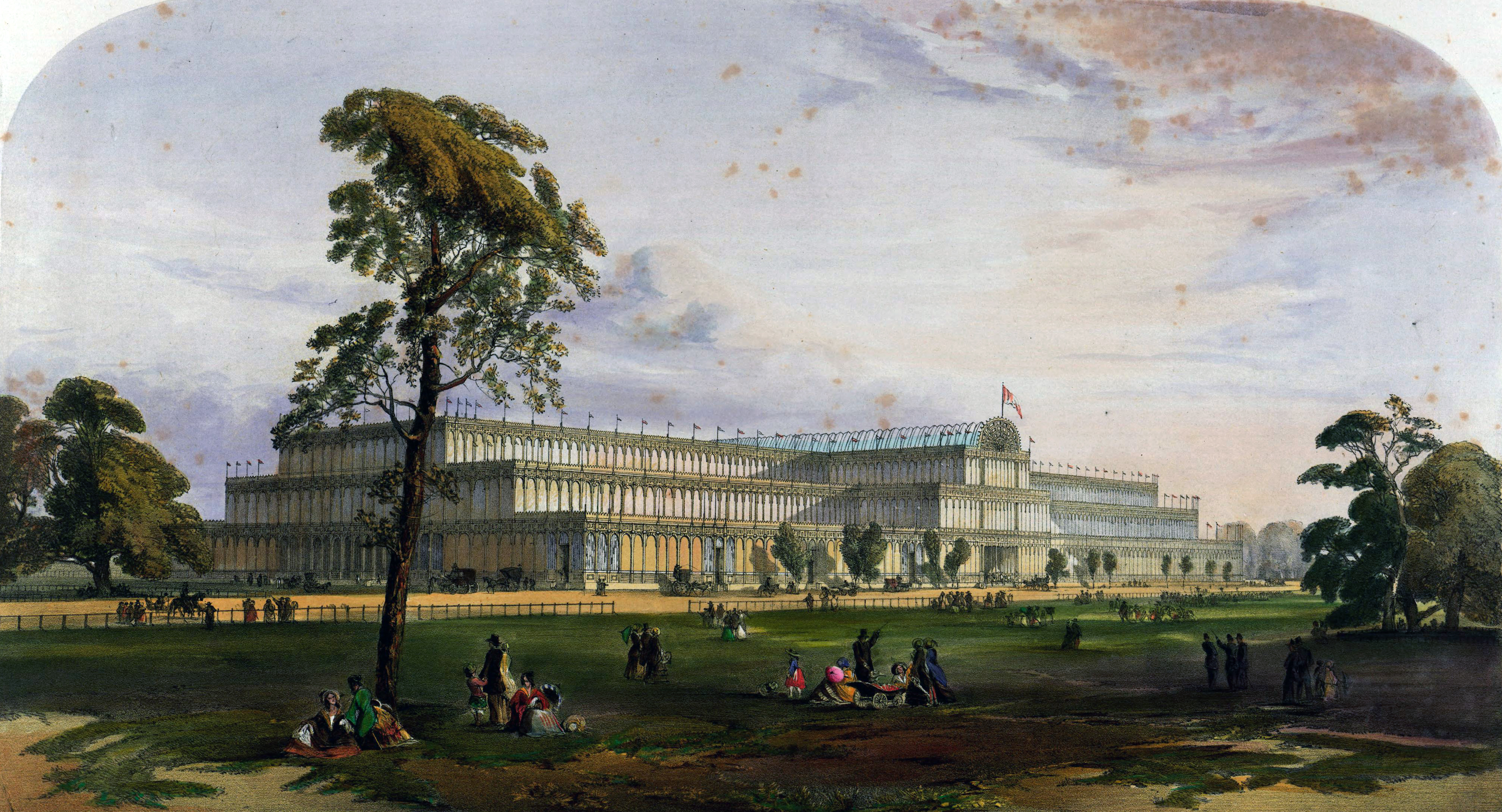
The Crystal Palace which housed the Great Exhibition in Hyde Park, London in 1851

The challenge stood for over 67 years until, at the Great Exhibition of 1851, the American locksmith Alfred Charles Hobbs was able to open the lock and, following some argument about the circumstances under which he had opened it, was awarded the prize. Hobbs' attempt required some 51 hours, spread over 16 days.

The Challenge Lock is in the Science Museum in London. An examination of the lock shows that it has been rebuilt since Hobbs picked it. Originally it had 18 iron slides and 1 central spring; it now has 13 steel slides, each with its own spring.

Bramah received a second patent for a lock design in 1798.

== Machine tools ==
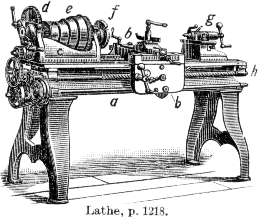
A metalworking lathe from 1911 showing component parts

Partly due to the precision requirements of his locks, Bramah spent much time developing machine tools to assist manufacturing processes. He relied heavily on the expertise of Henry Maudslay whom he employed in his workshop from the age of 18. Between them they created a number of innovative machines that made the production of Bramah's locks more efficient, and were applicable to other fields of manufacture.

Just before Bramah died, his workshops also employed Joseph Clement who among other things made several contributions in the field of lathe design.

== Hydraulic press ==
Bramah's most important invention was the hydraulic press. The hydraulic press depends on Pascal's principle, that pressure change throughout a closed system is constant. The press had two cylinders and pistons of different cross-sectional areas. If a force was exerted on the smaller piston, this would be translated into a larger force on the larger piston. The difference in the two forces would be proportional to the difference in area of the two pistons. In effect the cylinders act in a similar way that a lever is used to increase the force exerted. Bramah was granted a patent for his hydraulic press in 1795.

Bramah's hydraulic press had many industrial applications and still does today. At the time Bramah was bringing his concepts to fruition, the field of hydraulic engineering was an almost unknown science. Bramah and William Armstrong, 1st Baron Armstrong were the two pioneers in the field.

The hydraulic press is still known as the Bramah Press after its inventor.

== Other inventions ==
Bramah was a prolific inventor, though not all of his inventions were as important as his hydraulic press. They included: a beer engine (1797), a planing machine (1802), a paper-making machine (1805), a machine for automatically printing bank notes with sequential serial numbers (1806), and a machine for making quill pen nibs (1809). He also patented the first extrusion process for making lead pipes and also machinery for making gun stocks (Patent No. 2652).

His greatest contribution to engineering was his insistence on quality control. He realised that for engines to succeed, they would have to be machined to a better standard than was the practice. He taught the Cornish engineer Arthur Woolf to machine engines to a close tolerance. This enabled Cornish engines to run with high-pressure steam, vastly increasing their output. Woolf became the leading Cornish steam engineer and his designs were adopted by all the engine designers of the day. The 15-HP engines of Watt and others of circa 1800 gave way to 450-HP engines by 1835. Bramah can be viewed as a founding father in industrial quality control.

== Death and legacy ==
One of Bramah's last inventions was a hydrostatic press capable of uprooting trees. This was put to work at Holt Forest in Hampshire. While superintending this work Bramah caught a cold, which developed into pneumonia. He died at Holt Forest on 9 December 1814. He was buried in the churchyard of St Mary on Paddington Green Church.

The historian Ian Mortimer summarises Bramah thus:

“Joseph Bramah – that blessing of a genius who gives us the modern flushing loo – is also the inventor of the beer pump. Few people in history can claim to have done so much for our physical comfort – both in filling ourselves up at one end and in emptying ourselves at the other.”

The Brazilian Brahma beer brand is named for him. In 2006, a pub in Barnsley town centre was opened named the Joseph Bramah in his memory.

== Patents ==
Bramah was a prolific inventor, and obtained 18 patents for his designs between 1778 and 1812.

1778
Flushing toilet (Pat. No. 1177)
21 August 1784
Bramah lock (Pat. No. 1430)
9 May 1785
Beer pump
1785
Hydrostatical machine and boiler, propelling vessels, carriages, etc. (Pat. No. 1478)
1790
Rotary engines (with Thomas Dickinson) (Pat. No. 1720)
1793
Fire engines (Pat. No. 1948)
Beer engines and brewing (Pat. No. 2196)
1795
Hydraulic press (Pat. No. 2045)
1796
First Pumper Fire Truck
1798
Locks (Pat. No. 2232)
1802
A planing machine for making gun stocks (Pat. No. 2652)
1805
Improvements to paper manufacture and printing (Pat. No. 2840)
1806
Printing and numbering of banknotes (Pat. No. 2957)
Improvements to paper manufacture and printing (Pat. No. 2977)
1809
Pens (Pat. No. 3260)
Carriages (Pat. No. 3270)
1812
Public water mains and high-pressure hydraulic mains (Pat. No. 3611)
Carriages (Pat. No. 3616)
