= Bramah lock =

Mechanical fastening device

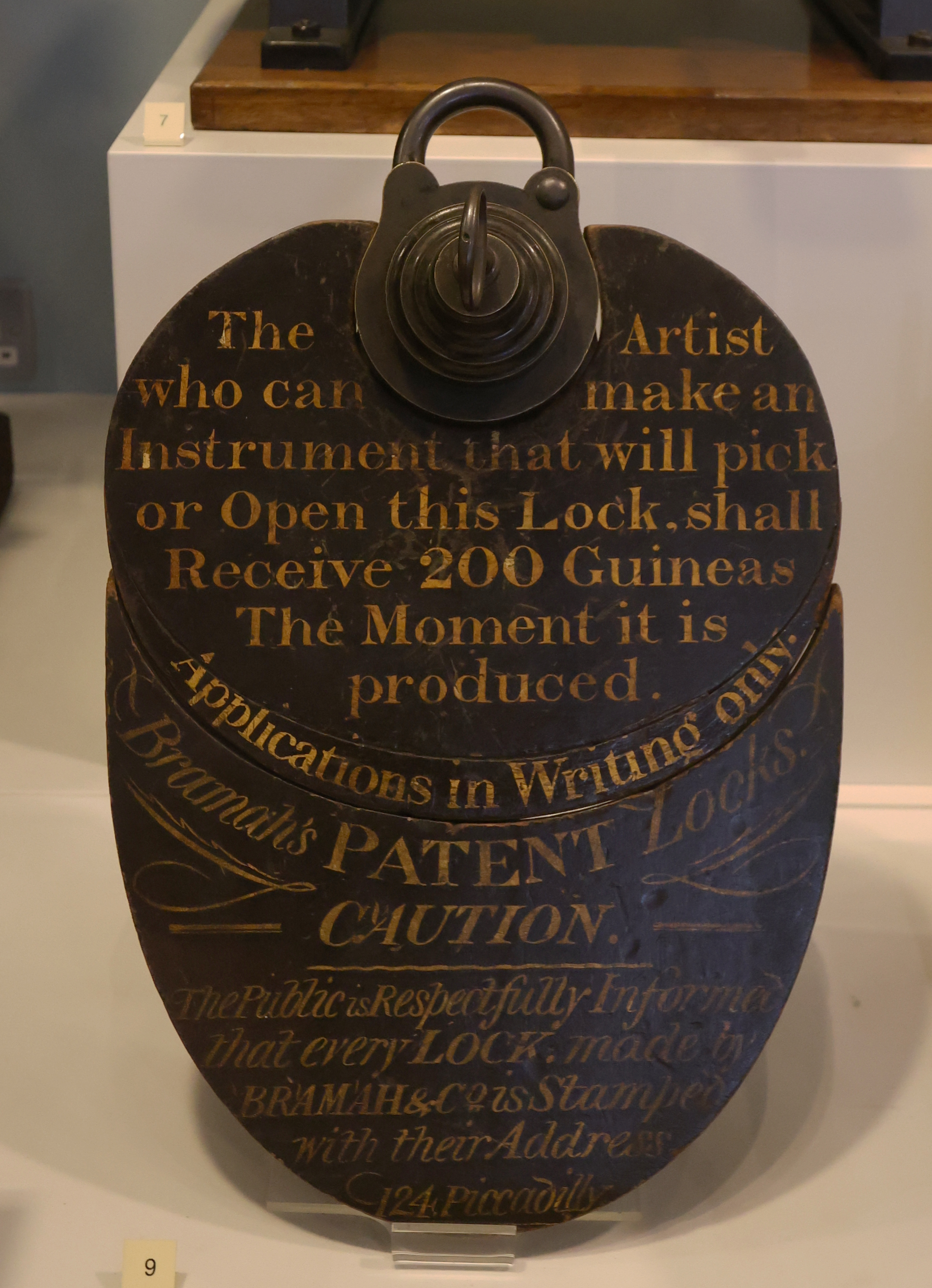
The Bramah challenge lock

The Bramah lock was created by Joseph Bramah in 1784. The lock employed the first known high-security design.

== History ==
After attending some lectures on technical aspects of locks, Bramah designed a lock of his own, receiving a patent for it in 1784. In the same year, he started the Bramah Locks company at 124 Piccadilly, London.

The locks produced by his company were famed for their resistance to lock picking and tampering, and the company famously had a "challenge lock" displayed in the window of their London shop from 1790, mounted on a board containing the inscription:

The artist who can make an instrument that will pick or open this lock shall receive 200 guineas the moment it is produced.

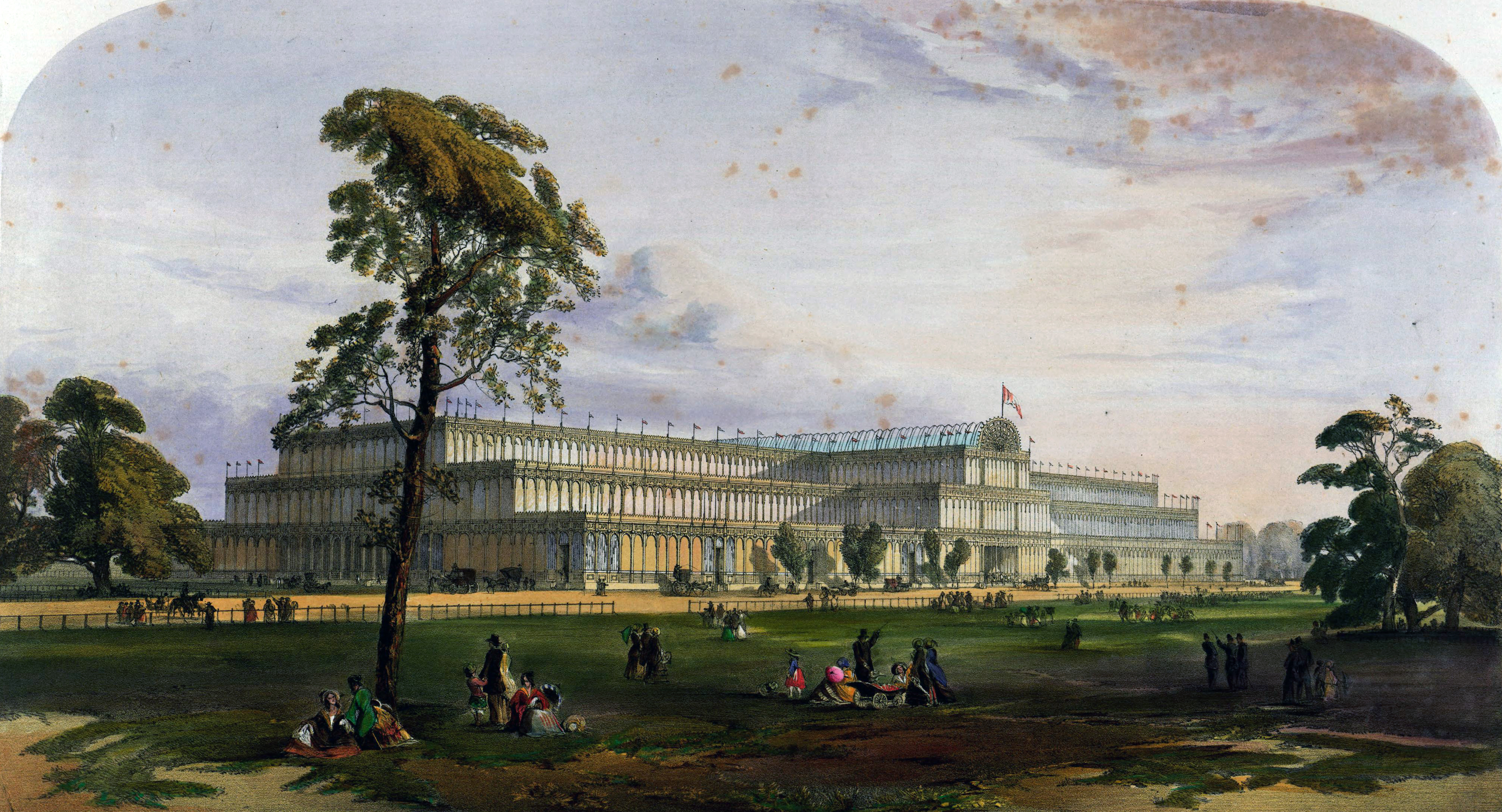
The Great Exhibition 1851

The challenge stood for over 67 years until, at the Great Exhibition of 1851, the American locksmith Alfred Charles Hobbs was able to open the lock and, following some argument about the circumstances under which he had opened it, was awarded the prize. Hobbs' attempt required about 51 hours, spread over 16 days.

The Challenge Lock is in the Science Museum in London. An examination of the lock shows that it has been rebuilt since Hobbs picked it. Originally it had 18 iron slides and 1 central spring; it now has 13 steel slides, each with its own spring.

Bramah received a second patent for a lock design in 1798.

== Design ==
The Bramah lock used a cylindrical key and keyhole, as does the current lock. The end of the key has a number of slots of different depths which, when inserted into the lock and pressed against spring tension, would depress a number of wafers to a specified depth and enable the key to turn and open the lock. The original shared some similarities with a modern tubular pin tumbler lock, but used fixed wafers instead of two-part pins. The original Bramah lock had 18 different wafers, which allowed for 470 million possible permutations.

The lock's innovative design presented a unique engineering challenge to create tools capable of making the different parts involved. Bramah worked extensively with an engineer named Henry Maudslay to create a number of different machine tools for working with the cylindrical key and lock.

== Location ==
As of 2007, the Bramah company was based in Fitzrovia, London and Romford, Essex. Though no longer thought to be completely unpickable, the venerable design is still sold as a very secure lock.
