= Flushing trough =

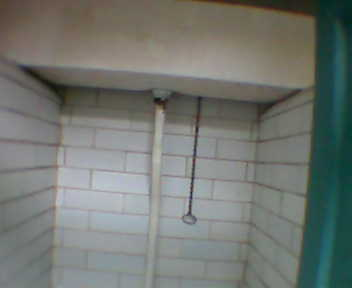
A flushing trough

A flushing trough is a long cistern which serves several toilet pans. It is designed to allow a shorter interval between flushes than individual cisterns.

Flushing troughs were commonly used in places such as schools, colleges, public toilets, factories and public buildings where repeated use of the flushing cistern was required in a short period of time. Such troughs were used by local councils in the UK into the 1980s.

== Background ==
Water byelaws in the United Kingdom restricted the volume of water that could be used to flush WCs and urinals. Water boards typically required valveless siphonic cisterns that were designed to be "water waste preventers": these deliver a fixed volume of water on every flush and do not allow water to run into a WC pan continuously. A typical siphonic cistern is emptied completely when it is flushed, and can only be flushed again once it has refilled: the delay between flushes was found to be inconvenient in busy lavatories such as those in schools, factories or public conveniences. The flushing trough was designed to overcome this delay by allowing a fixed volume of water to be discharged from a larger cistern.

== Development ==
The flushing trough was developed by Adamsez Limited and a patent was issued to MJ Adams in 1912 for a flushing trough that used the bell siphon flushing system. A further patent was issued in 1928 to AH Adams for a flushing trough that used the plate siphon mechanism, marketed as the 'Epic'. Advertisements by Adamsez stated that 25,000 were in use by 1939. Rival manufacturer Shanks obtained a patent for a modified version in 1935 which they marketed as the 'Alisa'.

== Design ==
The mechanism of a flushing trough: pulling the flush chain (1) rocks the flush lever (2) and lifts the siphon plate (3), forcing water over the top of the siphon (4) and starting the flush. Water is sucked through a connecting pipe (5) from the timing box (6) and air enters the timing bottle through the vent pipe (7) until the box is empty and air flows into the siphon through (5), breaking the siphonic action and ending the flush. The timing box rapidly refills through a hole (8).

Flushing trough cisterns were usually made of cast iron or galvanised steel, but were also manufactured in fireclay and plastic, and could serve 2 or more toilets. The trough would typically span a row of cubicles, with an individual siphon and flush chain for each closet. The lever arm connecting the siphon plate to the flush chain was often fixed directly to a pivot on the siphon rather than the cistern, so the arrangement of the siphons was highly flexible: flush pipes could be fitted in the middle or side of the cubicles; flush chains could be arranged at the back or front of the trough, or through the bottom of the trough via a standpipe. Flushing troughs could also be concealed in ducts behind the wall of a range of WCs, with the flush chains linked to flush levers. Although flushing troughs generally proved reliable, a key disadvantage is that repair of one siphon requires all WCs served by the trough to be out of service.

=== Operation ===
Each siphon in a flushing trough is connected to its own timing box by a pipe. Siphonic action is started in the same way as an ordinary flushing cistern. As the water is siphoned from the trough, water is also sucked from the timing box and the water level inside the box falls rapidly, with air drawn into the timing box through a 'snorkel' vent pipe. When the timing box has been emptied of water, air flows through the timing box and into the siphon to break the siphonic action, stopping the flush. The timing box quickly refills with water through a hole in its side. The siphon is then ready to flush again.

Up to seven siphons would be supplied by a single ballcock, which would refill the trough whenever the water level fell.

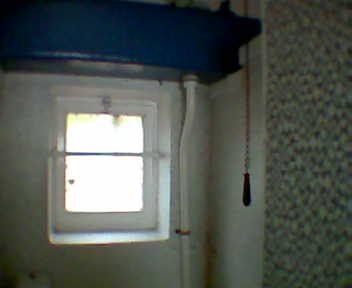
An older trough from the 1930s. Note that the chain hangs over the front and not the back.

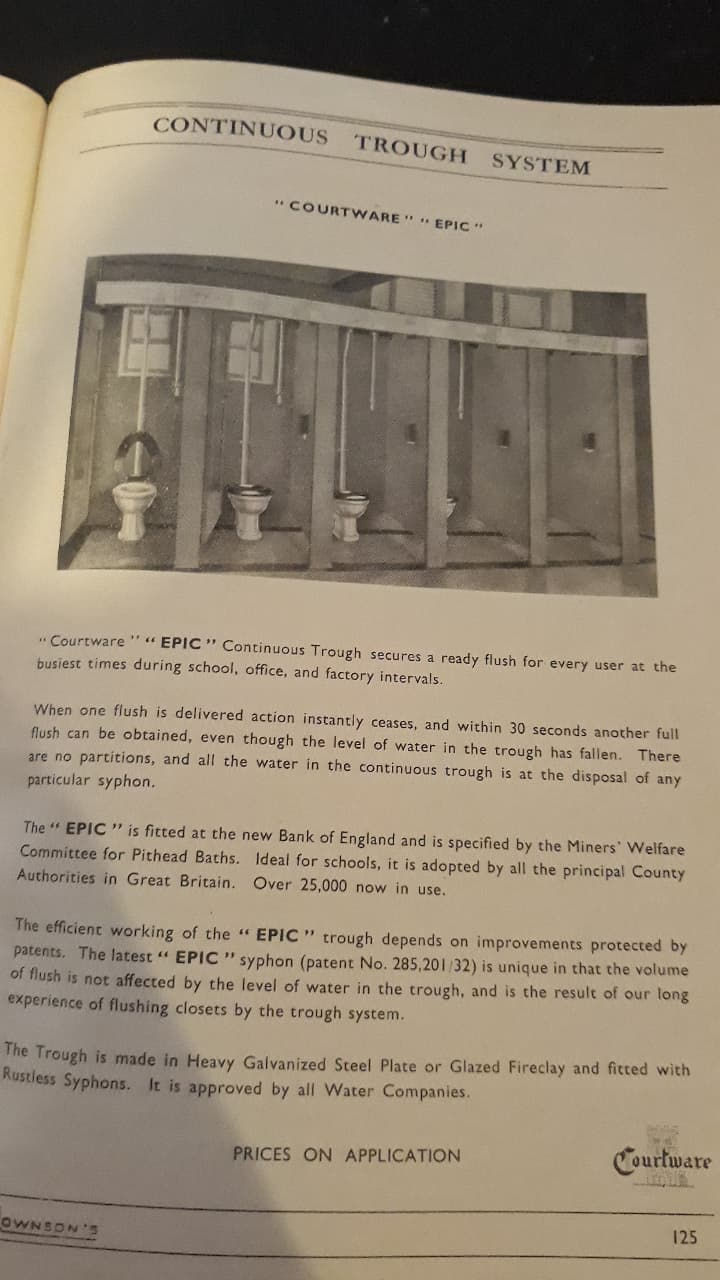
Advertisement for flushing trough from 1939

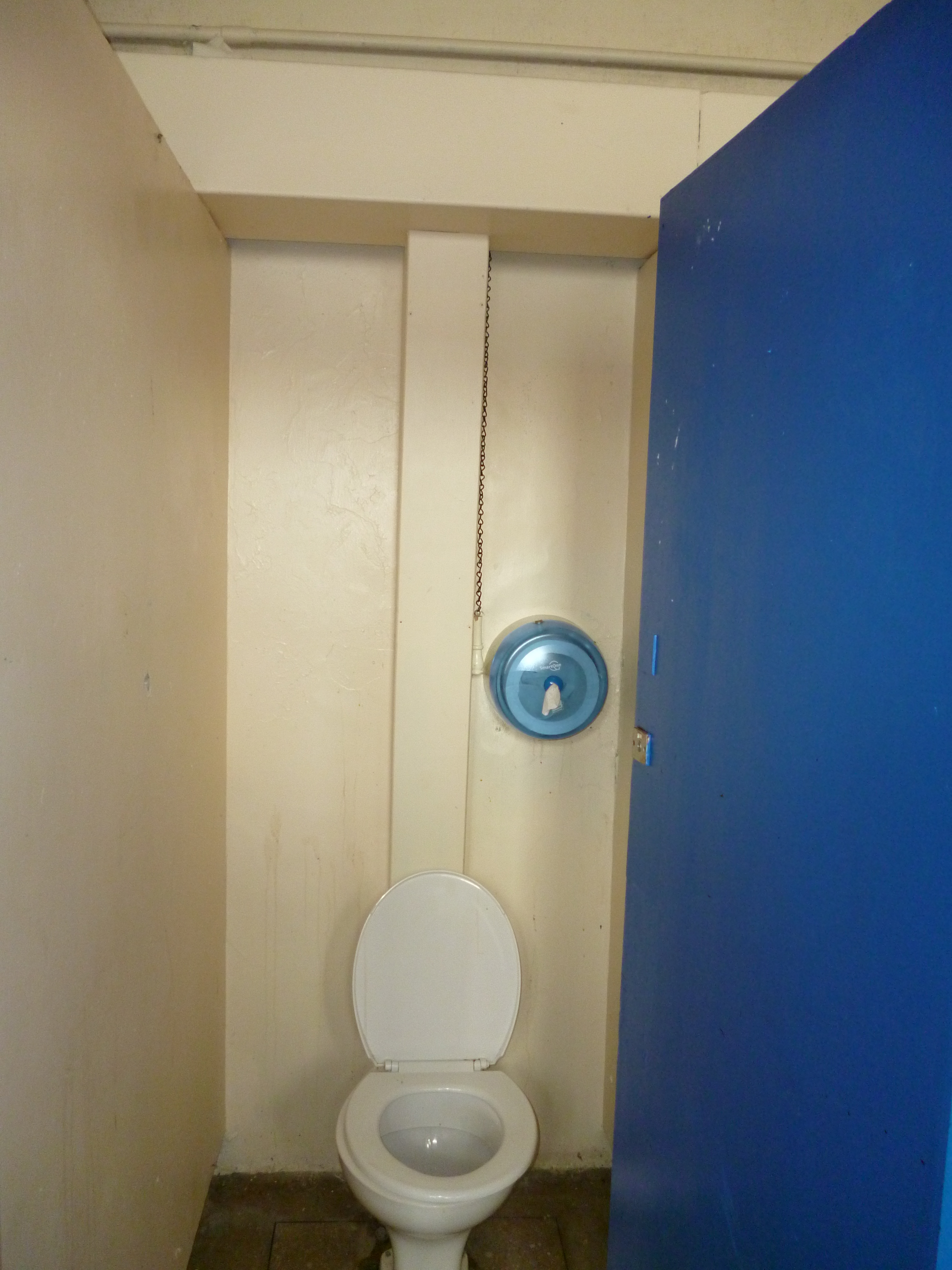
A trough that can still be found in Plymouth, Devon, UK
