= Alfred Charles Hobbs =

American locksmith and inventor (1812-1891)

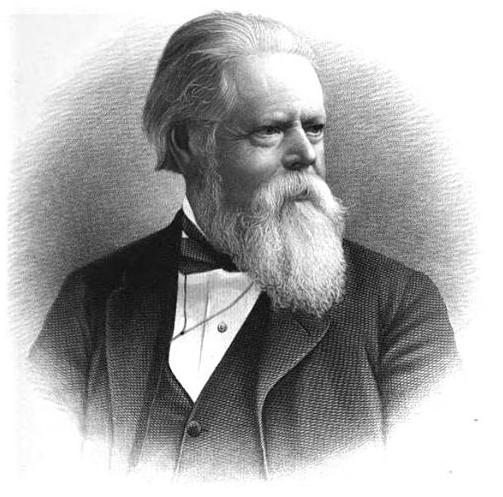
- Born: October 7, 1812; Boston, Massachusetts
- Died: November 6, 1891 (aged 79 years)
- Parent: John L. Hobbs

Alfred Charles Hobbs (October 7, 1812 – November 6, 1891) was an American locksmith and inventor. He was born in Boston, Massachusetts, in 1812; his father was a carpenter. He married Charlotte F. Nye (1815-?) of Sandwich, Massachusetts, in 1835 and had four children: Charlotte Hobbs, Alfred J. Hobbs (1843-?), Mary H. Hobbs, and Arthur Hobbs. Both of his parents were born in England.

== Life ==
"Rogues are very keen in their profession, and know already much more than we can teach them."

— Alfred Charles Hobbs in 1853 when questioned on the wisdom of publishing the weaknesses of existing locks.

Hobbs went to London as a representative of the New York company of Day & Newell, which was exhibiting at the Great Exhibition of 1851. Hobbs had brought with him his boss's (Robert Newell) Parautoptic lock, designed to compete with, and surpass, the locks available at the time in Britain. He was the first one to pick Bramah's lock and the Chubb detector lock at the Great Exhibition of 1851, and so forced lock manufacturers to improve their designs.

The lock controversy continues a subject of great interest at the Crystal Palace, and, indeed, is now become of general importance. We believed before the Exhibition opened that we had the best locks in the world, and among us Bramah and Chubb were reckoned quite as impregnable as Gibraltar— more so, indeed, for the key to the Mediterranean was taken by us, but none among us could penetrate into the locks and shoot the bolts of these masters. The mechanical spirit, however, is never at rest, and if it is lulled into a false state of listlessness in one branch of industry, and in one part of the world, elsewhere it springs up suddenly to admonish and reproach us with our supineness. Our descendants on the other side of the water are every now and then administering to the mother country a wholesome filial lesson upon this very text, and recently they have been "rubbing us up" with a severity which perhaps we merited for sneering at their shortcomings in the Exhibition.

In 1854 he was awarded a Telford Medal by the Institution of Civil Engineers for his paper 'On the Principles and Construction of Locks'.

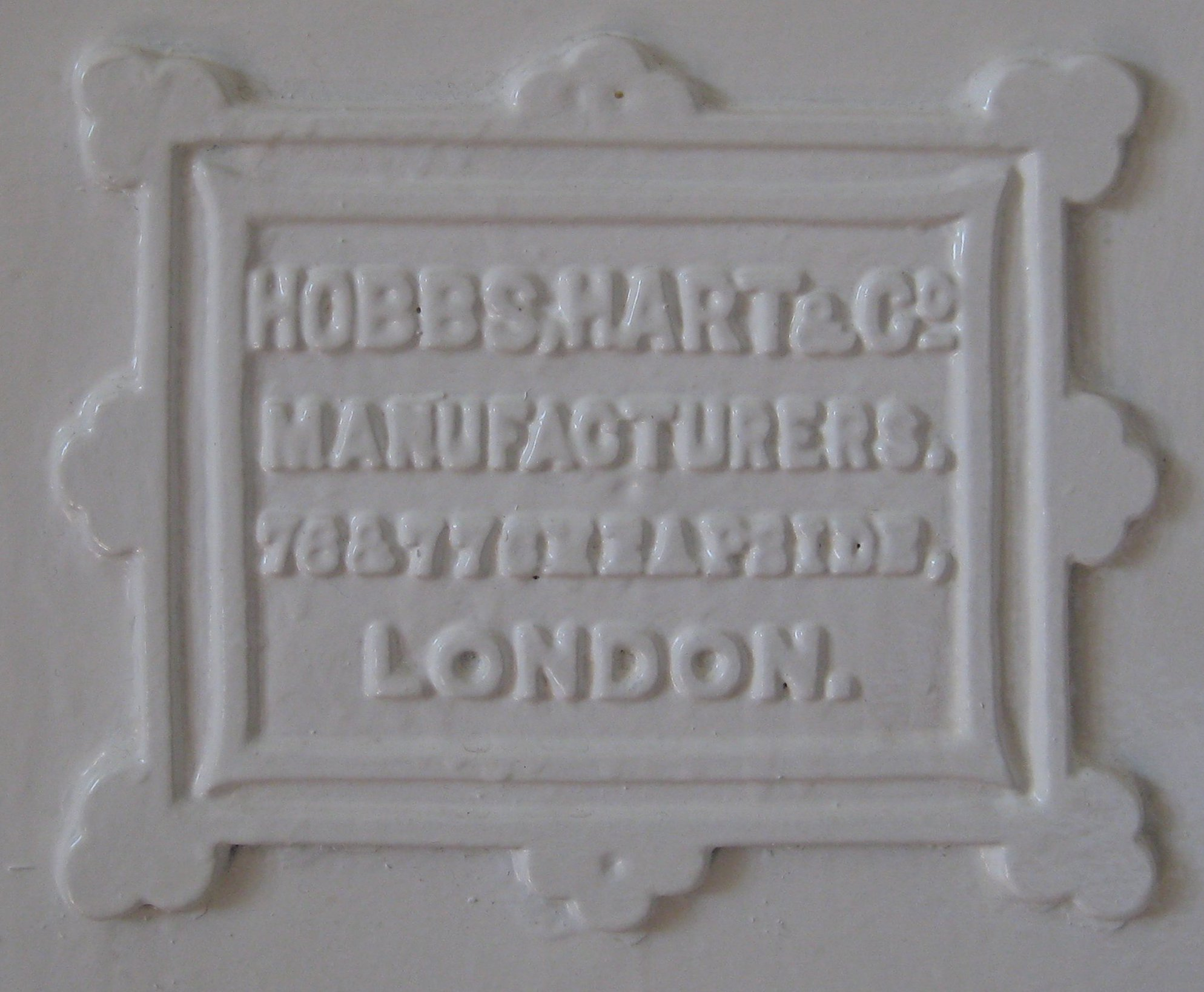
Sign on a strong room door.

Hobbs became one of the founders of the lock making firm of Hobbs Hart & Co. Ltd. The company started in 1851 and was formally registered as Hobbs and Co. in 1852. By 1855, it had become Hobbs, Ashley and Company. The name then changed to Hobbs, Ashley and Fortescue, with at 97 Cheapside in London, an address it kept for 90 years.

In 1860 Hobbs returned to America and lived in Bridgeport, Connecticut, and went on to hold a dozen patents for firearm ammunition manufacturing. In 1880 he listed himself as a "Superintendent Of Cartridge Factory".

== Publications ==
- Locks and Safes: The Construction of Locks. Published by Virtue & Co., London, 1853 (revised 1868)

== Patents ==
- U.S. patent 137,773 Improvements in Machines for Winding Wads April 15, 1873
- U.S. patent 135,913 Improvements in Cartridge Loading Machines February 18, 1873

== See also ==
- Protector lock

== Bibliography ==
- The Stevens Point Journal; December 26, 1891; The late Alfred Charles Hobbs.
- Fitchburg Daily Sentinel; December 29, 1891; ... Alfred C. Hobbs, noted lockmaker, aged 79
- Daily Northwestern; Oshkosh; January 2, 1892; ... Alfred C. Hobbs, noted lockmaker, Bridgeport, Connecticut, aged 79 ...
