= Alliance for Water Efficiency =

Nonprofit organization

The Alliance for Water Efficiency is a stakeholder-based 501(c)(3) nonprofit organization dedicated to the efficient and sustainable use of water. The organization serves as a North American advocate for water-efficient products and programs, and provides information and assistance on water conservation efforts. The organization's activities include advocacy, research, and training. The organization received early support from the U.S. Environmental Protection Agency.

== Member organizations ==
The Alliance's network of members includes over 500 stakeholders (including IAPMO, Kohler Company, Metropolitan Water District of Southern California, Rain Bird, Southern Nevada Water Authority, and TOTO USA) working to improve water efficiency and conservation nationwide.

== Awards ==
- U.S. Environmental Protection Agency WaterSense Excellence Award for Strategic Collaboration--2012, 2017, 2018, 2019, 2021, 2023, and 2024
- U.S. Water Alliance, U.S. Water Prize, 2014
- Universities Council on Water Resources, Education and Public Service Award, 2009

== See also ==
- Water Efficiency
- Water Conservation
- Water Supply and Sanitation in the United States
