= Residential water use in the U.S. and Canada =

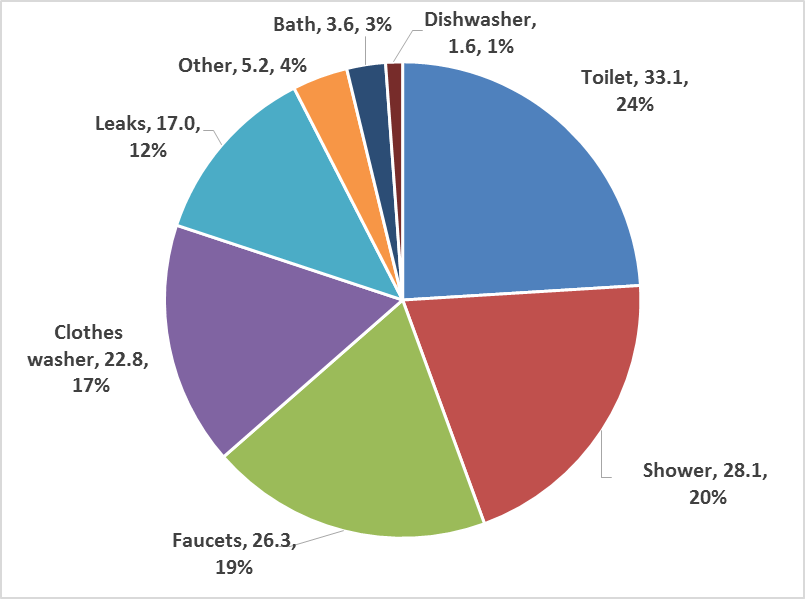
End uses of water for households in the U.S. in gallons per household per day and percent of indoor use

Residential water use (also called domestic use, household use, or tap water use) includes all indoor and outdoor uses of drinking quality water at single-family and multifamily dwellings. These uses include a number of defined purposes (or water end uses) such as flushing toilets, washing clothes and dishes, showering and bathing, drinking, food preparation, watering lawns and gardens, and maintaining swimming pools. Some of these end uses are detectable (and measurable) while others are more difficult to gauge.

== Water use measurement ==
The approximate average quantities of water applied toward specific purposes have to be estimated because only total use of residential customers is metered and recorded for time periods of one month or longer (although the AMR and advance metering infrastructure (AMI) technologies allow for more frequent readings). In the United States, a nationwide compilation of these metered quantities by the United States Geological Survey (USGS) shows average domestic water deliveries (for both indoor and outdoor purposes) by public water suppliers to single-family and multifamily dwellings were about 89 U.S. gallons (340 liters) per person per day in 2010 and 83 U.S. gallons (310 liters) in 2015. Since early 1980s, the increasing public interest in water conservation prompted questions about consumers’ water-using behaviors and measurement of average quantities of water applied to each domestic purpose. In mid-1990s, the first national study of residential end uses of water was conducted in the U.S. acquiring high resolution data directly from the customer's water meter and analyzing flow traces to assign each measured water-using event to a specific end use. Several detailed studies of domestic end uses of water in North America and elsewhere followed. In 2016, an update study of residential end uses of water, sponsored by the Water Research Foundation (WRF) was completed and is the most current source of data on the various purposes of residential water use described here.

== Indoor use and end uses ==
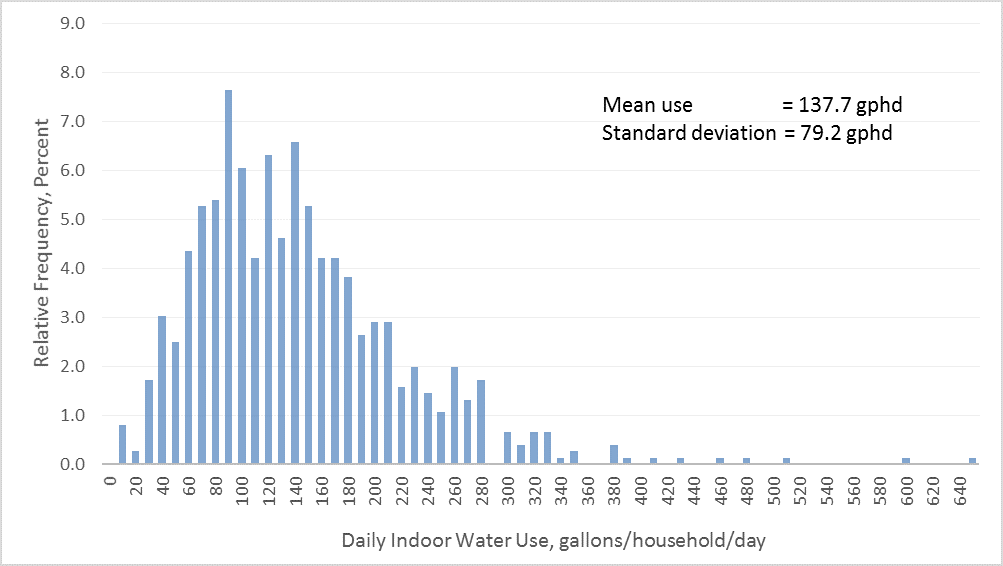
Distribution of average daily indoor water use across 762 households in the U.S. and Canada - Based on Water Research Foundation study

Indoor water use includes water flows through fixtures and appliances inside the house. The average daily indoor water use per household (averaging 2.65 people in the North American sample) ranged from zero to 644 gphd (gallons per household per day) and averaged 138 gphd, with standard deviation of about 80 gphd (or 521 liters per day and standard deviation of 300 liters). The equivalent average use per person is 52.1 gpcd (gallons per capita per day) or 197 liters per capita per day. Because the distribution of indoor use in the sample of homes is positively skewed, a more appropriate measure of central tendency is the median, which is about 125 gphd (or 472 lphd). Toilet flushing is the largest indoor use of water, followed by flows through kitchen and bathroom faucets, showers, clothes washers, leaks, bathtubs, other/miscellaneous uses, and dishwashers. Since the late 1990s, total indoor use has decreased by 22 percent, primarily due to the improved water efficiency of clothes washers and toilets, among other low-flow fixtures.

=== Toilet flushing ===
On average, toilets are flushed 5 times a day per person and represent the single highest use of water in the average home. Toilet flushing makes up about 24% of overall household water consumption (at average daily volume of 33.1 gphd or 125 lphd). Currently, the average flushing volume for all sampled toilets is 2.6 gallons per flush (gpf) (or 9.8 liters per flush (lpf)). Future reduction in toilet end use will occur as more homes use low-flush toilets (1.6 gpf, or 6 lpf) mandated by the 1992 Energy Policy Act, or high efficiency toilets (1.28 gpf or 4.85 lpf) which meet the EPA WaterSense specifications. A recent study shows that about 21 percent of all toilets in 5 states (Arizona, California, Colorado, Georgia and Texas) have a flushing volume that exceeds 1.6 gallons/flush.

=== Showering ===
In an average home, showering is the second largest water use after toilets. The average shower uses 15.8 U.S. gallons (60 liters) and lasts for 7.7 minutes at average flow rate of 2.1 gallons per minute (gpm) (7.9 liters per minute). On average, in a household of average size (2.65 persons) 12.4 showers are taken each week. For comparison, a navy shower lasts only 2 minutes and can use less than 3 U.S. gallons (11 liters) of water. The most water-frugal approach is used by the crew of the International Space Station (ISS) who use less than 1 U.S. gallon (3.8 liters) to bathe. For showerheads, the standard for maximum flow rate continues to be 2.5 gallons per minute (gpm) (9.4 liters per minute (lpm)) as set by the Energy Policy Act of 1992. However, manufacturers now offer ultra-efficiency showerheads with maximum flow rate below 2.0 gpm (7.6 lpm). Examples include a showerhead with flow rate of 1.75 gpm (6.61 lpm) at high water pressure and 1.45 gpm (5.48 lpm) at low pressure, or a showerhead with three pressure compensated flow rates (by non-removable pressure compensator) with options of 0.5, 1.0 and 1.5 gpm (1.9, 3.8, 5.7 lpm). A widespread use of more efficient showerheads (with flow rates of 1.6 gpm) would reduce average water use for showering by 2 gphd (7.6 lphd)(or by 8 percent).

=== Baths ===
In addition to showering, baths were recorded in 47 percent of the sampled households in which 2.7 baths were taken each week (or, on average, 1.3 per week across all sampled households). Each bath uses on average 20.2 gallons (or 76.5 liters) of water.

=== Faucet flows ===
Water flowing through opened faucets (including kitchen, bathroom, utility sink faucets, and hose bibs) accounts for 19 percent (26.3 gphd, or 100 lphd) of total indoor water use in an average household where faucets are used 51 times per day. On average, faucets are opened for 30 seconds at a flow of 1 gpm (gallons per minute) and an average discharge of 0.5 U.S. gallons (1.9 liters) per each use.

=== Clothes washing ===
Washing laundry is a significant use of water in the average home, accounting for 17% of the average indoor use. The average size family washes 5.4 loads of laundry each week. Each load uses on average 29.3 U.S. gallons (111 liters) of water. According to EPA, a full-sized Energy Star certified clothes washer (with "water factor" - WF ≤ 8.0 gal/cycle/ft^3) should use on average 15 U.S. gallons (57 liters) of water per load, compared to at least two times that volume used by a standard machine. Currently, about one fourth of American homes use less than 20 U.S. gallons (76 liters) per load, with the average volume of 31 U.S. gallons (120 liters) per load.

=== Indoor leaks ===
Leaks, or flows of water without a discernible purpose, were observed in nearly 90 percent of monitored homes. The loss of water through leaks accounted for 12 percent of average indoor water use. Estimated loss of water in average household is 6,200 U.S. gallons (23,000 liters) per year. Common types of leaks include running toilets, slow-leaking toilet flappers, partially opened or dripping faucets, and other cracked or open supply lines. While all observed leaks are included in indoor use, some leaks could occur on outdoor bibs or water features.

=== Dish washing ===
Dishes can be washed by hand in a sink or in an automatic dishwasher (DW), which was present in 84 percent of the end use study homes. The average American family washes approximately 1.8 dishwasher loads each week. The average water volume per load was 6.1 gpl (23 lpl) and dishwashers accounted for about 1 percent of total indoor use. The EPA's Energy Star Most Efficient 2017 dishwashers use 2.4 to 3.2 gallons (or 9 to 12 liters) per cycle.

== Variability of water usage ==
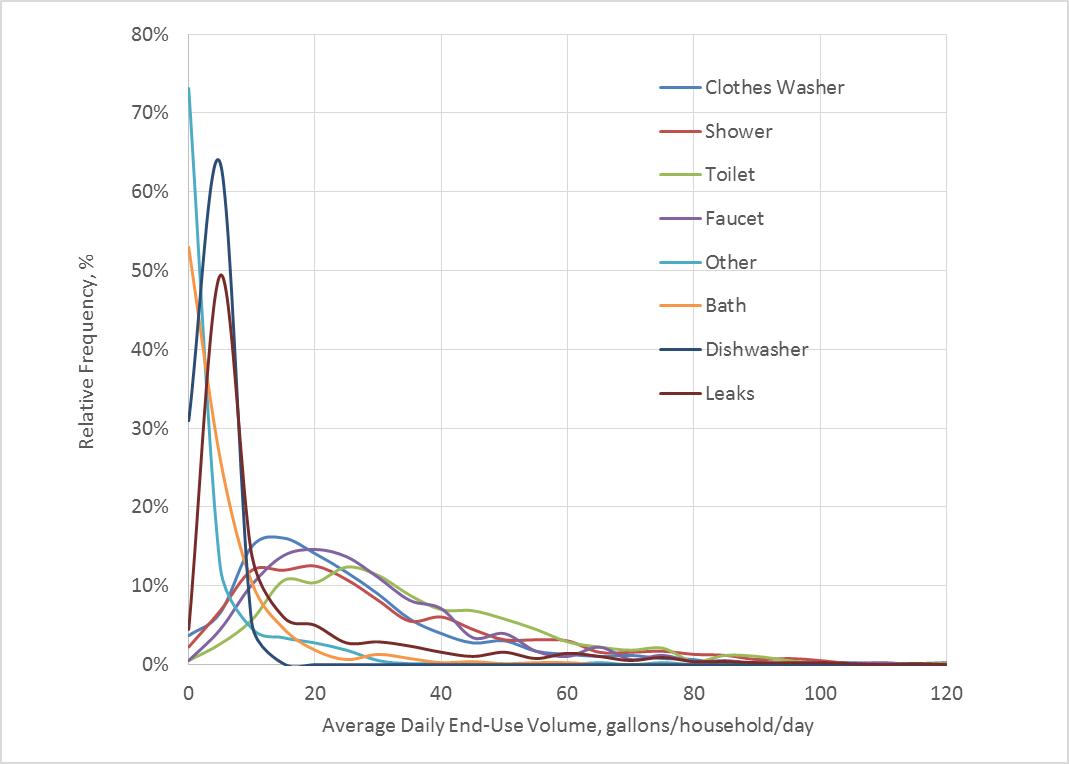
Distribution of average end use volumes across 762 households in the U.S. and Canada - Based on Water Research Foundation study

Residential indoor water use can vary considerably across households depending on the number of residents (or more specifically, on the size and family composition of each household) and other circumstances (both systematic and random). It also depends on the contribution of the various domestic purposes of water use to the variability of total indoor use. The distributions of the observed average daily volumes for eight major end uses of water also shows considerable variability and a skew toward the right hand tails of the distributions (the data on the figure with distributions of end use volumes are truncated at 120 gpd to enhance the separation of the distribution graphs; in order to include all observations within the right tail of the distributions would require extending the horizontal scale to 560 gpd (to capture the maximum observed volumes of 553 gphd for leaks, 345 gphd for faucets and 223 gphd for toilets). Among the eight indoor end uses, five (i.e., leaks, toilet flushing, showering, clothes washing and faucet use) show pronounced right skew in their distributions that contributes to the “fatter” and longer right-hand tail in total indoor use. Significant reductions in some end uses of water could be achieved not only through the adoption of efficient technologies (i.e., fixtures and appliances) but also through consumers' small behavioral changes to reduce water use and wastage and by eliminating customer side leakage through automated metering and leak alert programs.

== Outdoor use ==
The outdoor residential water use includes landscape irrigation, filling and back washing swimming pools, water used through outdoor faucets (hose bibs) for washing pavement and cars, and other outdoor uses. Annual outdoor use in North American cities differs by climatic region and ranged from 13,000 gallons in Waterloo, Canada to 120,400 gallons in Scottsdale, Arizona. The average outdoor use across 9 sampled cities in the Water Research Foundation study was 50,500 gallons per household per year or 138 gallons per day (524 liters per day). Nearly 17 percent of homes irrigate their landscapes in excess of theoretical irrigation requirement. If excess irrigation could be eliminated, the average outdoor use would drop by 8,200 gallons per house, or by 16 percent.

== See also ==
- Nonresidential water use in the U.S.
- Water conservation
- Drinking water supply and sanitation in the United States
- Water efficiency
- Water waste
- Water use
- Water supply
