= Low-flow fixtures =

A low-flow fixture is a water saving plumbing fixture designed to achieve water savings by having a lower flow rate of water or a smaller quantity per flush. Some of these low-flow fixtures are faucets, showerheads, and toilets. In the United States a maximum water usage of conventional plumbing fixtures was federally mandated by the Energy policy act of 1992. Low-flow fixtures are designed to save water over conventional fixtures by having a lower flow rate while still maintaining satisfactory performance. The Environmental Protection Agency (EPA) WaterSense program has requirements for plumbing fixtures to achieve their definition for water saving low-flow.

== History ==
In the United States, Water efficient low-flow fixtures such as toilets, faucets, and showerheads first became available to consumers in the 1980s. By 1992, 17 states and the district of Columbia had adopted their own water efficiency standards.

The United States Energy Policy Act of 1992 mandated the first maximum water efficiencies for major fixtures in residential and commercial applications. The energy policy EPAct 1992 for residential buildings, restricted toilets to a maximum of 1.6 gpf (Gallons per flush). Kitchen and bathroom faucets were limited to a flow rate of 2.2 gpm (gallons per minute) at 60 psi, and residential shower heads were limited to a flowrate of 2.5 gpm at 80 psi.

In response to an increasing number of water shortages and increased water utility rates there has been recent legislation by many states leading the way in water conservation including Texas, Georgia, New York and California. In response to the historic drought in California, Governor Jerry Brown released Executive order B-29-15 mandating regulations to improve water efficiencies of appliances and fixtures-these new regulations being the most stringent out of any state. The California energy commission approved new maximum flowrates for fixtures sold in California. As of January 1,2016, toilets sold in the state of California must not exceed 1.28 gpf. As of July 1, 2016, bathroom facets sold in California cannot exceed 1.2 gpf. As of July 1, 2018, showerheads cannot exceed 1.8 gpm. California now leads the nation with water use regulations that are more stringent than the requirements of any other state and the EPA's WaterSense requirements.

In the United States, the increase of low-flush toilets in response to the Energy Policy Act of 1992 and other water conservation legislation can be attributed to the saving of 7 billion gallons of water a day-enough water to satiate the water needs of 7 cities the size of New York City.

In 2020, following several speeches in which he complained about low water pressure, then-President Donald Trump directed the DOE to weaken the low-flow rules at the federal level. In 2021, President Joe Biden reversed the change. In 2025, Trump (during his second presidency) reversed it back.

== Low-flow faucets ==
In the United States, conventional kitchen and bathroom faucets must not use more than 2.2 gpm. Faucets that meet energy efficiency standards for WaterSense mustn’t use more than 1.5 gpm, a 32% decrease in flow rate over the federal requirement. Reduced flow faucets often make use of flow restrictors or faucet aerators to reduce the flowrate of the water. Using a faucet with an aerator results in an average 42% reduction in water usage over a conventual faucet with no aerator.

== Low-flush toilets ==
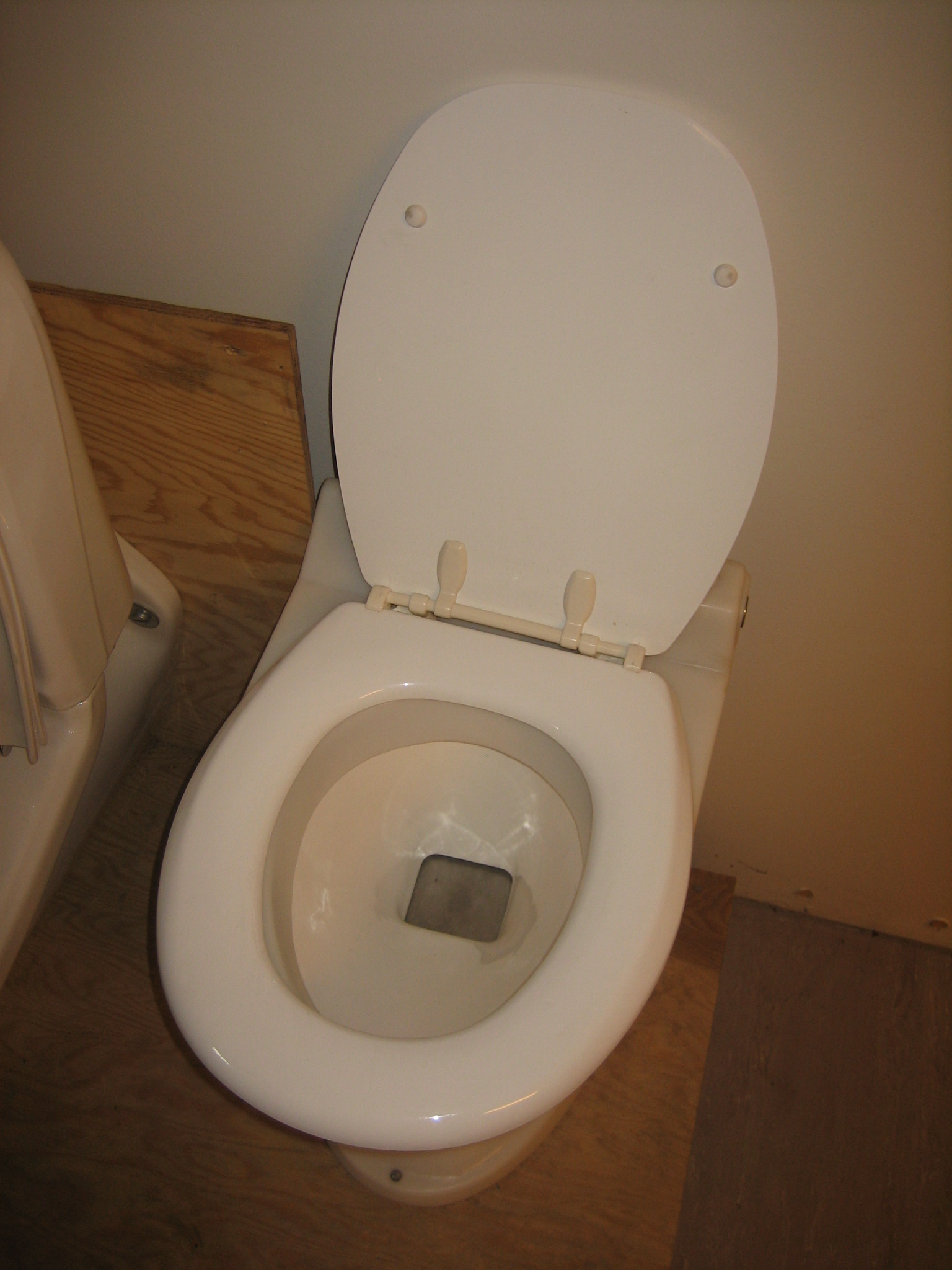
Low-flush toilet (3212351477)

Low-flush toilets use significantly less water per flush than older conventional toilets. In the United States, Older conventional toilet models, typically those built before 1982, can use 5 to 7 gallons of water per flush. Toilets from the era of 1982-1993 may use a somewhat smaller 3.5 gpf. Modern washdown and symphonic variant standard flush toilets in the United States use 1.6 gpf or 6 lpf (liters per flush).

Dual flush systems are widely available allowing 1.6 gpf for solids and 1.1 gpf for liquids. Depending on user behavior, the use of dual-flush toilets potentially saves more water than standard flush toilets. EPA water sense high efficiency certified toilets use 1.28 GPF or less while still providing equal or superior performance to higher water use alternatives.

Other toilet alternatives such as air assisted toilets, and foam-flush toilets use only a small amount of water but are currently not in widespread use. Composting toilets require little to no water but have limitations compared to the conventional toilet.

== Low-flow showerheads ==
In the United States, the conventional showerhead uses 2.5 gallons per minute and the average person in the United States takes an 8-minute shower, an average water consumption of approximately 20 gallons per shower. The installation and usage of water-efficient fixtures may help to save water and provide other benefits such as reducing utility bills. A reduced flow showerhead meeting EPA's WaterSense standards must demonstrate use of no more than 2.0 GPM, which could reduce the water consumption of average family in the United States by 2700 gallons. Some Air assisted ultra-low flow showerheads are able to maintain a satisfactory showering experience while using a much smaller 1.6 gpm.

Another emerging option for the highest level of water saving showerheads are Thermostatic Shut-off Valves (TSV). Showerheads equipped with a TSV will automatically shutoff once the desired temperature is reached, saving the hot water used while waiting for the shower water to warm.

== Problems ==
The increasing trend towards multiple shower head outlets per shower in new construction creates problems for residential water efficiency.

Low-flow kitchen faucets can cause the filling of a pot to take a long time. In addition, performance issues with low-flow faucets often pertain to their ability to properly rinse or wet. In the United States the EPA's WaterSense has established minimum flow rates for lavatory fixtures to ensure satisfaction with low water pressures.

Leaking fixtures can contribute to significant water waste. According to the EPAs WaterSense, a leaky faucet that drips at a rate of one drip per second can waste more than 3,000 gallons of water per year. Old and worn out rubber valve seals in a toilet tank can lead to significant leaks causing the toilet to refill constantly. Some leaky toilets may produce a running water sound that is easy to hear. Other toilet leaks can be silent and intermittent leaving toilets to leak for a long period of time before being detected. The average leaky toilet can waste about 200 gallons of water a day, or over 6,000 gallons per month.

Lowest satisfaction among all low flow fixtures has been found with toilets. When these low flow fixtures first emerged manufactures generally did not make sufficient changes to the design besides reducing the amount of water used. As a result, many early low flow toilets did not remove solid waste very well. However, today there are many low-flow toilets that perform better than the older high flow models.
