= Water efficiency =

Practice of reducing water consumption

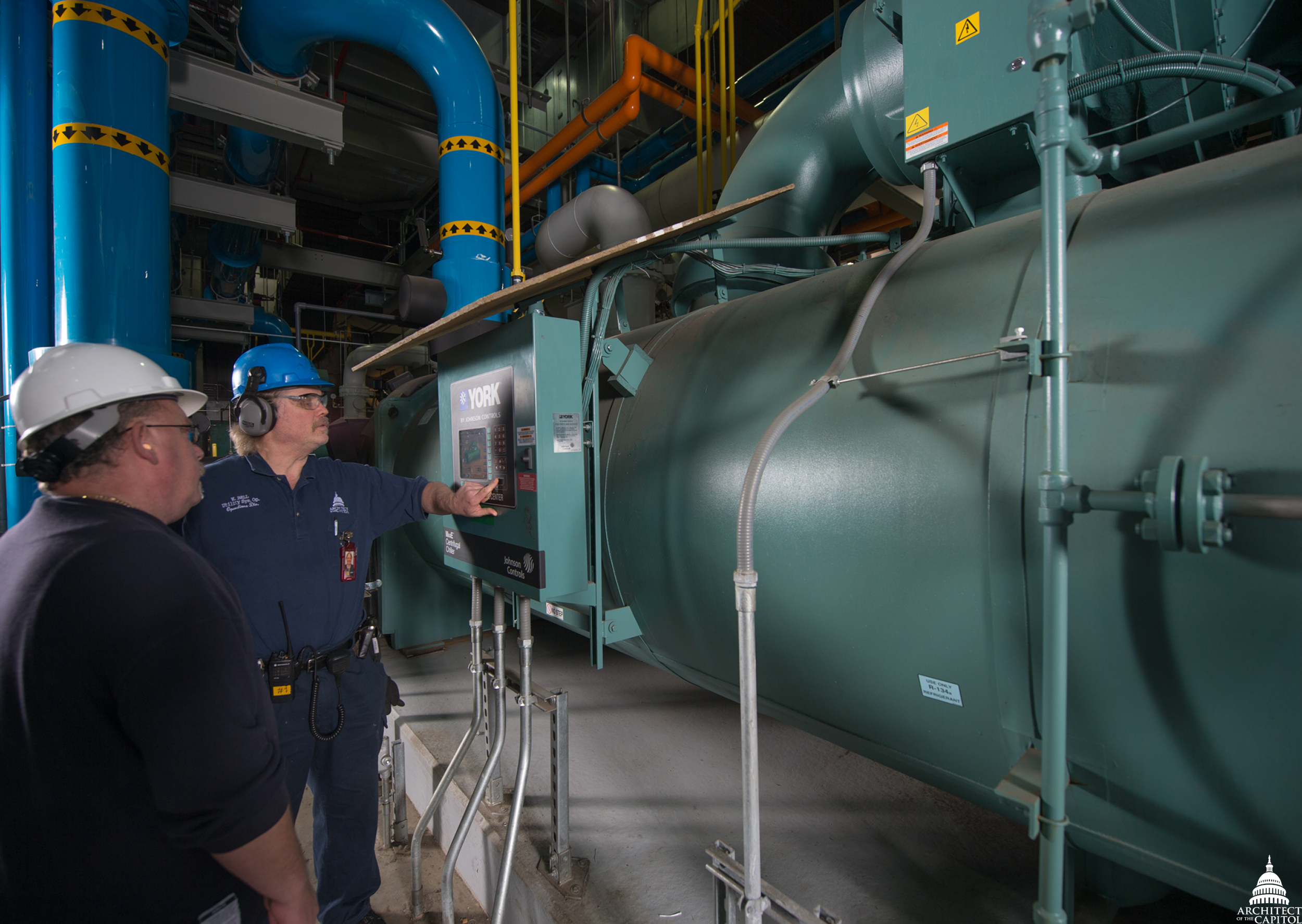
The Capitol Power Plant uses chillers to increase water efficiency

Water efficiency is the practice of reducing water consumption by measuring the amount of water required for a particular purpose and is proportionate to the amount of essential water used. Water efficiency differs from water conservation in that it focuses on reducing waste, not restricting use. Solutions for water efficiency not only focus on reducing the amount of potable water used but also on reducing the use of non-potable water where appropriate (e.g. flushing toilet, watering landscape, etc.). It also emphasizes the influence consumers can have on water efficiency by making small behavioral changes to reduce water wastage, and by choosing more water-efficient products.

== Importance ==
According to the UN World Water Development Report, over the past 100 years, global water use has increased by a factor of six. Annually, the rate steadily increases at an estimated amount of one percent as a result of population increase, economic development and changing consumption patterns. Increasing human demand for water coupled with the effects of climate change mean that the future of water supply is not secure. Around 2 billion people do not have consistent access to safe drinking water. In addition, there are changes in climate, population growth, and lifestyles. The changes in human lifestyle and activities require more water per capita. This creates competition for water among agricultural, industrial, and human consumption.

== Organizations ==
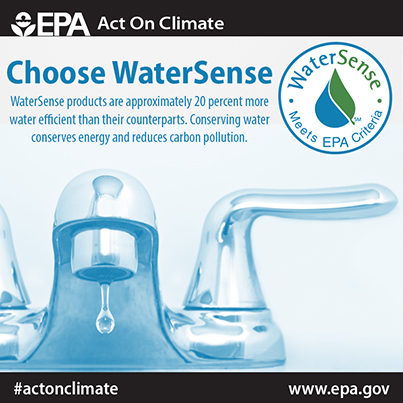
EPA poster publicizing WaterSense products

Many countries recognize water scarcity as a growing problem. Global organizations such as the World Water Council, continue to prioritize water efficiency alongside water conservation.

The Alliance for Water Efficiency, Waterwise, California Water Efficiency Partnership (formally the California Urban Water Conservation Council), Smart Approved WaterMark in Australia, and the Partnership for Water Sustainability in British Columbia in Canada are non-governmental organizations that support water efficiency at national and regional levels.

Governmental organizations such as Environment Canada, the EPA in the USA, the Environment Agency in the UK, DEWR in Australia, have recognized and created policies and strategies to raise water efficiency awareness. The EPA established the WaterSense in 2006. The program is a voluntary program to encourage water efficiency in the United States by identifying and testing products that demonstrate improvement over standard models for toilets, bathroom faucets and faucet accessories, urinals, and residential shower heads through the use of the WaterSense label.

The government of China created a five-year (2010-2015) plan to deliver safe drinking water to about 54 percent of the population by 2015. It would cost about $66 billion US dollars or ¥410 billion Yuan to upgrade about 57,353 miles (92,300 kilometers) of main pipes and water treatment plants. The government hopes these steps will help to better conserve water and meet demands.

The Indian state of Haryana implemented the State Rural Water Policy 2012; under this policy individual household metered connections would be provided to 50% of the rural population by 2017, to stop water wastage in villages.

== Water efficient solutions ==
=== Residential ===
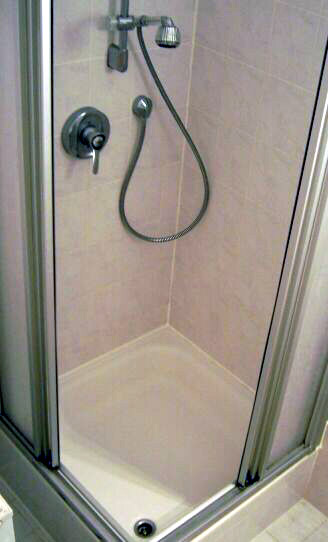
Taking showers instead of baths can save water

Water efficiency solutions in residences include:

- Turning off the faucet sink while brushing teeth — saves approximately five gallons (about 19 liters) of water
- Installing faucet aerators
- Fixing a water valve leakage
- Only running the dishwasher and washing machine with a full load
- Taking a shower instead of a bath
- Washing fruits and vegetables in a bowl rather than continuously running the tap water
- Using leftover water for houseplants
- Using a watering can or garden hose with a trigger nozzle instead of a sprinkler
- Using a bucket and sponge when washing a car rather than a running a hose
- Washing clothes and linens in a washing machine rather than washing them by hand
- Recycling greywater for toilet flushing water and garden use
- Watering outdoor plants in the morning or in the evening when temperatures are cooler

Consumers can voluntarily, or with government incentives or mandates, purchase water-efficient appliances such as low-flush toilets and washing machines.

=== Manufacturers ===
Water efficiency solutions in manufacturing:

- Identifying and eliminating wastage (such as leaks) and inefficient processes (such as continual spray devices on stop-start production lines). This may be the most low-cost area for water savings, as it involves minimal capital outlay. Savings can be made through implementing procedural changes, such as cleaning plant areas with brooms rather than water.
- Changing processes and plant machinery. A retrofit of key plant equipment may increase efficiency. Alternatively, upgrades to more efficient models can be factored into planned maintenance and replacement schedules.
- Reusing wastewater. As well as saving on mains water, this option may improve the reliability of supply, whilst reducing trade waste charges and associated environmental risks.

=== Waterless products ===
- Using waterless car wash products to wash cars, boats, motorcycles, and bicycles. This could save up to 150 U.S. gallons (570 L) of water per wash.

=== Utilities ===
The United States Environmental Protection Agency (EPA) makes the following recommendations for communities and utilities:

- Implementing a water-loss management program (e.g. locate and repair leaks).
- Universal metering.
- Ensuring that fire hydrants are tamperproof.
- Equipment changes — setting a good example by using water-efficient equipment.
- Installing faucet aerators and low-flow shower heads in municipal buildings.
- Replacing worn-out plumbing fixtures, appliances, and equipment with water-saving models.
- Minimizing the water used in space cooling equipment in accordance with the manufacturer's recommendations.
- Shutting off cooling units when not needed.
- Encouraging the use of urinals instead of toilet stalls in school (boys') and work office (men's) restrooms.

Utilities can also modify their billing software to track customers who have taken advantage of various utility-sponsored water conservation initiatives (toilet rebates, irrigation rebates, etc.) to see which initiatives provide the greatest water savings for the least cost.

=== Data centers ===
Water Usage Effectiveness (WUE) is a sustainability metric created by The Green Grid in 2011 to measure the amount of water used by datacenters to cool their IT assets.

== Water policies and impact assessments ==
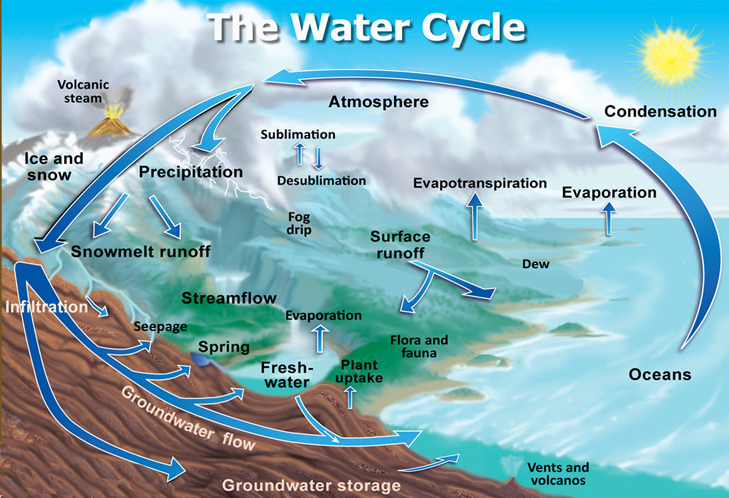
Diagram of the water cycle

Parts-per-million chart of the distribution by volume of water on Earth, each cubelet denoting around 1000 km^{3}

Environmental policies and the difference usages of models that are generated by these enforcement can have significant impacts on society. Hence, improving policies regarding environmental justice issues often require local government's decision-making, public awareness, and a significant amount of scientific tools. Furthermore, it is important to understand that positively impacting policy decisions require more than good intentions, and they necessitate analysis of risk-related information along with consideration of economic issues, ethical and moral principles, legal precedents, political realities, cultural beliefs, societal values, and bureaucratic impediments. Also, ensuring that the rights of people regardless of their age, race, and background are being protected should not be neglected according to "The Role of Cumulative risk Assessment in Decisions about Environmental Justice." If a policy protects the natural environment but negatively affects those who are in the reach of the enforcement of the policy, that policy is subjected to revaluation. Researchers suggest racial and socioeconomic disparities in exposure to environmental hazards describing the demographic composition of areas and their proximity to hazardous sites. Then, any improvements of a social policy and models that are generated by these improvements should reflect the policy-makers' and researchers' environmental justice beliefs. Therefore, researchers and social changes should examine the promises and pitfalls associated with the environmental justice struggles, explore implications of proposed solutions, and recognize the fact that tools necessary to sufficiently carry preceding requirements are underdeveloped.

=== Examples ===
==== Reef Plan (Australia) ====
The Reef Plan began to incorporate new ways to create models that integrate environmental, economical, and social consequences. Pre-existing Australian water policies were often criticized by previous models for investment prioritization and economic dimensions when it came to policy impact assessment. However, the policy makers and researchers in Australia now suggest that "sustainability focused policy requires multi-dimensional indicators" that combine different disciplines. The Reef Plan allows the policy makers to identify issues relating to Reef water quality and implement management strategies and actions to conserve and rehabilitate areas such as riparian zones and wetlands. With the Reef Plan, Nine strategies were implemented in the Great Barrier Reef region. They include self-management approaches, education, and extension, economic incentives, planning for natural resources management and land use, regulatory frameworks, research and information sharing, partnership, priorities and targets, and monitoring and evaluation. And such improvements invoked benefits such as:

1. A more comprehensive picture of the policy impacts. New models projected possible outcomes of different simulations of the proposed policies under various circumstances. In addition, they provided the optimal decisions to be made regarding each outcome through the usage of what is known as computable general equilibrium (CGE) which "integrate dynamics on a catchment scale"
2. Helping the aggregation of both economic aspects of water and non-monetary elements of water usage.
3. Acknowledging the fact that farm production should depend on the global dynamics

==== Conserved Water Statutes (United States) ====
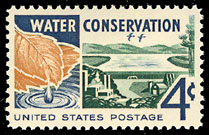
U.S water conservation postal stamp from the 1960s.

Conserved Water Statutes are state laws enacted by California, Montana, Washington, and Oregon to conserve water and allocate water resources to meet the needs of increasing demand for water in the dry lands where irrigation is or was occurring. These laws help the states to dismiss the disincentives to conserve water and do so without damaging pre-existing water rights. Because any extra amount of water after applying water to beneficiaries of the pre-existing water policies does not belong to the appropriators, such a condition creates an incentive to use as much water as possible rather than saving. This obviously causes the costs of irrigation to be greater than the optimal amount which makes the policy very inefficient. However, by enacting Conserved Water Statutes, state legislatures are able to address the disincentives to save water. The policy allows the appropriators to have rights over the surplus water and enforces them to verify their water savings by the water resources department. Out of the four states that adopted the Conserved Water Statutes, Oregon is often renowned to be the most successful. According to "How Expanding The Productivity of Water Rights Could Lessen Our Water Woes," The Oregon Water Resources Department (OWRD) has been a success because a high percentage of submitted applications submitted, and the OWRD serves as a good intermediaries that help appropriators to conserve water. OWRD's programs are not only a success because its effectiveness but also because of their efforts to improve the workers' working conditions. According to OWRD's website, the state policies regarding the water rights are divided into Cultural Competency, Traditional Health Worker, Coordinated Care Organizations, and Race, Ethnicity and Language Data Collection.

==== Water pollution in Malaysia ====
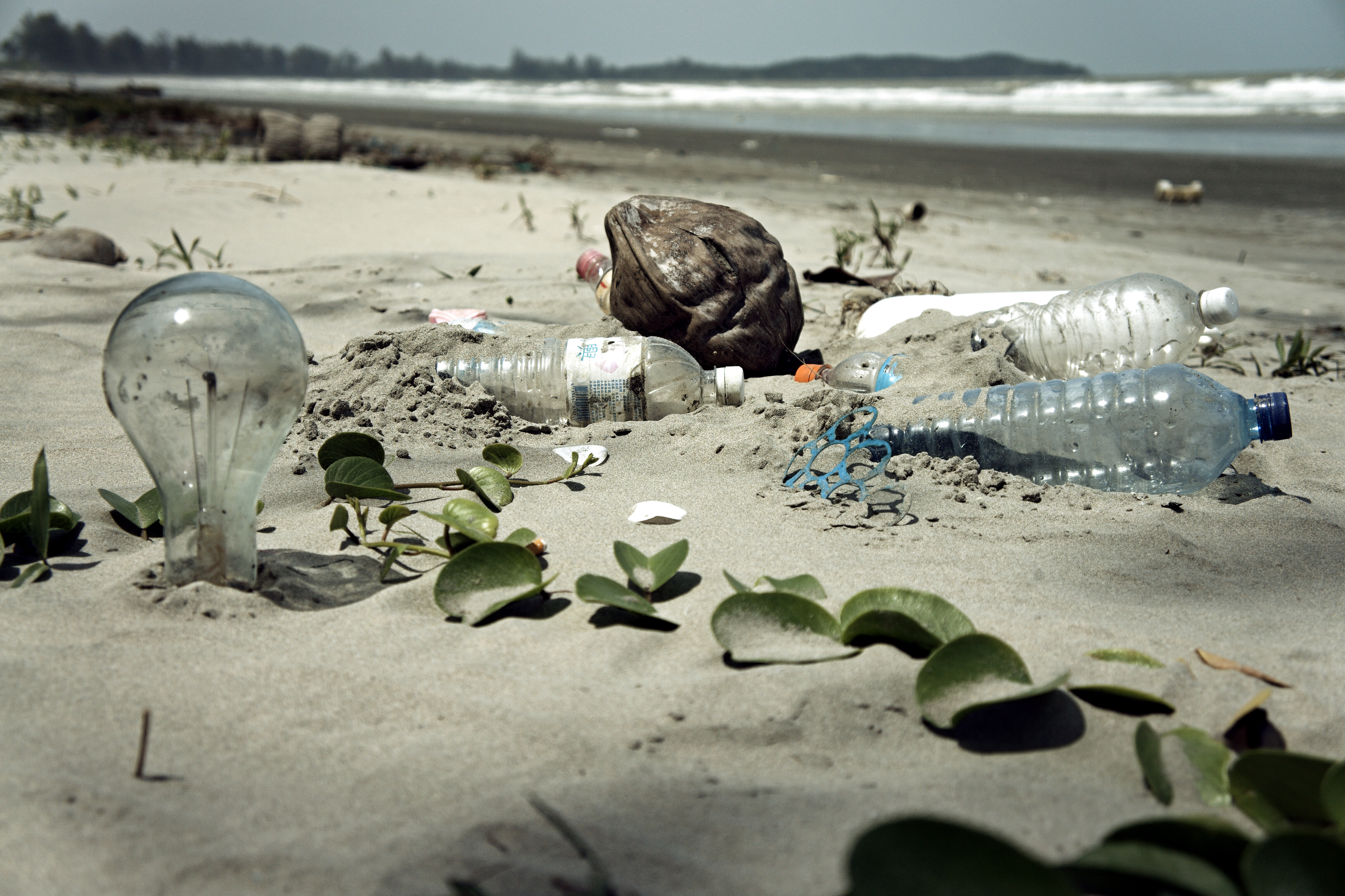
Water pollution with trash disposal of waste at the Garbage Beach

In Malaysia, the citizens have been experiencing harm from water pollutants in the river that have been accumulating over decades due to fast-growing urbanization and industrialization. The planners of Malaysia have been trying to come up with models that indicate the amount of pollutants has grown over time as cities became more industrialized and how these chemicals are distributed in various regions with the usage of econometrics and various scientific tools. Such an attempt is to encourage in-depth researches because sources should be able to analyzed numerically and give economic evaluations while also evaluating the environment. With an abundance of evidence provided by models which reveal the inadequacy of current policies, the Malaysian decision-makers now recognize that appropriate treatments are necessary for regions that are industrialized to protect the residents from water pollutants. As a result, the government seeks to increase public awareness and provide affordable water services to residents by year 2020.

=== Benefits of impact assessments ===
Successful policies and assessments integrate environmental, economical, and social consequences which provide better models and potential future improvements of the policies. Understanding the importance of water policies and impact assessments is a crucial part of both water justice and environmental justice issues. Not only does it help to protect the quality of water but also the quality of living for humans who are directly affected by the environment.

In addition, successful policies go beyond water issues. Beneficial policies that are intended to benefit the general public touch upon subjects such as transportation and other environmental policies that may have a significant impact on the surrounding environment. Instead of mere cost-benefit analysis, decisions are made so that they account for the priorities of the people.

Notable benefits of impact assessments:

- comprehensive picture of the policy impacts. New models projected possible outcomes of different simulations of the proposed policies under various circumstances. In addition, they provided the optimal decisions to be made regarding each outcome through the usage of what is known as computable general equilibrium (CGE) which "integrate dynamics on a catchment scale"
- aggregation of both economics aspects of water and non-monetary elements of water usage.
- acknowledging the fact that farm production should depend on the global dynamics.
- Protection of the human rights of the workers and improvements in working conditions.
- Provision of data that can be analyzed in terms of the economy, health impacts, and recognition of the need for appropriate treatments.

== See also ==
- Deficit irrigation
- Nonresidential water use in the U.S.
- Rainwater collection
- Residential water use in the U.S. and Canada
- Water conservation
- Water resource management
- Tap water
