= Low-flush toilet =

Toilet using a small amount of water to flush

A low-flush toilet (or low-flow toilet or high-efficiency toilet) is a flush toilet that uses significantly less water than traditional high-flow toilets. Before the early 1990s in the United States, standard flush toilets typically required at least 3.5 gallons (13.2 litres) per flush and they used float valves that often leaked, increasing their total water use. In the early 1990s, because of concerns about water shortages, and because of improvements in toilet technology, some states and then the federal government began to develop water-efficiency standards for appliances, including toilets, mandating that new toilets use less water. The first standards required low-flow toilets of 1.6 gallons (6.0 litres) per flush. Further improvements in the technology to overcome concerns about the initial poor performance of early models have further cut the water use of toilets and while federal standards stagnate at 1.6 gallons per flush, certain states' standards toughened up to require that new toilets use no more than 1.28 gallons (4.8 litres) per flush, while working far better than older models. Low-flush toilets include single-flush models and dual-flush toilets, which typically use 1.6 US gallons per flush for the full flush and 1.28 US gallons or less for a reduced flush.

== Water savings ==
According to the Pacific Institute for Studies in Development, Environment, and Security, substantial residential water savings have resulted from the change over time to more efficient toilets. The US Environmental Protection Agency's WaterSense program provides certification that toilets meet the goal of using less than 1.6 US gallons per flush. Units that meet or exceed this standard can carry the WaterSense sticker. The EPA estimates that the average US home will save US$90 per year, and $2,000 over the lifetime of the toilets. Dry toilets can lead to even more water savings in private homes as they use no water for flushing.

== History ==
In 1988, Massachusetts became the first state in the US to mandate the use of low-flush toilets in new construction and remodeling. In 1992 US President George H. W. Bush signed the Energy Policy Act. This law made 1.6 gallons per flush a mandatory federal maximum for new toilets. This law went into effect on January 1, 1994, for residential buildings and January 1, 1997, for commercial buildings.

== See also ==
- Low-flow fixtures
- Dual flush toilet
- Waterless urinal
- Residential water use in the U.S. and Canada
