= Water supply =

Provision of water by public utilities, commercial organisations or others

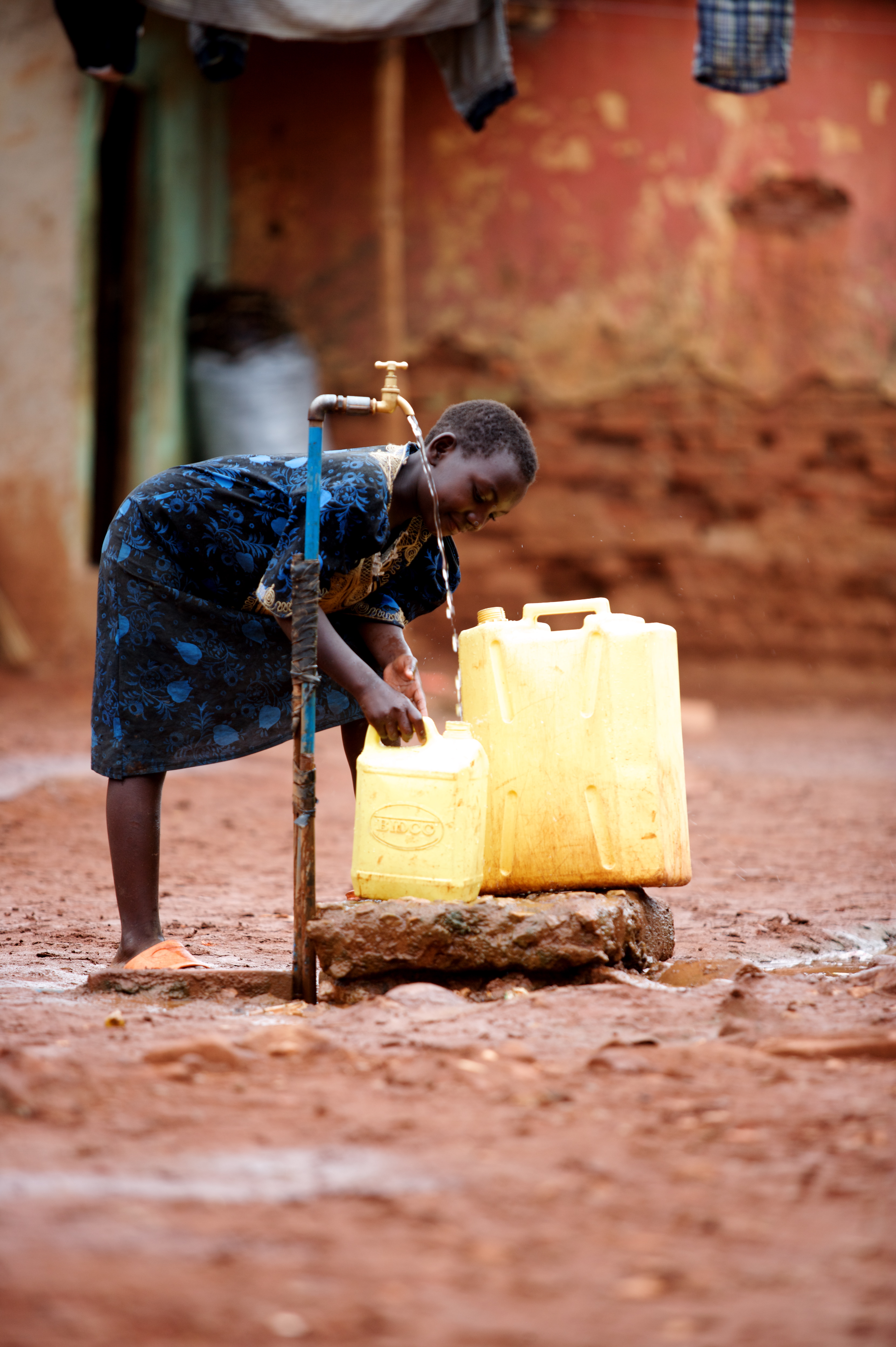
A girl collects clean water from a communal water supply in Kawempe, Uganda.

Water supply is the provision of water by public utilities, commercial organisations, community endeavors or by individuals, usually via a system of pumps and pipes. Public water supply systems are crucial to properly functioning societies. These systems are what supply drinking water to populations around the globe. Aspects of service quality include continuity of supply, water quality and water pressure. The institutional responsibility for water supply is arranged differently in different countries and regions (urban versus rural). It usually includes issues surrounding policy and regulation, service provision and standardization.

The cost of supplying water consists, to a very large extent, of fixed costs (capital costs and personnel costs) and only to a small extent of variable costs that depend on the amount of water consumed (mainly energy and chemicals). Almost all service providers in the world charge tariffs to recover part of their costs.

Water supply is a separate topic from irrigation, the practice and systems of water supply on a larger scale, for a wider variety of purposes, primarily agriculture.

== Technical overview ==
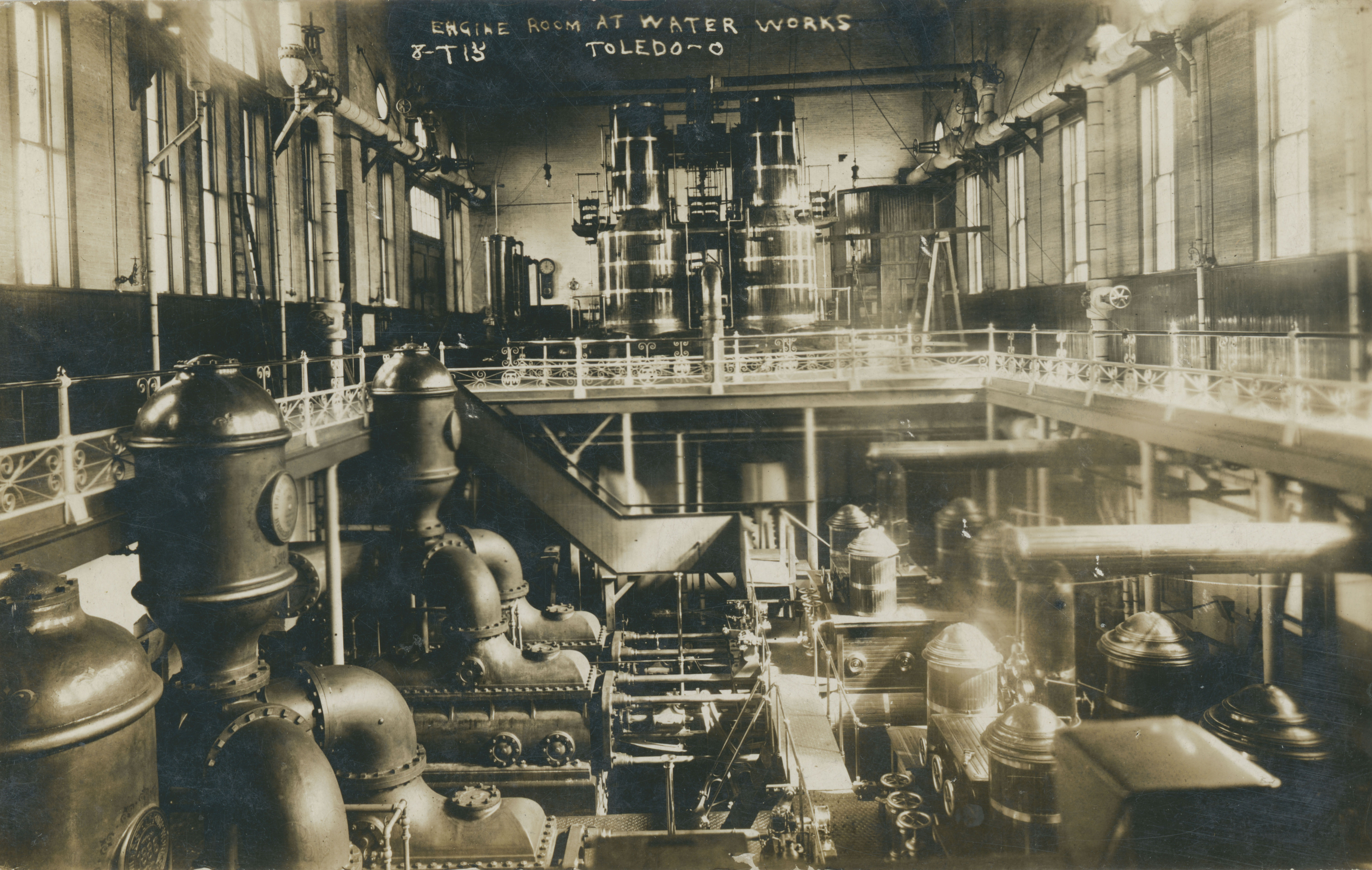
Engine room of municipal water works in Toledo, Ohio, 1908

Water supply systems get water from a variety of locations after appropriate treatment, including groundwater (aquifers), surface water (lakes and rivers), and the sea through desalination. The water treatment steps include, in most cases, purification, disinfection through chlorination and sometimes fluoridation. Treated water then either flows by gravity or is pumped to reservoirs, which can be elevated such as water towers or on the ground (for indicators related to the efficiency of drinking water distribution see non-revenue water). Once water is used, wastewater is typically discharged in a sewer system and treated in a sewage treatment plant before being discharged into a river, lake, or the sea or reused for landscaping or irrigation.

=== Supply network ===
A water supply network or water supply system is a system of engineered hydrologic and hydraulic components that provide water supply. A water supply system typically includes the following:

1. A drainage basin (see water purification – sources of drinking water)
2. A raw water collection point (above or below ground) where the water accumulates, such as a lake, a river, or groundwater from an underground aquifer. Raw water may be transferred using uncovered ground-level aqueducts, covered tunnels, or underground pipes to water purification facilities..
3. Water purification facilities. Treated water is transferred using water pipes (usually underground).
4. Water storage facilities such as reservoirs, water tanks, or water towers. Smaller water systems may store the water in cisterns or pressure vessels. Tall buildings may also need to store water locally in pressure vessels in order for the water to reach the upper floors.
5. Additional water pressurizing components such as pumping stations may need to be situated at the outlet of underground or aboveground reservoirs or cisterns (if gravity flow is impractical).
6. A pipe network for distribution of water to consumers (which may be private houses or industrial, commercial, or institution establishments) and other usage points (such as fire hydrants)
7. Connections to the sewers (underground pipes, or aboveground ditches in some developing countries) are generally found downstream of the water consumers, but the sewer system is considered to be a separate system, rather than part of the water supply system.

Water supply networks are often run by public utilities of the water industry.

=== Use ===
In the United States, the typical single family home uses about 520 L (138 US gal) of water per day (2016 estimate) or 222 L (58.6 US gal) per capita per day. This includes several common residential end use purposes (in decreasing order) like toilet use, showers, tap (faucet) use, washing machine use, leaks, other (unidentified), baths, and dishwasher use.

Recommended basic water requirements for human needs (per person)
Activity	Minimum, litres / day	Range / day
Drinking Water	5	2–5
Sanitation Services	20	20–75
Bathing	15	5–70
Cooking and Kitchen	10	10–50

During the beginning of the 21st Century, especially in areas of urban and suburban population centers, traditional centralized infrastructure have not been able to supply sufficient quantities of water to keep up with growing demand. Among several options that have been managed are the extensive use of desalination technology, this is especially prevalent in coastal areas and in "dry" countries like Australia. Decentralization of water infrastructure has grown extensively as a viable solution including rainwater harvesting and stormwater harvesting where policies are eventually tending towards a more rational use and sourcing of water incorporation concepts such as "Fit for Purpose".

== Service quality ==
Water supply service quality has many dimensions: continuity, water quality, pressure, and the degree of responsiveness of service providers to customer complaints. Many people in developing countries receive a poor or very poor quality of service.

=== Continuity of supply ===
Continuity of water supply is taken for granted in most developed countries but is a severe problem in many developing countries, where sometimes water is only provided for a few hours every day or a few days a week; that is, it is intermittent. This is especially problematic for informal settlements, which are often poorly connected to the water supply network and have no means of procuring alternative sources such as private boreholes. It is estimated that about half of the population of developing countries receives water on an intermittent basis.

=== Water quality ===
Drinking water quality has a micro-biological and a physico-chemical dimension. There are thousands of parameters of water quality. In public water supply systems water should, at a minimum, be disinfected—most commonly through the use of chlorination or the use of ultraviolet light—or it may need to undergo treatment, especially in the case of surface water. Water quality is also dependent of the quality and level of pollution of the water source.

=== Water pressure ===
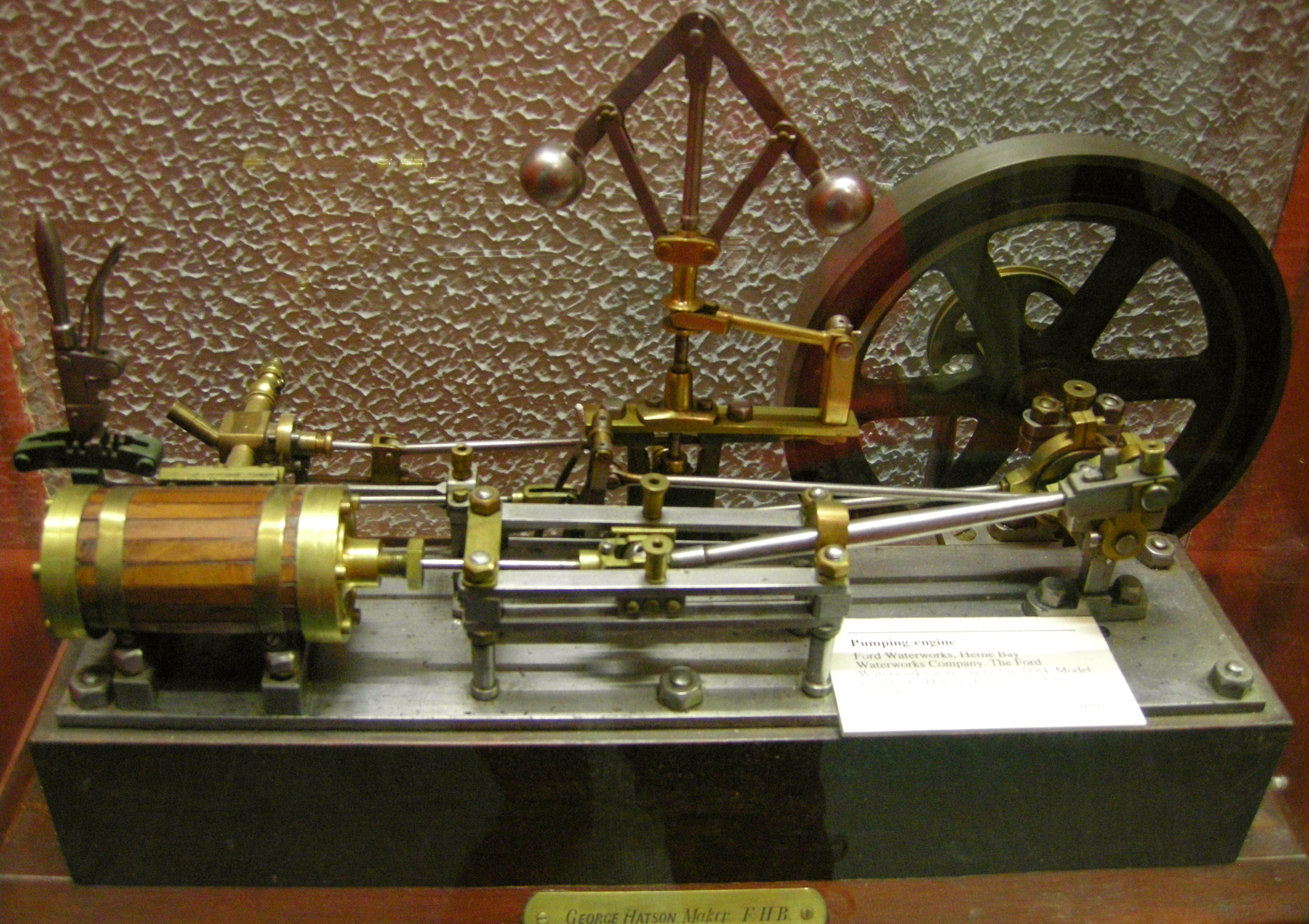
1880s model of pumping engine, in Herne Bay Museum

Water pressures vary in different locations of a distribution system. Water mains below the street may operate at higher pressures, with a pressure reducer located at each point where the water enters a building or a house. In poorly managed systems, water pressure can be so low as to result only in a trickle of water or so high that it leads to damage to plumbing fixtures and waste of water. Pressure in an urban water system is typically maintained either by a pressurised water tank serving an urban area, by pumping the water up into a water tower and relying on gravity to maintain a constant pressure in the system or solely by pumps at the water treatment plant and repeater pumping stations.

Typical UK pressures are 4 to 5 bars (60 to 70 psi) for an urban supply. However, some people can get over 8 bars (120 psi) or below 1 bar (15 psi). A single iron main pipe may cross a deep valley, it will have the same nominal pressure, however each consumer will get a bit more or less because of the hydrostatic pressure (about 1 bar per 10 m height). So people at the bottom of a 30-metre (100 ft) hill will get about 3 bar (44 psi) more than those at the top.

The effective pressure also varies because of the pressure loss due to supply resistance, even for the same static pressure. An urban consumer may have 5 metres (16 ft) of 15 mm (0.59 in) pipe running from the iron main, so the kitchen tap flow will be fairly unrestricted. A rural consumer may have a kilometre of rusted and limed 22 mm (0.87 in) iron pipe, so their kitchen tap flow will be small.

For this reason, the UK domestic water system has traditionally (prior to 1989) employed a "cistern feed" system, where the incoming supply is connected to the kitchen sink and also a header/storage tank in the attic. Water can dribble into this tank through a 12 mm (0.47 in) pipe, plus ball valve, and then supply the house on 22 or 28 mm (0.87 or 1.10 in) pipes. Gravity water has a small pressure (approximately 0.25 bars (3.6 psi) in the bathroom) so needs wide pipes to allow for higher flows. This is fine for baths and toilets but is frequently inadequate for showers. A booster pump or a hydrophore is installed to increase and maintain pressure. For this reason urban houses are increasingly using mains pressure boilers ("combies") which take a long time to fill a bath but suit the high back pressure of a shower.

== Institutional responsibility and governance ==
A great variety of institutions have responsibilities in water supply. A basic distinction is between institutions responsible for policy and regulation on the one hand; and institutions in charge of providing services on the other hand.

=== Policy and regulation ===
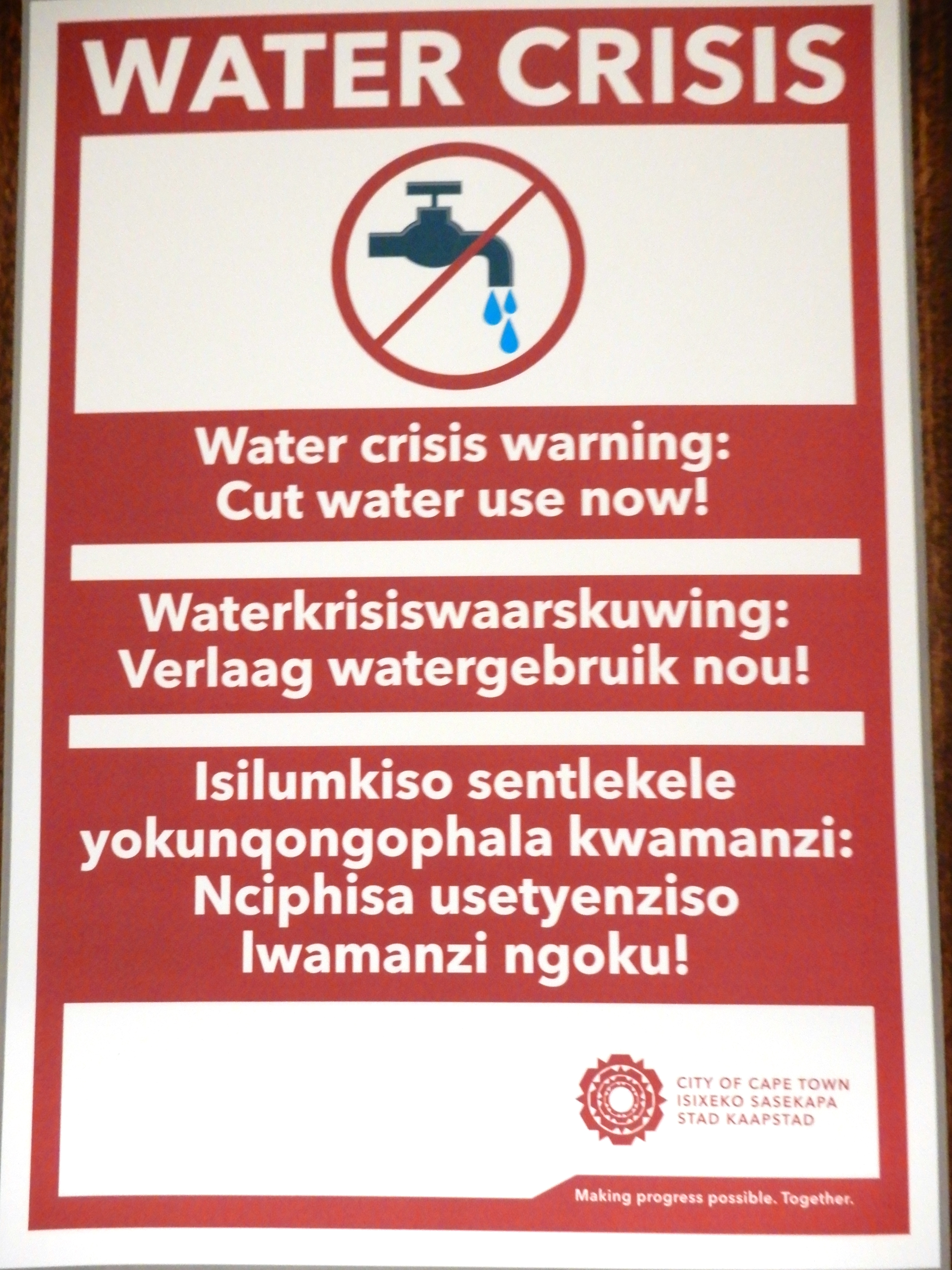
Cape Town water crisis warning, July 2018

Water supply policies and regulation are usually defined by one or several ministries, in consultation with the legislative branch. In the United States the United States Environmental Protection Agency, whose administrator reports directly to the President, is responsible for water and sanitation policy and standard setting within the executive branch. In other countries responsibility for sector policy is entrusted to a Ministry of Environment (such as in Mexico and Colombia), to a Ministry of Health (such as in Panama, Honduras and Uruguay), a Ministry of Public Works (such as in Ecuador and Haiti), a Ministry of Economy (such as in German states) or a Ministry of Energy (such as in Iran). A few countries, such as Jordan and Bolivia, even have a Ministry of Water. Often several ministries share responsibilities for water supply.

In the European Union, important policy functions have been entrusted to the supranational level. Policy and regulatory functions include the setting of tariff rules and the approval of tariff increases; setting, monitoring and enforcing norms for quality of service and environmental protection; benchmarking the performance of service providers; and reforms in the structure of institutions responsible for service provision. The distinction between policy functions and regulatory functions is not always clear-cut. In some countries they are both entrusted to ministries, but in others regulatory functions are entrusted to agencies that are separate from ministries.

==== Regulatory agencies ====
Dozens of countries around the world have established regulatory agencies for infrastructure services, including often water supply and sanitation, in order to better protect consumers and to improve efficiency. Regulatory agencies can be entrusted with a variety of responsibilities, including in particular the approval of tariff increases and the management of sector information systems, including benchmarking systems. Sometimes they also have a mandate to settle complaints by consumers that have not been dealt with satisfactorily by service providers. These specialized entities are expected to be more competent and objective in regulating service providers than departments of government Ministries. Regulatory agencies are supposed to be autonomous from the executive branch of government, but in many countries have often not been able to exercise a great degree of autonomy.

In the United States regulatory agencies for utilities have existed for almost a century at the level of states, and in Canada at the level of provinces. In both countries they cover several infrastructure sectors. In many US states they are called Public Utility Commissions. For England and Wales, a regulatory agency for water (OFWAT) was created as part of the privatization of the water industry in 1989. In many developing countries, water regulatory agencies were created during the 1990s in parallel with efforts at increasing private sector participation. (for more details on regulatory agencies in Latin America, for example, please see Water and sanitation in Latin America and the regional association of water regulatory agencies ADERASA.)

Many countries do not have regulatory agencies for water. In these countries service providers are regulated directly by local government, or the national government. This is, for example, the case in the countries of continental Europe, in China and India.

=== Service provision ===
Water supply service providers, which are often utilities, differ from each other in terms of their geographical coverage relative to administrative boundaries; their sectoral coverage; their ownership structure; and their governance arrangements.

==== Geographical coverage ====
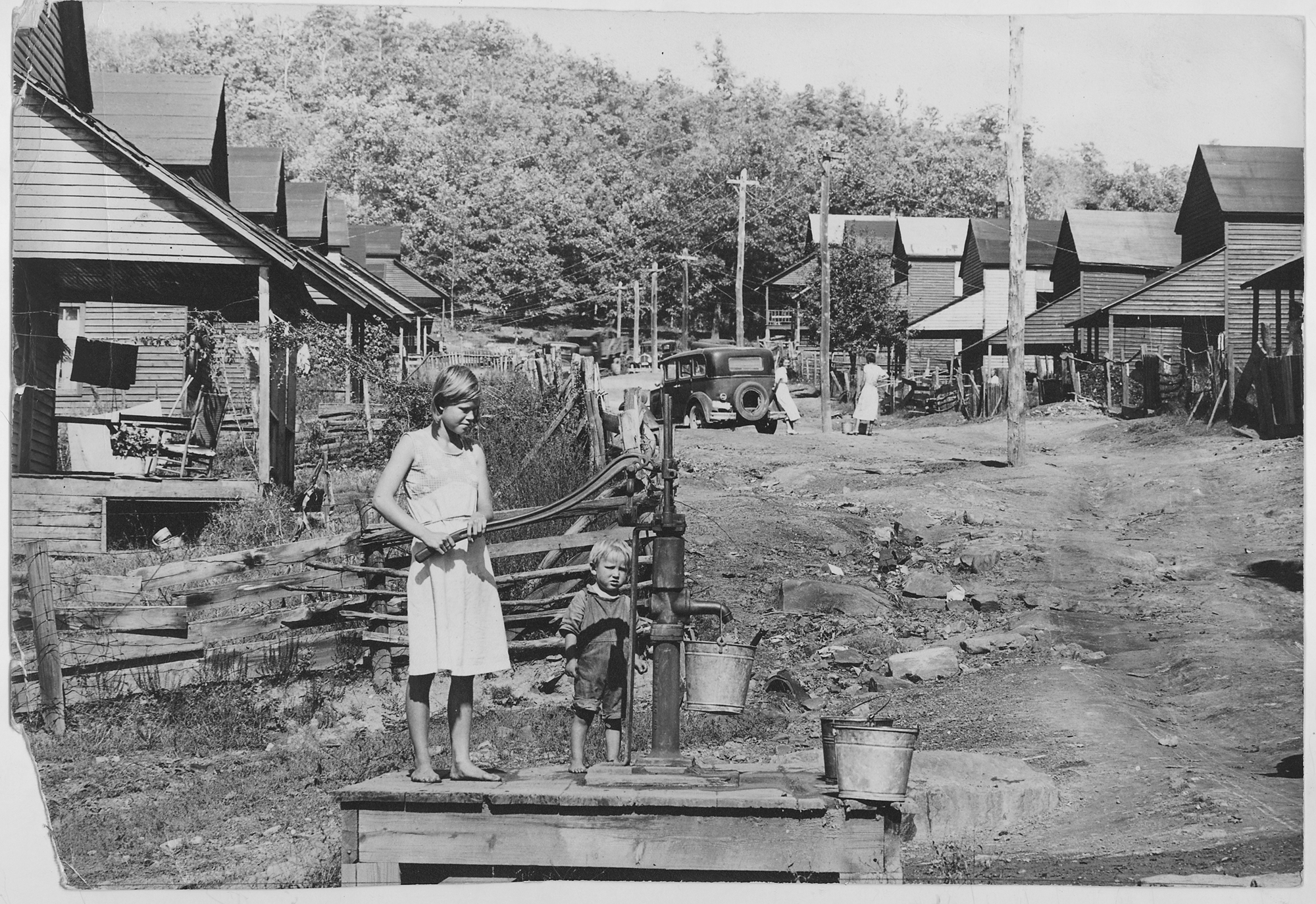
The sole water supply of this section of Wilder, Tennessee, 1942

Many water utilities provide services in a single city, town or municipality. However, in many countries municipalities have associated in regional or inter-municipal or multi-jurisdictional utilities to benefit from economies of scale. In the United States these can take the form of special-purpose districts which may have independent taxing authority. An example of a multi-jurisdictional water utility in the United States is WASA, a utility serving Washington, DC and various localities in the state of Maryland. Multi-jurisdictional utilities are also common in Germany, where they are known as "Zweckverbaende", in France and in Italy.

In some federal countries, there are water service providers covering most or all cities and towns in an entire state, such as in all states of Brazil and some states in Mexico (see Water supply and sanitation in Mexico). In England and Wales, water supply and sewerage is supplied almost entirely through ten regional companies. Some smaller countries, especially developed countries, have established service providers that cover the entire country or at least most of its cities and major towns. Such national service providers are especially prevalent in West Africa and Central America, but also exist, for example, in Tunisia, Jordan and Uruguay (see also water supply and sanitation in Uruguay). In rural areas, where about half the world population lives, water services are often not provided by utilities, but by community-based organizations which usually cover one or sometimes several villages.

==== Sector coverage ====
Some water utilities provide only water supply services, while sewerage is under the responsibility of a different entity. This is for example the case in Tunisia. However, in most cases water utilities also provide sewer and sewage treatment services. In some cities or countries utilities also distribute electricity. In a few cases such multi-utilities also collect solid waste and provide local telephone services. An example of such an integrated utility can be found in the Colombian city of Medellín. Utilities that provide water, sanitation and electricity can be found in Frankfurt, Germany (Mainova), in Casablanca, Morocco and in Gabon in West Africa. Multi-utilities provide certain benefits such as common billing and the option to cross-subsidize water services with revenues from electricity sales, if permitted by law.

==== Ownership and governance arrangements ====
Water supply providers can be either public, private, mixed or cooperative. Most urban water supply services around the world are provided by public entities. As Willem-Alexander, Prince of Orange (2002) stated, "The water crisis that is affecting so many people is mainly a crisis of governance—not of water scarcity." The introduction of cost-reflective tariffs together with cross-subsidization between richer and poorer consumers is an essential governance reform in order to reduce the high levels of unaccounted-for water (UAW) and to provide the finance needed to extend the network to those poorest households who remain unconnected. Partnership arrangements between the public and private sector can play an important role in order to achieve this objective.

===== Private sector participation =====
An estimated 10 percent of urban water supply is provided by private or mixed public-private companies, usually under concessions, leases or management contracts. Under these water service contract arrangements the public entity that is legally responsible for service provision delegates certain or all aspects of service provision to the private service provider for a period typically ranging from 4 to 30 years. The public entity continues to own the assets. These arrangements are common in France and in Spain. Only in few parts of the world water supply systems have been completely sold to the private sector (privatization), such as in England and Wales as well as in Chile. The largest private water companies in the world are Suez and Veolia Environnement from France; Aguas de Barcelona from Spain; and Thames Water from the UK, all of which are engaged internationally (see links to website of these companies below). In recent years, a number of cities have reverted to the public sector in a process called "remunicipalization".

===== Public water service provision =====
90 percent of urban water supply and sanitation services are currently in the public sector. They are owned by the state or local authorities, or also by collectives or cooperatives. They run without an aim for profit but are based on the ethos of providing a common good considered to be of public interest. In most middle and low-income countries, these publicly owned and managed water providers can be inefficient as a result of political interference, leading to over-staffing and low labor productivity.

Ironically, the main losers from this institutional arrangement are the urban poor in these countries. Because they are not connected to the water supply network, they end up paying far more per liter of water than do more well-off households connected to the network who benefit from the implicit subsidies that they receive from loss-making utilities.

The fact that we are still so far from achieving universal access to clean water and sanitation shows that public water authorities, in their current state, are not working well enough. Yet some are being very successful and are modelling the best forms of public management. As Ryutaro Hashimoto, former Japanese Prime Minister, notes: "Public water services currently provide more than 90 percent of water supply in the world. Modest improvement in public water operators will have immense impact on global provision of services."

===== Governance arrangements =====
Governance arrangements for both public and private utilities can take many forms. Governance arrangements define the relationship between the service provider, its owners, its customers and regulatory entities. They determine the financial autonomy of the service provider and thus its ability to maintain its assets, expand services, attract and retain qualified staff, and ultimately to provide high-quality services. Key aspects of governance arrangements are the extent to which the entity in charge of providing services is insulated from arbitrary political intervention; and whether there is an explicit mandate and political will to allow the service provider to recover all or at least most of its costs through tariffs and retain these revenues. If water supply is the responsibility of a department that is integrated in the administration of a city, town or municipality, there is a risk that tariff revenues are diverted for other purposes. In some cases, there is also a risk that staff are appointed mainly on political grounds rather than based on their professional credentials.

=== Standardization ===
International standards for water supply system are covered by International Classification of Standards (ICS) 91.140.60.

=== Comparing the performance of water and sanitation service providers ===
Comparing the performance of water and sanitation service providers (utilities) is needed, because the sector offers limited scope for direct competition (natural monopoly). Firms operating in competitive markets are under constant pressure to out perform each other. Water utilities are often sheltered from this pressure, and it frequently shows: some utilities are on a sustained improvement track, but many others keep falling further behind best practice. Benchmarking the performance of utilities allows the stimulation of competition, establish realistic targets for improvement and create pressure to catch up with better utilities. Information on benchmarks for water and sanitation utilities is provided by the International Benchmarking Network for Water and Sanitation Utilities.

== Financial aspects ==
=== Costs and financing ===
The cost of supplying water consists, to a very large extent, of fixed costs (capital costs and personnel costs) and only to a small extent of variable costs that depend on the amount of water consumed (mainly energy and chemicals). The full cost of supplying water in urban areas in developed countries is about US$1–2 per cubic meter depending on local costs and local water consumption levels. The cost of sanitation (sewerage and wastewater treatment) is another US$1–2 per cubic meter. These costs are somewhat lower in developing countries. Throughout the world, only part of these costs is usually billed to consumers, the remainder being financed through direct or indirect subsidies from local, regional or national governments (see section on tariffs).

Besides subsidies water supply investments are financed through internally generated revenues as well as through debt. Debt financing can take the form of credits from commercial Banks, credits from international financial institutions such as the World Bank and regional development banks (in the case of developing countries), and bonds (in the case of some developed countries and some upper middle-income countries).

=== Tariffs ===
Almost all service providers in the world charge tariffs to recover part of their costs. According to estimates by the World Bank the average (mean) global water tariff is US$0.53 per cubic meter. In developed countries the average tariff is US$1.04, while it is only U$0.11 in the poorest developing countries. The lowest tariffs in developing countries are found in South Asia (mean of US$0.09 per cubic meter), while the highest are found in Latin America (US$0.41 per cubic meter). Data for 132 cities were assessed. The tariff is estimate for a consumption level of 15 cubic meters per month. Few utilities do recover all their costs. According to the same World Bank study only 30 percent of utilities globally, and only 50 percent of utilities in developed countries, generate sufficient revenue to cover operation, maintenance and partial capital costs.

According to another study undertaken in 2006 by NUS Consulting, the average water and sewerage tariff in 14 mainly OECD countries excluding VAT varied between US$0.66 per cubic meter in the United States and the equivalent of US$2.25 per cubic meter in Denmark. However, water consumption is much higher in the US than in Europe. Therefore, residential water bills may be very similar, even if the tariff per unit of consumption tends to be higher in Europe than in the US.

A typical family on the US east coast paid between US$30 and US$70 per month for water and sewer services in 2005.

In developing countries, tariffs are usually much further from covering costs. Residential water bills for a typical consumption of 15 cubic meters per month vary between less than US$1 and US$12 per month.

Water and sanitation tariffs, which are almost always billed together, can take many different forms. Where meters are installed, tariffs are typically volumetric (per usage), sometimes combined with a small monthly fixed charge. In the absence of meters, flat or fixed rates—which are independent of actual consumption—are being charged. In developed countries, tariffs are usually the same for different categories of users and for different levels of consumption.

In developing countries, the situation is often characterized by cross-subsidies with the intent to make water more affordable for residential low-volume users that are assumed to be poor. For example, industrial and commercial users are often charged higher tariffs than public or residential users. Also, metered users are often charged higher tariffs for higher levels of consumption (increasing-block tariffs). However, cross-subsidies between residential users do not always reach their objective. Given the overall low level of water tariffs in developing countries even at higher levels of consumption, most consumption subsidies benefit the wealthier segments of society. Also, high industrial and commercial tariffs can provide an incentive for these users to supply water from other sources than the utility (own wells, water tankers) and thus actually erode the utility's revenue base.

=== Investments needed in developing countries ===
Water supply and sanitation require a huge amount of capital investment in infrastructure such as pipe networks, pumping stations and water treatment works. It is estimated that in developing countries investments of at least US$200 billion have to be made per year to replace aging water infrastructure to guarantee supply, reduce leakage rates and protect water quality.

International attention has focused upon the needs of developing countries. To meet the Millennium Development Goals targets of halving the proportion of the population lacking access to safe drinking water and basic sanitation by 2015, current annual investment on the order of US$10 to US$15 billion would need to be roughly doubled. This does not include investments required for the maintenance of existing infrastructure.

Once infrastructure is in place, operating water supply and sanitation systems entails significant ongoing costs to cover personnel, energy, chemicals, maintenance and other expenses. The sources of money to meet these capital and operational costs are essentially either user fees, public funds or some combination of the two. It is also important to consider is the flexibility of the water supply system.

== Metering ==
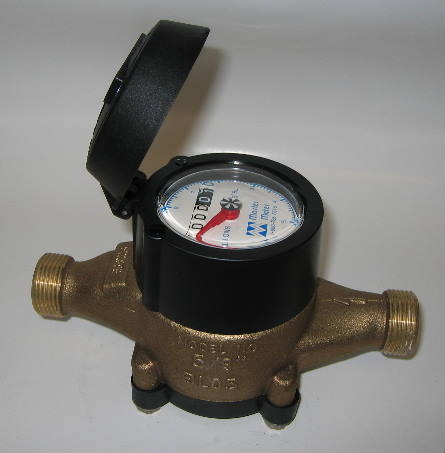
A typical residential water meter

Metering of water supply is usually motivated by one or several of four objectives. First, it provides an incentive to conserve water which protects water resources (environmental objective). Second, it can postpone costly system expansion and saves energy and chemical costs (economic objective). Third, it allows a utility to better locate distribution losses (technical objective). Fourth, it allows suppliers to charge for water based on use, which is perceived by many as the fairest way to allocate the costs of water supply to users. Metering is considered good practice in water supply and is widespread in developed countries, except for the United Kingdom. In developing countries it is estimated that half of all urban water supply systems are metered and the tendency is increasing.

Water meters are read by one of several methods:

- the water customer writes down the meter reading and mails in a postcard with this info to the water department;
- the water customer writes down the meter reading and uses a phone dial-in system to transfer this info to the water department;
- the water customer logs into the website of the water supply company, enters the address, meter ID and meter readings
- a meter reader comes to the premises and enters the meter reading into a handheld computer;
- the meter reading is echoed on a display unit mounted to the outside of the premises, where a meter reader records them;
- a small radio is hooked up to the meter to automatically transmit readings to corresponding receivers in handheld computers, utility vehicles or distributed collectors
- a small computer is hooked up to the meter that can either dial out or receive automated phone calls that give the reading to a central computer system.

Most cities are increasingly installing automatic meter reading (AMR) systems to prevent fraud, to lower ever-increasing labor and liability costs and to improve customer service and satisfaction.

== Global access ==
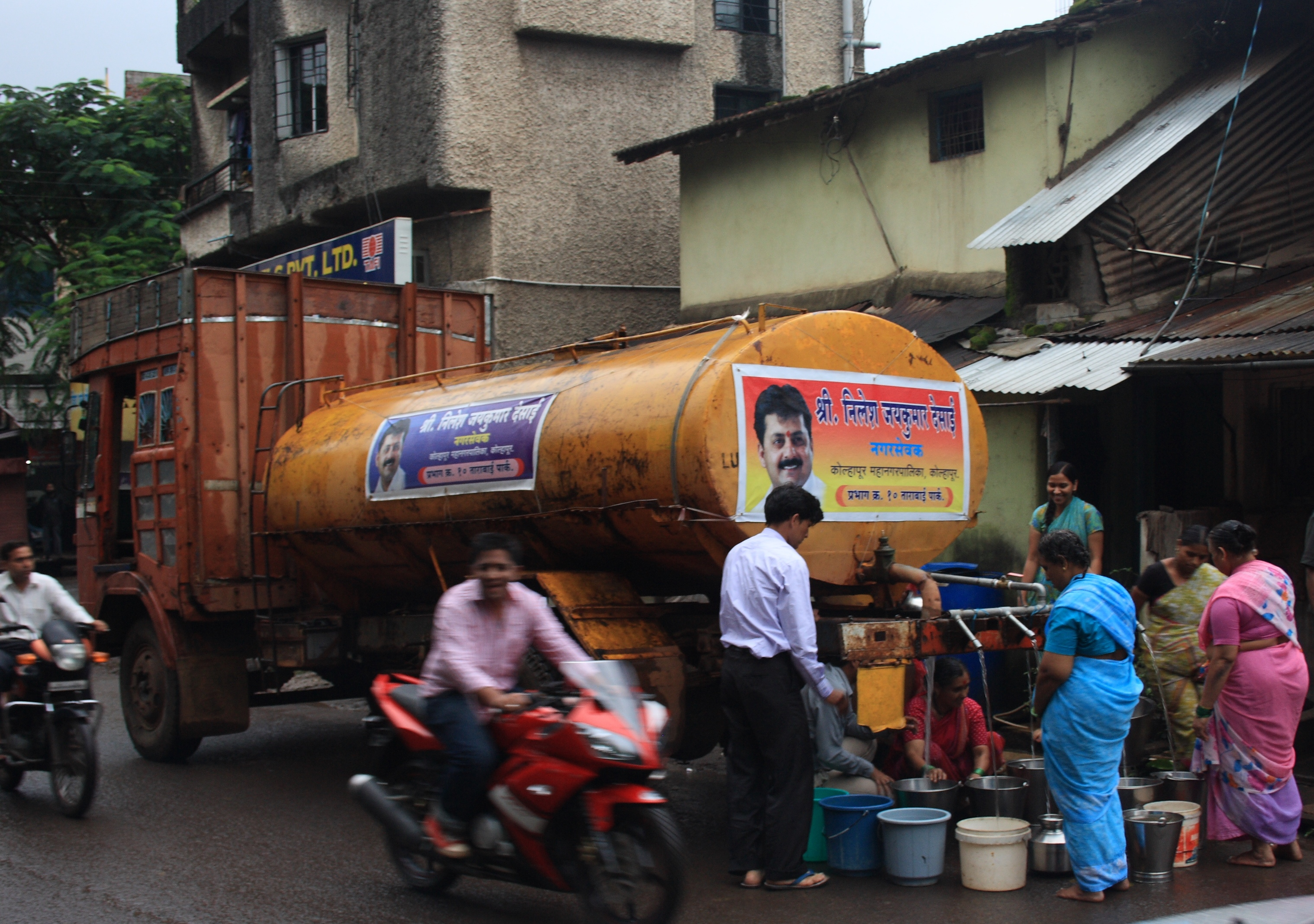
Water supplied by a truck in Kolhapur, Maharashtra, India

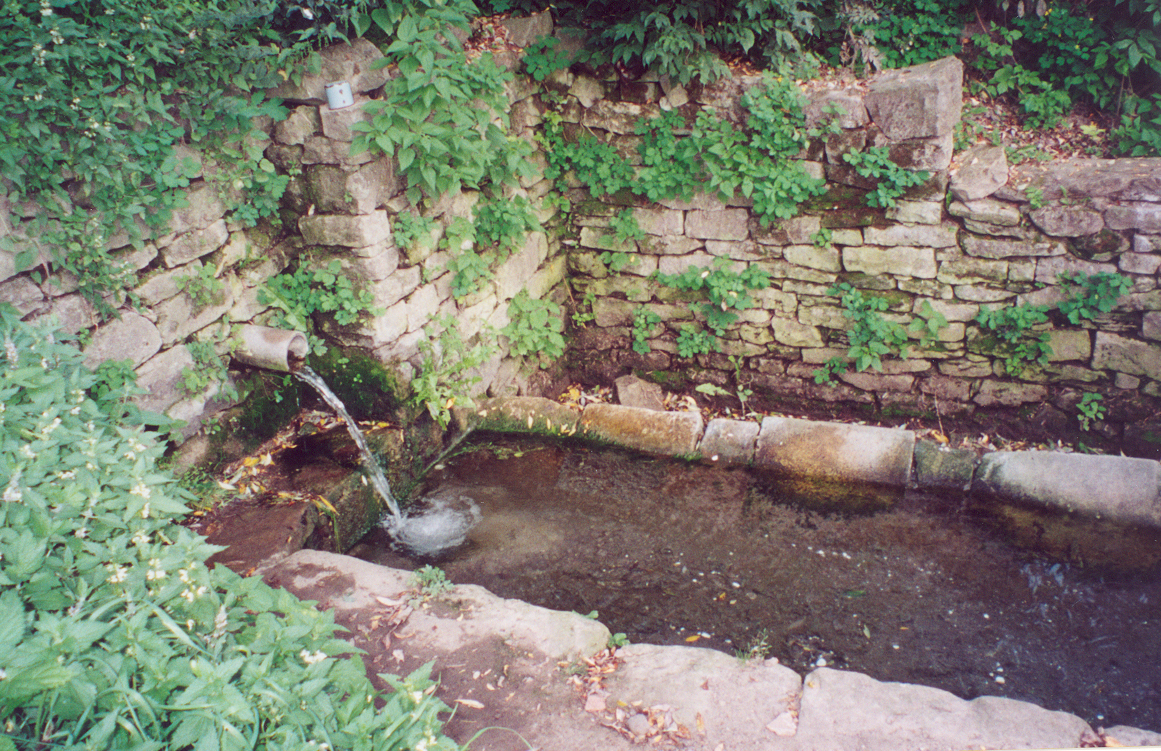
Shipot, a common source of drinking water in Dzyhivka, Ukraine

According to the World Health Organization (WHO), "access to safe drinking-water is essential to health, a basic human right and a component of effective policy for health protection." In 1990, only 76 percent of the global population had access to drinking water. By 2015 that number had increased to 91 percent. In 1990, most countries in Latin America, East and South Asia, and Sub-Saharan Africa were well below 90%. In Sub-Saharan Africa, where the rates are lowest, household access ranges from 40 to 80 percent. Countries that experience violent conflict can have reductions in drinking water access: One study found that a conflict with about 2,500 battle deaths deprives 1.8% of the population of potable water. Typically in developed countries, tap water meets drinking water quality standards, even though only a small proportion is actually consumed or used in food preparation. Other typical uses for tap water include washing, toilets, and irrigation. Greywater may also be used for toilets or irrigation. Its use for irrigation however may be associated with risks.

Globally, by 2015, 89% of people had access to water from a source that is suitable for drinking – called improved water sources. In sub-Saharan Africa, access to potable water ranged from 40% to 80% of the population. Nearly 4.2 billion people worldwide had access to tap water, while another 2.4 billion had access to wells or public taps.

== History ==
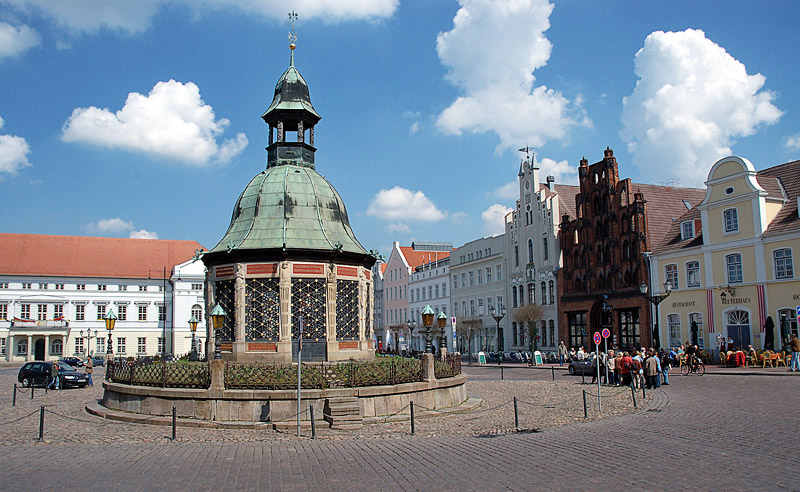
Wasserkunst and fountain from 1602 in Wismar, Germany. It's an example of pre-industrialization waterworks and fountain.

Throughout history, people have devised systems to make getting and using water more convenient. Living in semi-arid regions, ancient Persians in the 1st millennium BC used qanat system to gain access to water in the mountains. Early Rome had indoor plumbing, meaning a system of aqueducts and pipes that terminated in homes and at public wells and fountains for people to use.

Until the Enlightenment era, little progress was made in water supply and sanitation and the engineering skills of the Romans were largely neglected throughout Europe. It was in the 18th century that a rapidly growing population fueled a boom in the establishment of private water supply networks in London. London water supply infrastructure developed over many centuries from early mediaeval conduits, through major 19th-century treatment works built in response to cholera threats, to modern, large-scale reservoirs. The first screw-down water tap was patented in 1845 by Guest and Chrimes, a brass foundry in Rotherham.

The first documented use of sand filters to purify the water supply dates to 1804, when the owner of a bleachery in Paisley, Scotland, John Gibb, installed an experimental filter, selling his unwanted surplus to the public. The first treated public water supply in the world was installed by engineer James Simpson for the Chelsea Waterworks Company in London in 1829. The practice of water treatment soon became mainstream, and the virtues of the system were made starkly apparent after the investigations of the physician John Snow during the 1854 Broad Street cholera outbreak demonstrated the role of the water supply in spreading the cholera epidemic.

== See also ==
- Human right to water and sanitation
- Nonresidential water use in the US
- Residential water use in the US and Canada
- Water efficiency
- Water resources
- Water scarcity
- Water security
- Water supply terrorism
