= Dual flush toilet =

Flush toilet that uses two buttons to flush different amounts of water

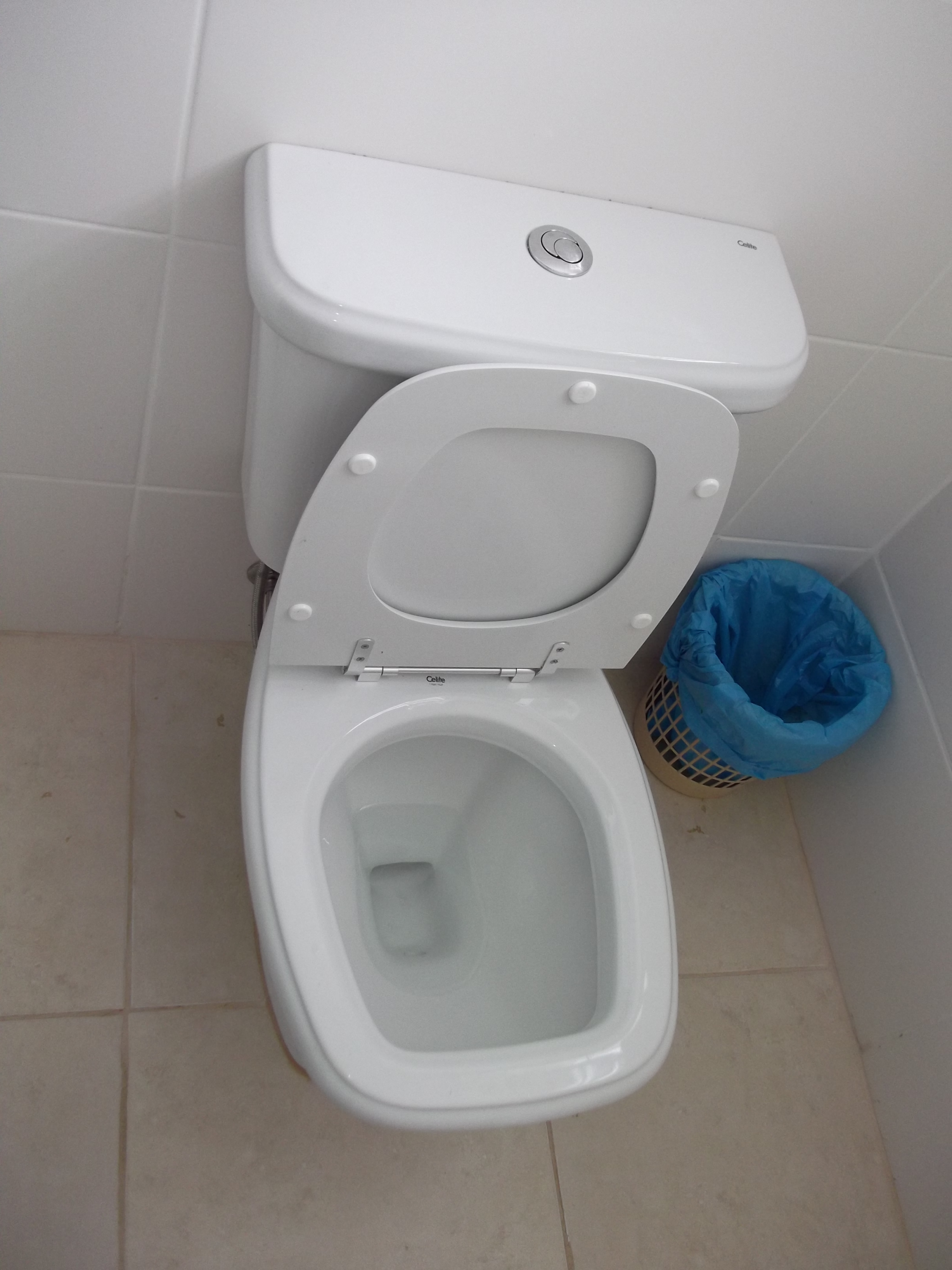
A dual flush toilet; note the two buttons at the top of the cistern.

A dual flush toilet is a variation of the flush toilet that uses two buttons or a handle mechanism to flush two different quantities of water.

The purpose of this mechanism is to reduce the quantity of water used to flush different types of waste. The design takes advantage of the fact that liquid waste requires less water to flush than solid waste; the smaller button is used to dispose of liquid and the larger button for solids.

== Development ==
The system was developed by Japanese sanitary product manufacturer TOTO in 1960. It was equipped with two levers and built-in hand-washer, and also notable in that it reused the water in the hand-washer for flushing. However, it was not commercially successful, either in Japan or internationally. In 1976, American industrial designer Victor Papanek proposed the dual flush system in his book Design for the real world. However, the first practical implementation was designed in 1980, by staff at the Australian sanitary-ware company Caroma, with flush volumes of 11 and 5.5 litres. The design caught on, and a redesign in 1994 cut water usage to 6 and 3 litres.

The dual-flush toilet has become almost universally adopted in Australia, New Zealand, Singapore, Sweden, Israel and many other countries, with its use in new buildings often mandated by legislation in those countries. The more complex dual-flush mechanism is more expensive than many other types of low-flush toilets.

== Mechanism ==
Push-button

Due to being a development of the traditional Australian flush toilet, the dual-flush toilet differs from siphon-flush toilets in that it relies on gravity to remove waste from the toilet. The lack of siphoning also means that the toilet requires less water to operate. Due to this, the waterline is considerably lower than that in siphon-flush toilets.

The toilet has two buttons on the cistern rather than the single-flush one; one button delivers a lesser amount of water (e.g. 3 litres) and the other a greater amount (e.g. 6 litres). It also uses a larger 10 cm trapway in the bowl, allowing for water to come out faster and clear the bowl efficiently.

Lever

There are also dual-flush toilets that use a siphon valve operated by a lever rather than buttons, with a ≤ 6L full flush, and a ≤ 3L half-flush if the flush handle is held down or released immediately after flushing.

Tipping bucket

The tipping bucket cistern can operate in a dual flush mode when the lever is rotated halfway 2.5/5 litre.

== Advantages ==
The dual-flush toilet typically uses less water, resulting in lower running costs and less environmental impact. It was promoted by the Australian Government under its "Target 155" campaign. The first dual-flush toilets had a 4.5 litre (half) and 9 litre (full) flush, but innovations by Caroma brought that down to 3 litres and 4.5 litres respectively, achieving a WELS rating of 4 and 5 stars in Australia.

Australian governments have used rebates to encourage the replacement of old single-flush toilets with more water-efficient ones. For dual-flush toilets, with a star rating of 4 or higher, owners may be able to qualify to claim a rebate from the State Government in Victoria, New South Wales, the ACT or South Australia.

In Britain, the cost of a dual-flush mechanism which can be retro-fitted to an existing toilet was estimated to be from about £15 in 2007.

== Disadvantages ==
While dual flush reduces running cost, the initial purchase price is higher, and replacing a toilet entails installation cost. In many cases, it is possible to replace the flushing mechanism of an existing installation; such retrofitting can cost about US$30.

In the United States, the Energy Policy Act was signed into law in 1992 and took effect in 1994, requiring that toilets sold use no more than 6 litres (1.6 US gal) per flush. Fixtures that use a maximum of 20% less than the federally mandated maximum of 6 litres (1.6 US gal) receive the WaterSense label, a US Environmental Protection Agency (EPA) program designed to encourage water efficiency in the United States.

For dual-flush toilets to receive this label, the average flushing volume of two reduced flushes and one full flush must be below 4.8 litres (1.28 US gal).

While all dual-flush toilets are commonly seen as water-saving, this does not apply to all designs. In the US, some dual-flush toilets have flushes of 1.6 and 1.28 US gallons (6.1 and 4.8 L), which do not fulfill criteria for the WaterSense label and thus cannot be classified as high-efficiency toilets. Based on the WaterSense averaging rule over two reduced flushes and one full flush, a dual-flush toilet with a full flush at the US legal maximum of 1.6 US gallons (6.1 L) must have a reduced flush of 1.12 US gallons (4.2 L) or less to meet the WaterSense standard of 1.28 US gallons (4.8 L) on average. A common combination for dual-flush toilets meeting the WaterSense standard is a reduced flush of 1.1 US gallons (4.2 L) and a full flush of 1.6 US gallons (6.1 L).

Dual flush mechanisms are also more likely to develop leaks than a traditional siphon; the UK supplier Thames Water claimed in 2020 that dual flush toilets were likely to be wasting more water than they save due to a combination of leaks and confusion over which button to press.
