= Water conservation =

Policies for sustainable development of water use

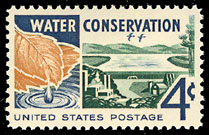
United States 1960 postal stamp advocating water conservation

Water conservation aims to sustainably manage the natural resource of fresh water, protect the hydrosphere, and meet current and future human demand. Water conservation makes it possible to avoid water scarcity. It covers all the policies, strategies and activities to reach these aims. Population, household size and growth and affluence all affect how much water is used.

Although the terms "water efficiency" and "water conservation" are used interchangeably they are not the same. Water efficiency is the improvements such as the new technology that help with the efficiency and reduction of using water. On the other hand, water conservation is the action of conserving water. In short, water efficiency relates to the development and innovations which help use water more efficiently and water conservation is the act of saving or preserving water.

Climate change and other factors have increased pressure on natural water resources. This is especially the case in manufacturing and agricultural irrigation. Many countries have successfully implemented policies to conserve water conservation. There are several key activities to conserve water. One is beneficial reduction in water loss, use and waste of resources. Another is avoiding any damage to water quality. A third is improving water management practices that reduce the use or enhance the beneficial use of water.

Technology solutions exist for households, commercial and agricultural applications to reduce the use/loss of water. Water conservation programs involved in social solutions are typically initiated at the local level, by either municipal water utilities or regional governments.

== Aims in water efficiency ==
Water conservation is the act of conserving water. Although water conservation was something people were working on it became mainstream for a number of reasons. Those reasons include supply shortages, escalating costs of infrastructure, state and federal legislative mandates, public desire to be "green", and conserving water no longer equals revenue. Supply shortages of what is meant to be a renewable resource is what most people target when using water conservation techniques.

== Strategies ==
The strategies to improve water conservation have similar characteristics which include having any beneficial reduction in water loss use and waste of resources, avoid any damage to water quality, and improve water management practices that reduce the use or enhance the beneficial use of water.

One of the strategies in water conservation is rainwater harvesting. Digging ponds, lakes, canals, expanding the water reservoir, and installing rain water catching ducts and filtration systems on homes are different methods of harvesting rain water. Many people in many countries keep clean containers so they can boil it and drink it, which is useful to supply water to the needy. Harvested and filtered rain water can be used for toilets, home gardening, lawn irrigation, and small scale agriculture.

Another strategy in water conservation is protecting groundwater resources. When precipitation occurs, some infiltrates the soil and goes underground. Water in this saturation zone is called groundwater. Contamination of groundwater causes the groundwater water supply to not be able to be used as a resource of fresh drinking water and the natural regeneration of contaminated groundwater can take years to replenish. Some examples of potential sources of groundwater contamination include storage tanks, septic systems, uncontrolled hazardous waste, landfills, atmospheric contaminants, chemicals, and road salts. Contamination of groundwater decreases the replenishment of available freshwater so taking preventative measures by protecting groundwater resources from contamination is an important aspect of water conservation.

An additional strategy to water conservation is practicing sustainable methods of utilizing groundwater resources. Groundwater flows due to gravity and eventually discharges into streams. Excess pumping of groundwater leads to a decrease in groundwater levels and if continued it can exhaust the resource. Ground and surface waters are connected and overuse of groundwater can reduce and, in extreme examples, diminish the water supply of lakes, rivers, and streams. In coastal regions, over pumping groundwater can increase saltwater intrusion which results in the contamination of groundwater water supply. Sustainable use of groundwater is essential in water conservation.

A fundamental component to water conservation strategy is communication and education outreach of different water programs. Developing communication that educates science to land managers, policy makers, farmers, and the general public is another important strategy utilized in water conservation. Communication of the science of how water systems work is an important aspect when creating a management plan to conserve that system and is often used for ensuring the right management plan to be put into action.

The conservation of water is extremely important in order to preserve wildlife habitats. There are many organisms in temperate regions who are affected by shortages in water. Additionally, many freshwater organisms are increasingly feeling the impacts of water pollution as it disrupts the ecosystem.

"World Water Day" is celebrated on 22 March.

== Social solutions ==
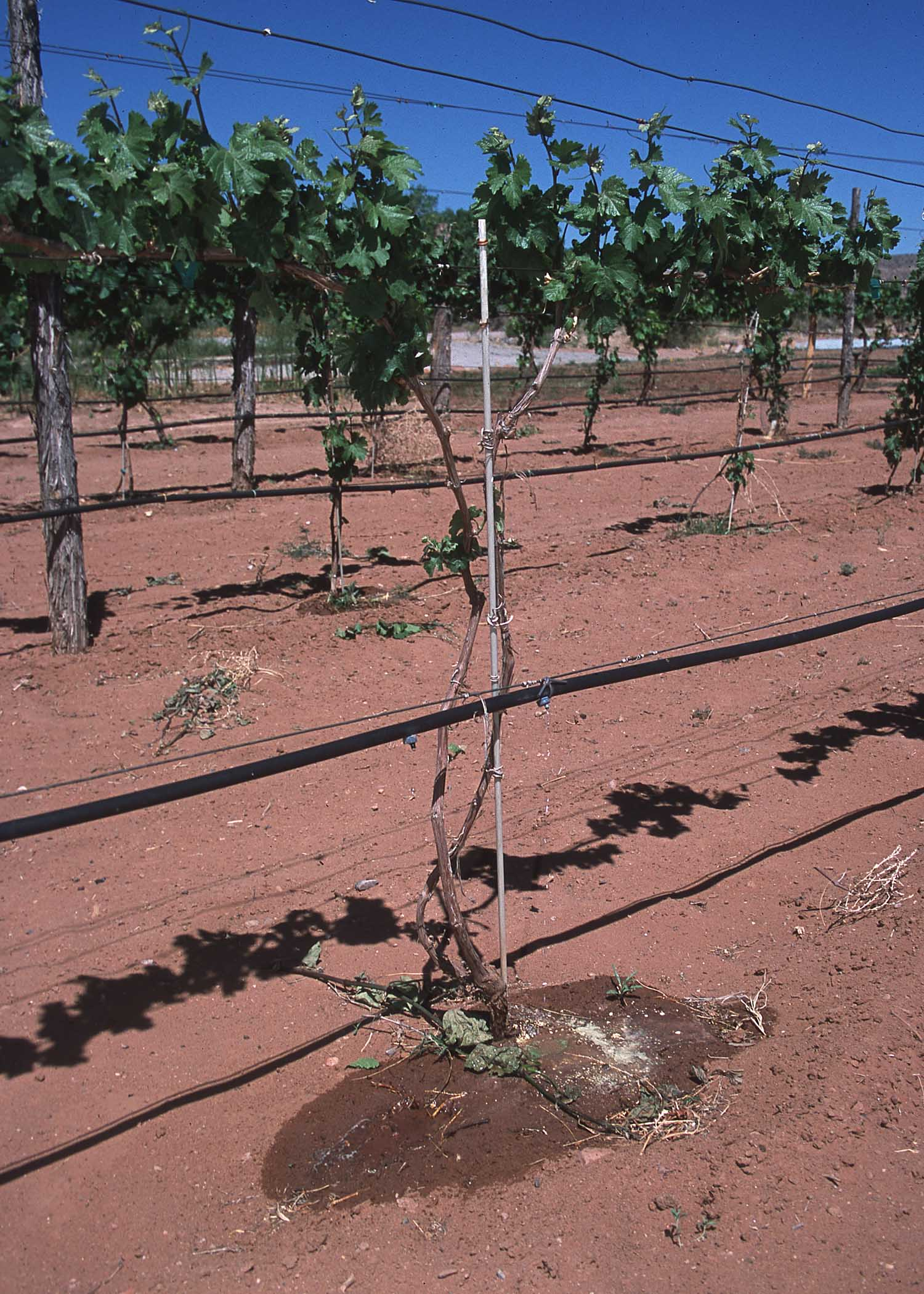
Drip irrigation system in New Mexico

Water conservation programs involved in social solutions are typically initiated at the local level, by either municipal water utilities or regional governments. Common strategies include public outreach campaigns, tiered water rates (charging progressively higher prices as water use increases), or restrictions on outdoor water use such as lawn watering and car washing. Cities in dry climates often require or encourage the installation of xeriscaping or natural landscaping in new homes to reduce outdoor water usage. Most urban outdoor water use in California is residential, illustrating a reason for outreach to households as well as businesses.

One fundamental conservation goal is universal water metering. The prevalence of residential water metering varies significantly worldwide. Recent studies have estimated that water supplies are metered in less than 30% of UK households. Although individual water meters have often been considered impractical in homes with private wells or in multifamily buildings, the US Environmental Protection Agency estimates that metering alone can reduce consumption by 20 to 40 percent. In addition to raising consumer awareness of their water use, metering is also an important way to identify and localize water leakage. Water metering might benefit society by providing a financial incentive to avoid waste in water use.

Some researchers have suggested that water conservation efforts should be primarily directed at farmers, in light of the fact that crop irrigation accounts for 70% of the world's fresh water use. The agricultural sector of most countries is important both economically and politically, and water subsidies are common. Conservation advocates have urged removal of all subsidies to force farmers to grow more water-efficient crops and adopt less wasteful irrigation techniques.

New technology poses a few new options for consumers, features such as full flush and half flush when using a toilet are trying to make a difference in water consumption and waste. It is also possible to use/"pollute" the water in stages (keeping use in flush toilets for last), hereby allowing more use of the water for various tasks within a same cycle (before it needs to be purified again, which can also be done in-situ). Earthships often use such a setup.

Also available are modern shower heads that help reduce wasting water: Old shower heads are said to use 5-10 gallons per minute, while new fixtures available use 2.5 gallons per minute and offer equal water coverage. Another method is to recycle the water of the shower directly, by means a semi-closed system which features a pump and filter. Such a setup (called a "water recycling shower") has also been employed at the VIRTUe LINQ house. Besides recycling water, it also reuses the heat of the water (which would otherwise be lost).

Contrary to the popular view that the most effective way to save water is to curtail water-using behavior (e.g., by taking shorter showers), experts suggest the most efficient way is replacing toilets and retrofitting washers; as demonstrated by two household end use logging studies in the US.

Some water-saving technology utilized in homes include energy-efficient water heads, composting toilets, dual flush toilets, faucet aerators, rainwater harvesting, weather-based irrigation controllers, garden hose nozzles, and automatic faucets.

Smart water meters are also a promising technology for reducing household water usage. A study conducted in Valencia, Spain, shows the potential that smart meter-based water consumption feedback has for conserving water in households. The findings showed that households that were equipped with smart water meters increased their water savings. This technology works to show people how much water they were using in their household, suggest ways they can reduce water usage, and incentivize water savings with physical rewards.

=== Applications ===
Many water-saving devices (such as low-flush toilets) that are useful in homes can also be useful for business water saving. Other water-saving technology for businesses includes waterless urinals, waterless car washes, foot-operated taps, pressurized water brooms, cooling towers, water-saving steam sterilizers, rainwater harvesting, fog harvesting, and water-to-water heat exchangers. Infrared or foot-operated taps can save water by using short bursts of water for rinsing in a kitchen or bathroom. Apart from businesses, water-saving steam sterilizers can be used in hospitals and health care facilities.

A technique that is not an innovation but is helpful in preserving water is exterior messages that lead one to save water. For example, in a study conducted in 2014 showed that when an individual is exposed to a message regarding saving water they are inclined to save water. As the outcome of a survey, done in 2016, that asked people how likely they are to conserve water it was found that education in the topic played a big part in the person's decision.

It is important to consider implementing water-conserving changes to industrial and commercial application use. It was found that high-income countries use roughly 59% of their water for industrial usage while low-income countries use 8% for industrial usage. One big change that industrial and commercial companies can implement are to improve the assessment and maintenance of water systems. It is easy to add water-efficient applications but it is the proper maintenance and inspection of it which will lead to long-term changes. A water conservation plan can be created, including adding various goals and benchmarks for both the employees and the company. Another change that industrial and commercial companies can make are to check water-consuming systems at regular intervals for any leaks or problems. By doing this, it will ensure that water is not unnecessarily being lost and there is no excess money being spent on utility bills. A third change that industrial and commercial companies can implement is installing a rain sensor. This sensor should be able to detect when precipitation is occurring and stop the program which would normally irrigate the land. After the rain ends, the sensor should turn the program back on and resume to its normal watering cycle.

=== Agricultural applications ===
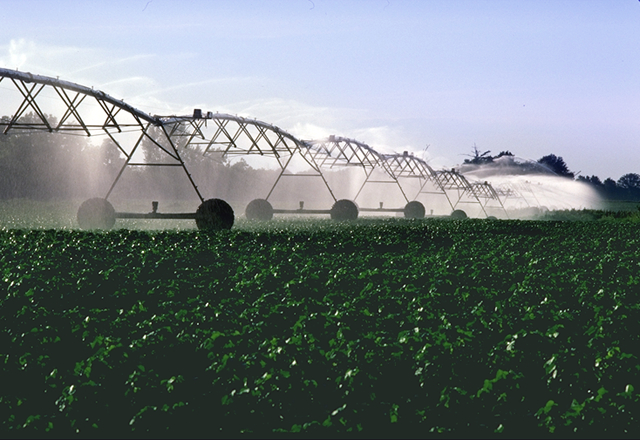
Overhead irrigation, center-pivot design

Water is an essential part of irrigation. Plants always take a lot of ground water thus ground water should be replenished. There are two types of water in agriculture which are blue and green water. Blue water is the liquid water above and below the ground while green water is the portion of water that is directly used and evaporated by rainfed agriculture. Although both of them are viewed as renewable only the blue water is assessed.

For crop irrigation, optimal water efficiency means minimizing losses due to evaporation, runoff, or subsurface drainage while maximizing production. An evaporation pan in combination with specific crop correction factors can be used to determine how much water is needed to satisfy plant requirements. Flood irrigation, the oldest and most common type, is often very uneven in distribution, as parts of a field may receive excess water in order to deliver sufficient quantities to other parts. Overhead irrigation, using center-pivot or lateral-moving sprinklers, has the potential for a much more equal and controlled distribution pattern. Drip irrigation is the most expensive and least-used type, but offers the ability to deliver water to plant roots with minimal losses. However, drip irrigation is increasingly affordable, especially for the home gardener and in light of rising water rates. Using drip irrigation methods can save up to 30,000 gallons of water per year when replacing irrigation systems that spray in all directions. There are also cheap effective methods similar to drip irrigation such as the use of soaking hoses that can even be submerged in the growing medium to eliminate evaporation.

As changing irrigation systems can be a costly undertaking, conservation efforts often concentrate on maximizing the efficiency of the existing system. This may include chiselling compacted soils, creating furrow dikes to prevent runoff, and using soil moisture and rainfall sensors to optimize irrigation schedules. Usually large gains in efficiency are possible through measurement and more effective management of the existing irrigation system. The 2011 UNEP Green Economy Report notes that "[i]mproved soil organic matter from the use of green manures, mulching, and recycling of crop residues and animal manure increases the water holding capacity of soils and their ability to absorb water during torrential rains", which is a way to optimize the use of rainfall and irrigation during dry periods in the season.

As seen in China, plastic mulch also has the potential to conserve water in agricultural practices. The "mulch" is really a thin sheet of plastic that is placed over the soil. There are holes in the plastic for the plants to grow through. Some studies have shown that plastic mulch conserves water by reducing the evaporation of soil moisture, however, there have not been enough applied studies to determine the total water savings that this practice may bring about.

=== Water reuse ===
Water shortage has become an increasingly difficult problem to manage. More than 40% of the world's population live in a region where the demand for water exceeds its supply. The imbalance between supply and demand, along with persisting issues such as climate change and population growth, has made water reuse a necessary method for conserving water. There are a variety of methods used in the treatment of waste water to ensure that it is safe to use for irrigation of food crops and/or drinking water.

Seawater desalination requires more energy than the desalination of fresh water. Despite this, many seawater desalination plants have been built in response to water shortages around the world. This makes it necessary to evaluate the impacts of seawater desalination and to find ways to improve desalination technology. Current research involves the use of experiments to determine the most effective and least energy intensive methods of desalination.

Sand filtration is another method used to treat water. Recent studies show that sand filtration needs further improvements, but it is approaching optimization with its effectiveness at removing pathogens from water. Sand filtration is very effective at removing protozoa and bacteria, but struggles with removing viruses. Large-scale sand filtration facilities also require large surface areas to accommodate them.

The removal of pathogens from recycled water is of high priority because wastewater always contains pathogens capable of infecting humans. The levels of pathogenic viruses have to be reduced to a certain level in order for recycled water to not pose a threat to human populations. Further research is necessary to determine more accurate methods of assessing the level of pathogenic viruses in treated wastewater.

== Problems ==
=== Public perception of water reuse ===
Answers to a survey of public perception of water shortages, conducted in 2014, showed that people were not likely to use recycled water for consumption due to fear. However, those who are more educated on water conservation chose the "likely" option to using recycled water. Another survey, undertaken in 2021, found that some people "chose not to choose" due to fear of infection or sickness. Researchers believe people went for the neutral option because they still wanted to choose an "environmentally friendly" option.

=== Wasting of water ===
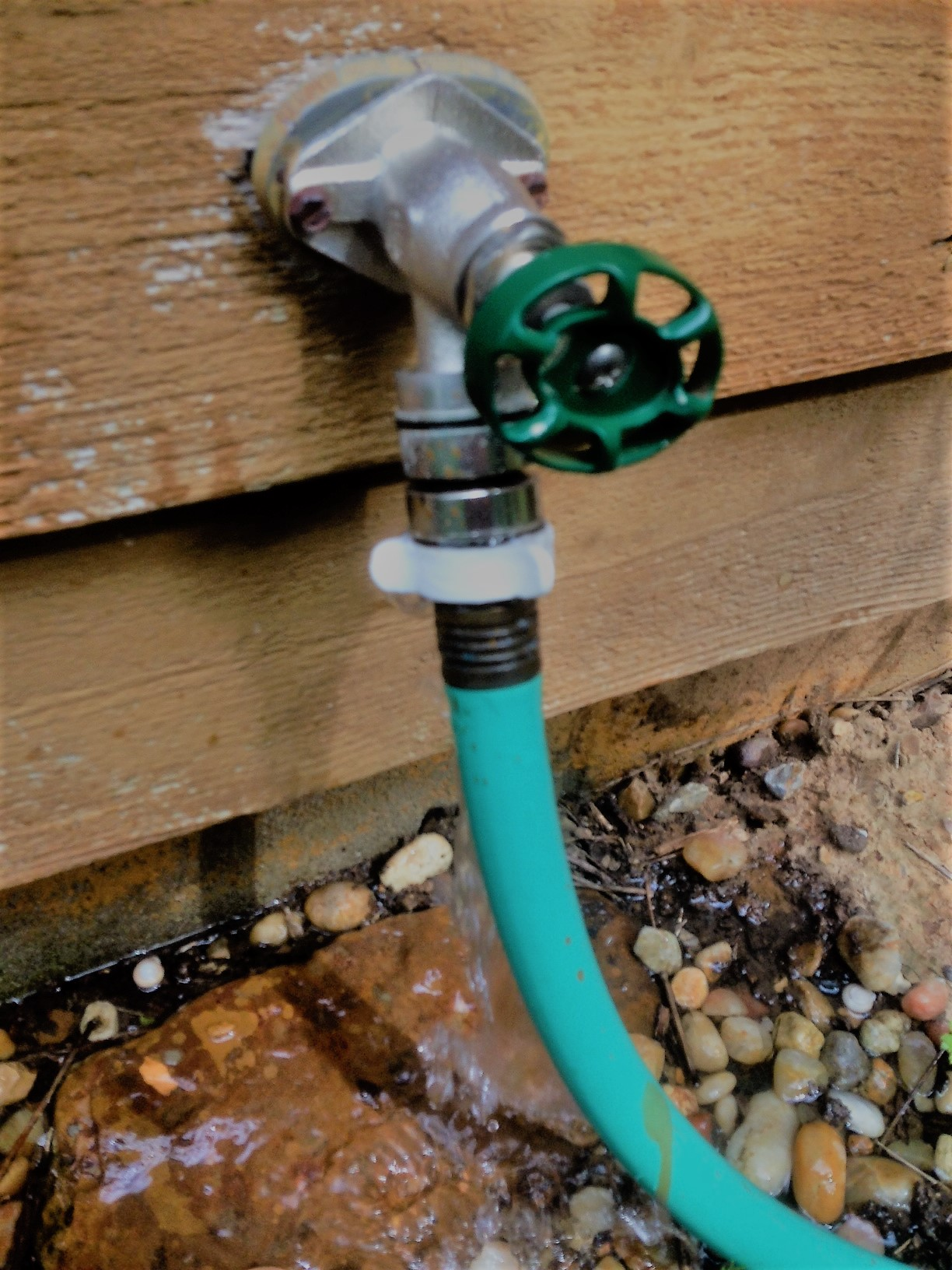
Leaking garden hose bib

Wasting water is the flip side of water conservation, and in household applications, it means causing or permitting water discharge without any practical purpose. Inefficient water use is also considered wasteful. According to EPA estimate, household leaks in the US can waste approximately 900 billion gallons (3.4 billion cubic meters) of water annually nationwide. Generally, water management agencies are reluctant or unwilling to give a concrete definition to a relatively vague concept of water waste.

However, definition of water waste is often given in local drought emergency ordinances. One example refers to any acts or omissions, whether willful or negligent, that are "causing or permitting water to leak, discharge, flow or run to waste into any gutter, sanitary sewer, watercourse or public or private storm drain, or to any adjacent property, from any tap, hose, faucet, pipe, sprinkler, pond, pool, waterway, fountain or nozzle." In this example, the city code also clarifies that "in the case of washing, "discharge," "flow" or "run to waste" means that water in excess of that necessary to wash, wet or clean the dirty or dusty object, such as an automobile, sidewalk, or parking area, flows to waste.

Water utilities (and other media sources) often provide listings of wasteful water-use practices and prohibitions of wasteful uses. Examples include utilities in San Antonio, Texas, Las Vegas, Nevada, California Water Service company in California, and City of San Diego, California. The City of Palo Alto in California enforces permanent water use restrictions on wasteful practices such as leaks, runoff, irrigating during and immediately after rainfall, and use of potable water when non-potable water is available. Similar restrictions are in effect in the State of Victoria, Australia. Temporary water use bans (also known as "hosepipe bans") are used in England, Scotland, Wales and Northern Ireland.

Strictly speaking, water that is discharged into the sewer, or directly to the environment is not wasted or lost. It remains within the hydrologic cycle and returns to the land surface and surface water bodies as precipitation. However, in many cases, the source of the water is at a significant distance from the return point and may be in a different catchment. The separation between extraction point and return point can represent significant environmental degradation in the watercourse and riparian strip. What is "wasted" is the community's supply of water that was captured, stored, transported and treated to drinking quality standards. Efficient use of water saves the expense of water supply provision and leaves more fresh water in lakes, rivers and aquifers for other users and also for supporting ecosystems. For example, we should not treat toilet as a trash can. If we flush cigarette butts or tissues in it, we are wasting gallons of water. Because the process of recycling water cannot be accomplished.

A concept that is closely related to water wasting is "water-use efficiency". Water use is considered inefficient if the same purpose of its use can be accomplished with less water. Technical efficiency derives from engineering practice where it is typically used to describe the ratio of output to input and is useful in comparing various products and processes. For example, one showerhead would be considered more efficient than another if it could accomplish the same purpose (i.e., of showering) by using less water or other inputs (e.g., lower water pressure). The technical efficiency concept is not useful in making decisions of investing money (or resources) in water conservation measures unless the inputs and outputs are measured in value terms. This expression of efficiency is referred to as economic efficiency and is incorporated into the concept of water conservation.

== See also ==
- Air well (condenser)
- Atmospheric water generator
- Berlin Rules on Water Resources
- Blue roof
- Conservation biology
- Deficit irrigation
- Environmental protection
- EPA WaterSense
- Irrigation tank
- Micro-sustainability
- Non-revenue water
- Outdoor water-use restriction
- Peak water
- Rainwater tank
- Retention basin
- Stormwater harvesting
- Sustainable agriculture
- Sustainable drainage system
- Water pinch analysis
- Water footprint
- Water-sensitive urban design
