= EPA WaterSense =

U.S. Environmental Protection Agency program

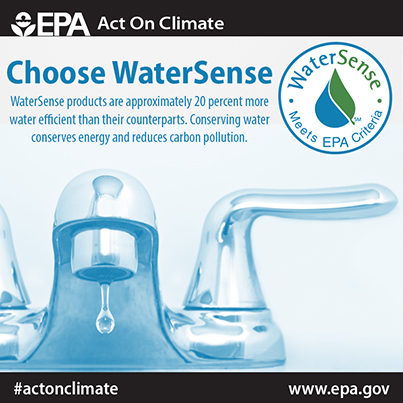
EPA poster publicizing WaterSense products

WaterSense is a program sponsored by the U.S. Environmental Protection Agency (EPA), designed to encourage water efficiency in the United States through the use of a special label on consumer products. The goal of this program is to protect the future of the U.S. water supply. WaterSense maintains partnerships with key utility, manufacturer and retail partners across the United States. WaterSense is a voluntary, rather than a regulatory program. The EPA develops specifications for water-efficient products – low-flow fixtures – through a public process. If a manufacturer makes a product that meets those specifications, the product is eligible for third-party testing to ensure the stated efficiency and performance criteria have been met. If the product passes the test, the manufacturer is rewarded with the right to put the WaterSense label on that product.

== Background ==
WaterSense, established in 2006, is a voluntary program sponsored by the EPA as a by-product of the Energy Policy and Conservation Act (otherwise known as the Energy Policy Act, or EPACT92), enacted by the Congress in 1992. The initiative was in response to 42 U.S.C. §6295(j)-(k), which addresses the conservation of water supply in the United States. EPACT92 mandated new volume-based efficiency standards for toilets, showerheads and faucets as follows: toilets must be manufactured with a maximum flush volume of 1.6 gallons per flush (gpf); showerheads must be manufactured with a flow rate of 2.5 gallons per minute (gpm) at 80 pound-force per square inch (psi); and faucets must be manufactured with a flow rate no more than 2.5 gpm. These standards were required to take effect in January 1994, along with flow-rate labelling requirements and recommendations for the establishment of voluntary replacement programs.

In response to these recommendations, and in anticipation of similar impacts provided by the Energy Star program (on water conservation, rather than energy), the EPA launched WaterSense in 2006. The WaterSense label was designed to be voluntarily sought out by manufacturers, and requires that water fixtures use at least 20% less than the federally mandated standards as established by EPACT92. Using the efficiency standards established by EPACT92 as a baseline, the EPA instituted the following flow-rate guidelines for WaterSense: toilets must be manufactured with a maximum flush volume of 1.28 gpf; showerheads must have a maximum flow-rate of 2.0 gpm at 80 psi; and bathroom faucets must be manufactured with a low-flow volume rate of 1.5 gpm. Low-flow toilets were the first products to receive the WaterSense label in 2007, followed by bathroom sink faucets in October of that same year.

The objective of the program is to educate consumers on water conservation and to promote the WaterSense label. The program was originally designed to promote consumer products (namely, low-flow water fixtures). The program has since expanded to the certification of homes and accreditation of irrigation professionals. EPA issued its most recent specification for weather-based irrigation controllers in 2021. A draft specification for soil moisture-based irrigation control technologies was issued in 2019. Specifications for pre-rinse spray valves and water softeners started development as of 2011. In June 2014, WaterSense began the certification of homes, designed to use 20% less water than standard new construction, as well as the accreditation of irrigation professionals for the installation, maintenance, design and auditing of systems. The home certification program, called the WaterSense "New Home Specification" program, specifies criteria for residential indoor and outdoor water use, as well as homeowner education. Version 2.0 of "WaterSense Specification for Homes" was issued in 2021.

Between the years of 2006 and 2020, the EPA projected that its water conservation program has saved approximately 5.3 trillion gallons of water and 603 billion kilowatt hours of electricity from power required to distribute and handle water. Although EPACT92 was the impetus for this initiative, the WaterSense program currently operates under a number of congressional authorities, such as the Clean Water Act and the Safe Drinking Water Act.

In 2016, a number of proposals were introduced by the 114th Congress to expand the WaterSense program, but no consensus was reached on the proposals. In 2018, the 115th Congress made amendments to the program in Section 4306 of America's Water Infrastructure Act (AWIA) of 2018. The EPA had no legal authority over WaterSense or its specifications until the enactment of the AWIA. Section 4306 of AWIA mandates that these specifications "must reduce water use, decrease strain on water systems, conserve energy, and preserve water resources." The AWIA requires the EPA to enforce these specifications, although the program is still voluntary, and to update them every six years. In addition to the previously existing parameters of the program, the Act also encourages the EPA to expand the program beyond water conservation to promote technology for the treatment, reuse and recycling of non-potable water.

== Product and service specifications ==
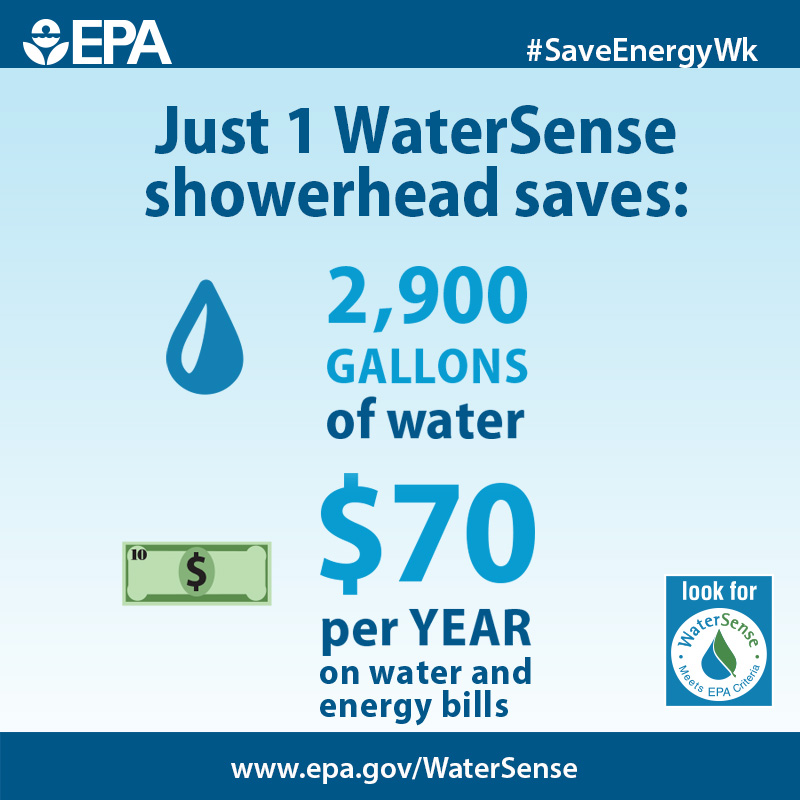
Poster promoting WaterSense showerheads

Consumer products, such as residential and commercial toilets; bathroom faucets (and accessories); urinals; showerheads; irrigation controllers; and spray sprinkler bodies are eligible for receiving the WaterSense label. Residential new construction is also able to receive the WaterSense "Homes Specification" certification and irrigation professionals who have undergone training by WaterSense-labeled certification program can receive accreditation.

Products that seek the WaterSense label must:

- Enter a preliminary screening process conducted by WaterSense staff;
- Be at least 20% more efficient, without any performance variances (compared to their conventional equivalent);
- Have potential for national impact (favored over regionally-available products);
- Be evaluated for ease of installation by consumer, as well as cost-effectiveness;
- Undergo third-part certification process paid for by the manufacturer.

Note: Products do not require recertification, but 15% of all labeled products are audited annually by the EPA.

Homes that seek certification must be at least 30% more efficient than a conventional new home and also meet homeowner expectations for performance.

The EPA administers educational material and exams to allow irrigation professionals to WaterSense accreditation. Exams must be renewed every two years to maintain credit.

== Partnerships ==
EPA recruits partners in several different categories including:

- Utilities, communities, state and local governments
- Manufacturers
- Retailers and distributors
- Home builders
- Organizations that provide qualified certification programs
- Non-profit organizations and trade associations.

Partner responsibilities include:

- Promoting WaterSense as well as water efficiency
- Adhering to WaterSense partner logo guidelines
- Providing annual data
- Granting EPA rights to use partner name on the Agency website or alongside other program promotional efforts.

WaterSense also utilizes promotional partners who endorse and publicize the program among their constituents. Promotional partners include utilities, state and local governments, trade associations, and other non-governmental organizations.

== Quantifying the impact ==
The EPA requires that all manufacturer and retailer/distributor partners provide data on their distribution and activities regarding WaterSense product shipment, sales and outreach. Lawrence Berkeley National Laboratory (LBNL) uses these data to create a National Water Savings (NWS) model to track water and energy savings. According to this model, consumers have saved 1.5 trillion gallons of water and $32.6 billion on utility bills. LBNL used these data to create an arithmetic model to estimate the impacts that WaterSense has had on water conservation in the United States. The model is the difference between the federally-mandated efficiency baseline for water fixtures and the efficiency of WaterSense labeled products that have been sold annually. This model is also responsible for determining the financial impacts of water savings for U.S. consumers.
