= Sink strainer =

Sieve to keep solids out of the plumbing system

In plumbing, a sink strainer is a type of perforated metal sieve or mesh strainer used to strain or filter out solid debris in the water system. Different varieties are used in residential premises and for industrial or commercial applications. Such strainer elements are generally made from stainless steel for corrosion resistance.

== Household use ==
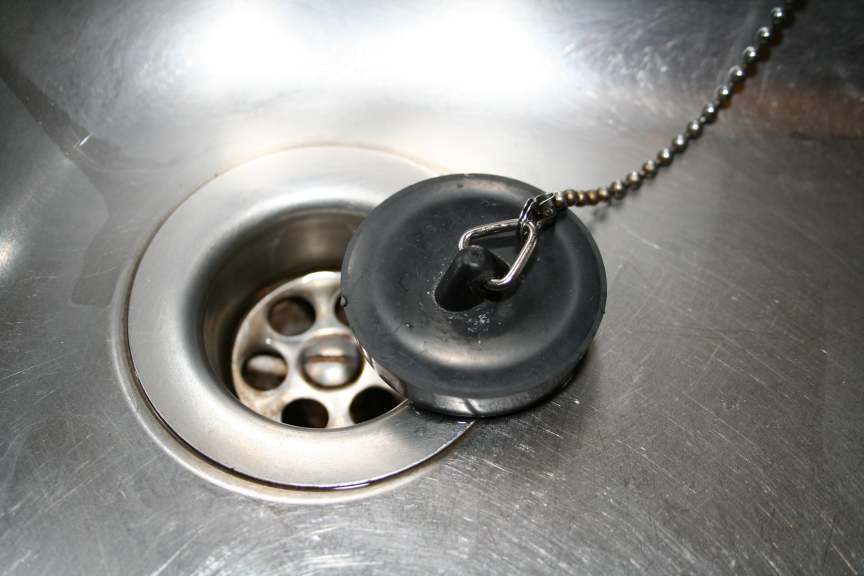
A sink drain cover and a plastic sink plug

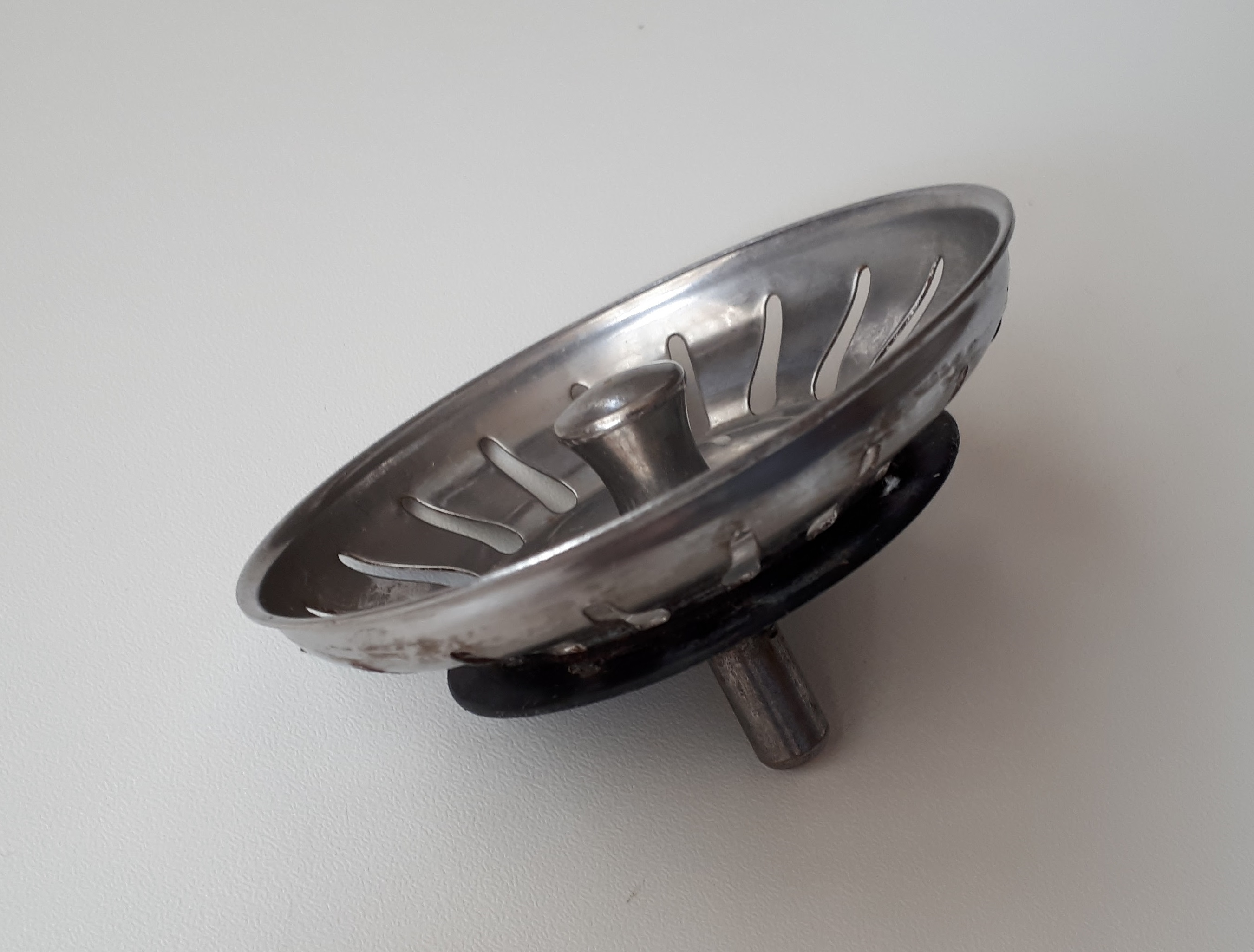
A sink strainer used to completely replace the sink drain cover.

In houses, sink strainers are often used as drain covers in sinks, showers and bathtubs.

Water lines or kitchen systems can get gravel, deposits that break free, and other stray items in the line. Due to the velocity of the water pushing them, they can severely damage or clog devices installed in the flow stream of the water line, for example p-traps or pipes. A strainer is essentially a screen installed to allow water to pass through, but not larger items. The larger items fall to the bottom or are held in a basket for later clean out. They normally have an access that allows for them to be cleaned or have the strainer plate or basket replaced.

Strainers come in several different styles based on the needs. A plate strainer is the simplest, in which water flows through a perforated plate. Often the plate is corrugated shape to increase surface area. A basket strainer is a design where the strainer is shaped like a basket and usually installed in a vertical system. The basket strainer is easier to clean, since debris is captured in the basket. It can also sometimes offer more straining surface area than a plate strainer, improving flow rates, or decreasing pressure loss through the strainer.

They can be made of stainless steel AISI 304, 202 etc.

== See also ==
- Water meter
- Water supply network
