= Trap primer =

Plumbing device or valve that adds water to traps

A trap primer (or trap seal primer) is a plumbing device or valve that adds water to traps. The water seals in traps are needed to prevent sewer gases from entering buildings, but because this water is exposed to the air, it is subject to evaporation over time in infrequently used floor drains, leading to the release of sewer gas into the environment. The trap primer mitigates this problem by injecting water, either directly or indirectly, into the trap to maintain the water seal indefinitely.

Building codes may require trap primers for traps in certain locations or situations, usually those in which industry experience has shown that they are likely to dry out. The most common requirement is for basement floor drains, which are only used when the basement floods. Sometimes they are also installed in locations where the plumbing code does not require a primer because of a high probability of the trap drying out, but because of a nearby ignition source and the explosion hazard in the event that the trap did leak sewer gas. Most designs require installation in an accessible location where periodic maintenance can be performed.

== Types ==
There are many types of trap primers. The simplest, typically for a floor drain's trap, is simply a connection from a nearby sink's drain so that when the sink is used, some of the water flow is diverted into one or more traps. More common is a primer that is connected to the potable water supply and activates when pressure fluctuations are sensed, such as the flushing of a nearby water closet. Others depend on occupancy sensors or timers. Several manufacturers produce laundry faucets with a built-in trap seal primer outlet.

== See also ==
- Piping and plumbing fittings
- Plumbing drainage venting
