= Bowl sink =

Previous term for the more commonly-known vessel sink

A bowl sink, the previous term for the more commonly known vessel sink, is a free-standing sink that sits directly on the counter-top or furniture on which it is mounted. Originally invented by Meredith Wolf, a former Rhode Island resident, the product serves as a conventional sink while providing a decorative feature. This type of sink is produced by numerous firms, and is found in many hotels, restaurants, and homes.
