= Sink-toilet =

Combination sink and toilet

A sink-toilet combination unit is sometimes used by prisons and militaries. Such units typically have no exposed pipes by which someone could hang himself. They are sometimes made of stainless steel for added durability. Sink-toilets are used at the Guantanamo Bay detention camp. Sink-toilets are also used in some homes as an environmentally friendly, water-saving option that, at the user's option, reuses waste water from the sink in the discharge of the cistern. Some sink toilets employ a filtration system to remove particles, debris, bacteria, and odors before the water is stored for flushing.
