= Water seal =

Water seal may refer to:

- Liquid trap seal in plumbing traps
- Underwater seal in pleural drainage apparatuses
- Waterproofing
