= Buchan trap =

Plumbing device

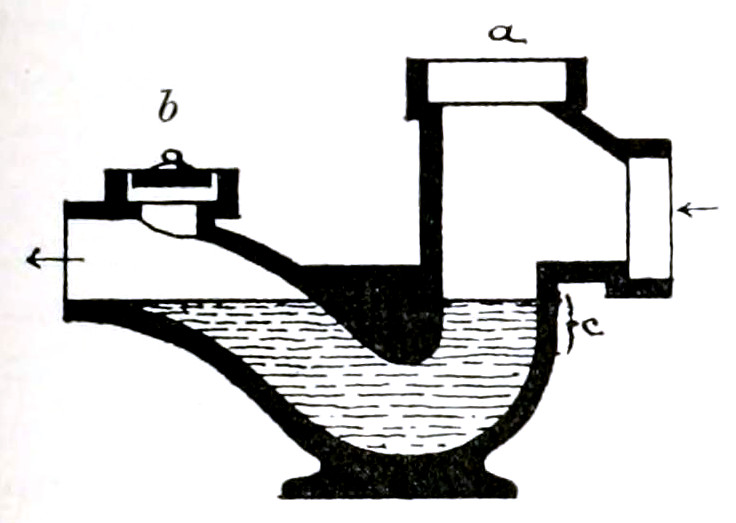
A Buchan trap, with arrows showing the flow of wastewater.: 1. air inlet; 2. inspection eye-hole; 3. extent of water seal

A Buchan trap (alternative names: Bristol interceptor, interceptor trap and disconnecting trap) is a device fitted in a domestic sewer pipe to prevent odours entering the pipe from the public sewer and permeating the house, a common problem before individual plumbing fittings were separately trapped.

The trap is made from fireclay and uses a water seal to prevent air passing from the sewer to the pipe. Waste flows from the house through a U-bend in the trap. This means that there is always water in the pipe preventing the passage of anything from the other direction. The device is a large clay U-bend with an air-inlet/access point on the 'house' side. It is located below the ground level, but can be accessed through the air-inlet and sometimes a rodding hole.

== Blockage risk ==
The Buchan trap will collect solids, sludge and waste that is not in suspension. In recent times, non-paper based wipes have posed a particular problem, according to most water authorities, with the potential to create a partial or complete blockage. The sewage and rainwater then backs up the pipe and exits from the lowest connected appliance (sink, bath, dish washer, washing machine, etc.).

This can be a significant problem in multi-level dwellings (e.g. tenements) where those at the lowest level will receive all the waste waters from those above. The problem is particularly acute when the Buchan trap is buried. Where they are accessible, they should be checked, and cleaned if required, on a recurring basis, such as annually.

== History ==
The Buchan trap was devised in the 19th century to stop the flow of sewer gases due to the miasma theory of disease. For example, it was believed that the disease cholera was an airborne infection, not waterborne. The Buchan trap is normally found in the bottom of manholes or drop-shafts. It normally denotes the end point of the domestic property's sewer before it joins the main public sewer.
