= Fount =

Fount can refer to:

- The traditional English spelling of the American English font (i.e., a typeface)
- A spring or fountain, and thus, metaphorically, a source of something beneficial (as in fount of knowledge, wisdom, etc.)
- FOUNT – a publication for Lutheran women
- A type of plumbing fixture
- Fount (imprint), an imprint of HarperCollins
