= Drain (plumbing) =

Vessel or conduit for unwanted water or waste liquids to be flumed away

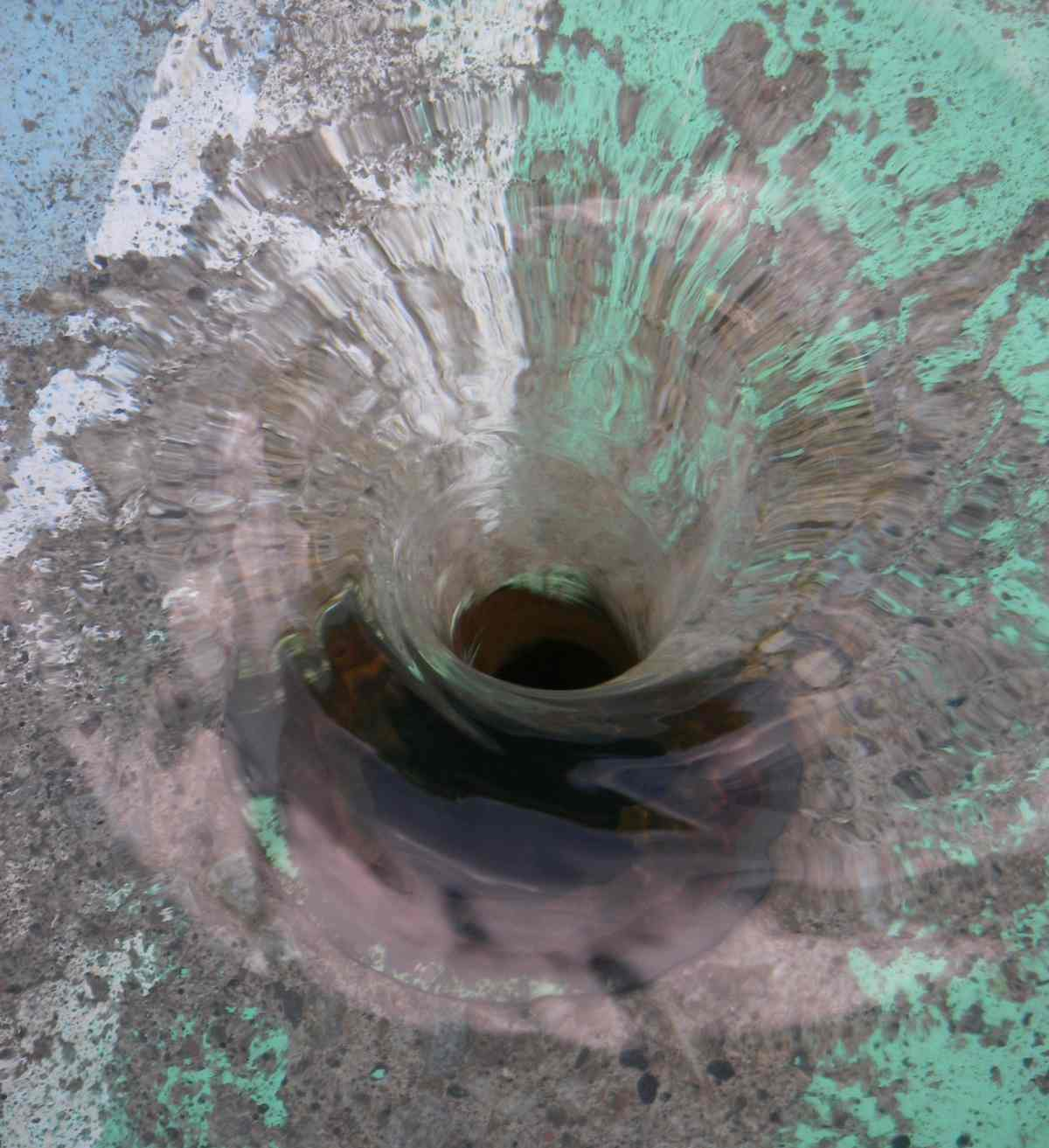
Pool drain vortex as viewed from above the water in a wading pool

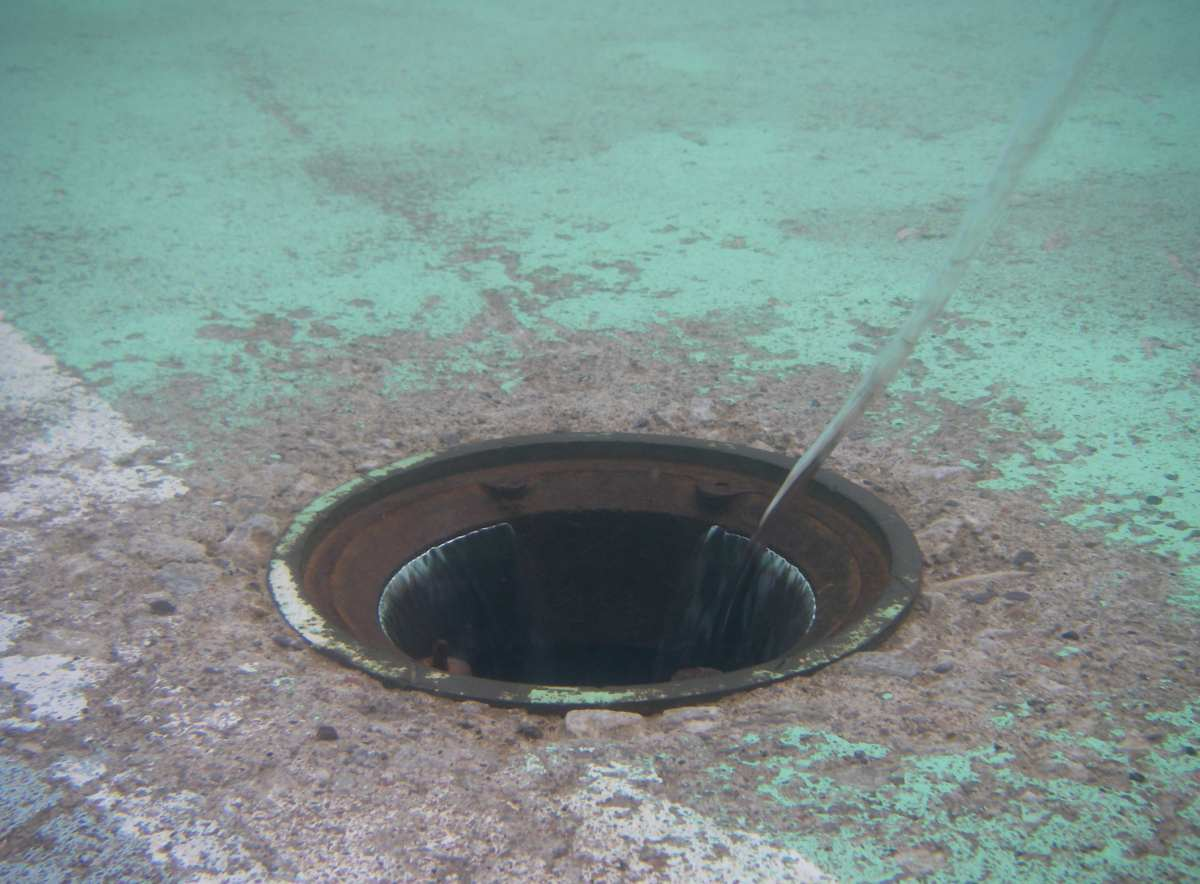
Underwater view of the same drain, showing vortex-formation phenomenon

A drain is the primary vessel or conduit for unwanted water or waste liquids to flow away, either to a more useful area, funnelled into a receptacle, or run into sewers or stormwater mains as waste discharge to be released or processed. In some countries a distinction is made between foul water drainage (which removes water from sinks, toilets and plumbed appliances etc.) and surface water drainage (which removes rainwater from surfaces).

== Design and materials ==
Drainage systems should be designed and may need to be approved by a planning control expert. Drainage systems can be subject to regulations, depending on the jurisdiction. Drainage systems include modular components that connect to other systems (such as guttering) in order to transport the collected water to another location where it can be disposed of. Pipes are made of materials such as vitrified clay and uPVC. When foul water is flushed or flows away in a building, it should initially go through a trap that uses a water seal to prevent gases from being able to come into the building via the drains and sewers the drainage system is connected to.

== Drain covers ==
A drain cover is a cover with holes (e.g. a manhole) or a grating used to cover a drain, to prevent unwanted entry of foreign objects, or injury to people or animals. It allows drainage of liquids but prevents entry from large solid objects, and thus acts as a coarse filter. A sink drain cover is a drain cover used to cover the sink drain.

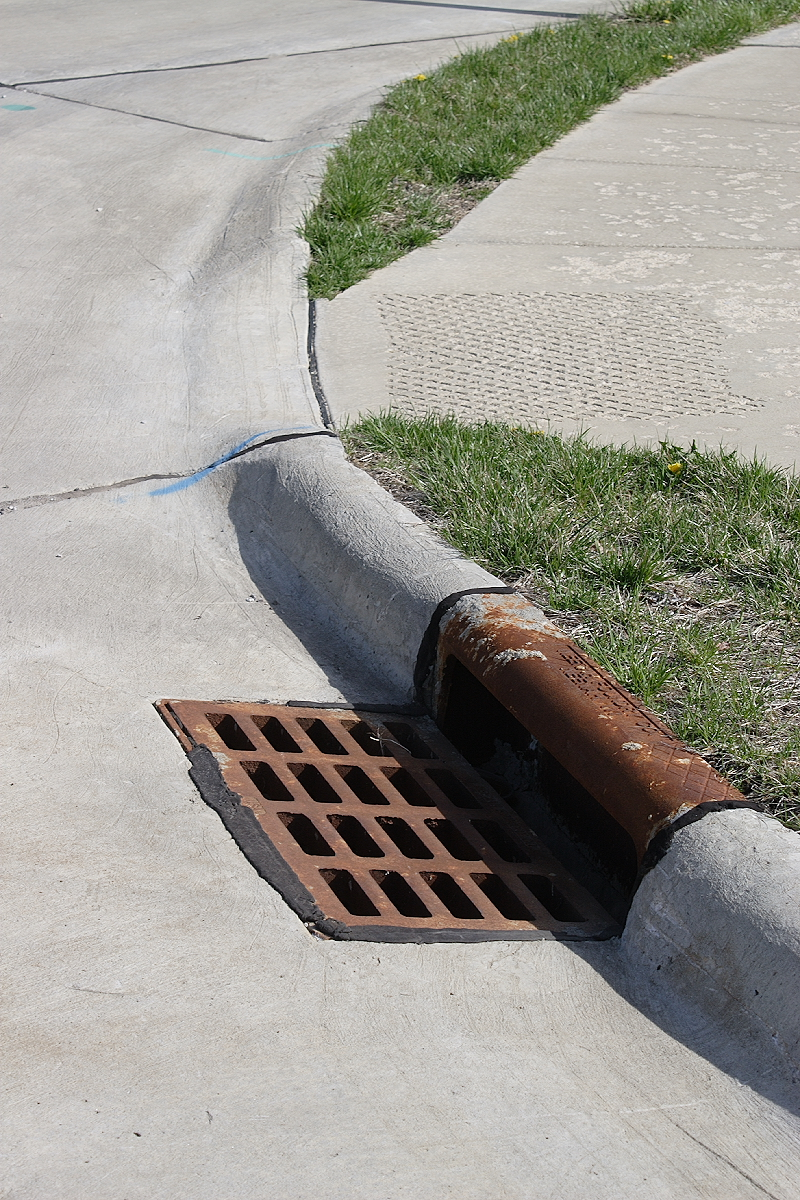
A metal grating covering a storm drain

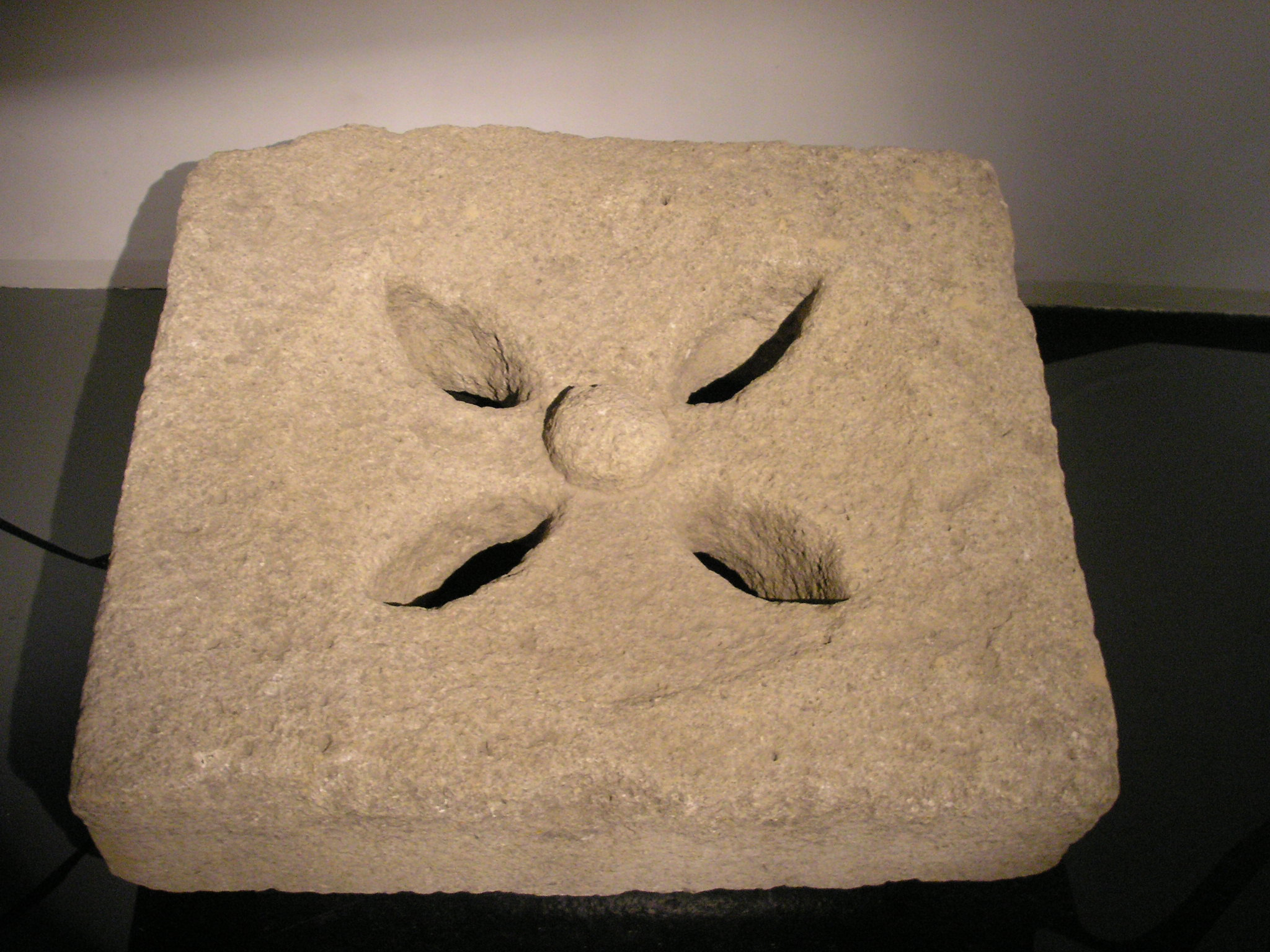
A stone drain cover, ancient Roman architecture at Vindobona, Austria

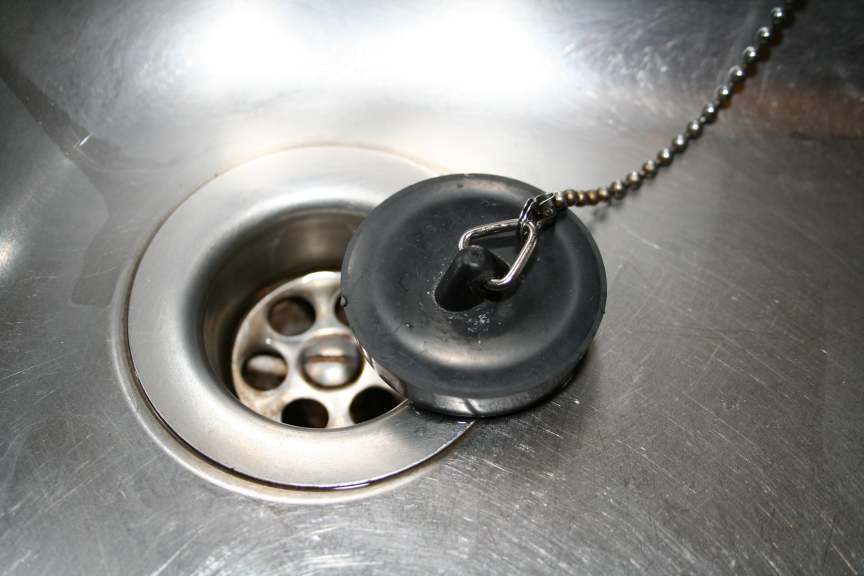
A sink drain cover and a plastic sink plug

== Maintenance ==
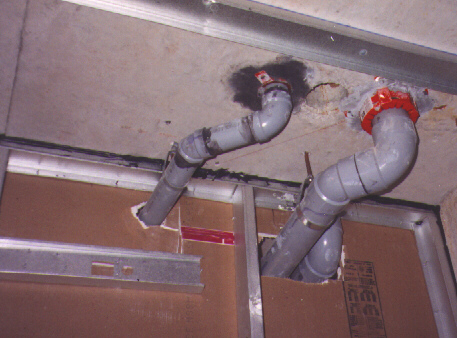
Pipes coming from drains

Blocked drains can occur in kitchens and bathrooms for a number of reasons including flushing wet wipes, due to an excessive amount of toilet paper being flushed and due to cooking fats entering the drainage system. In some cases, a chemical drain cleaner can clear the blockage. Other methods include using soda crystals, bicarbonate of soda and vinegar, plungers, taking pipework apart to manually remove what is blocking it, or hiring a plumber to clear the blockage. Blocked drains can cause problems and can lead to water supplies becoming contaminated, which can increase the likelihood of disease outbreaks.

== Standards ==
The American Society of Mechanical Engineers publishes the following standards:

- A112.6.3 – Floor and Trench Drains
- A112.6.4 – Roof, Deck, and Balcony Drains

In the UK, the Department for Environment, Food and Rural Affairs provide guidance called the national standards for sustainable drainage systems (SuDS), for surface water drainage. These systems attempt to recreate natural water drainage systems, reduce flooding and improve water quality. There are also British Standards guidelines specific to drains, such as BS EN 14654‑1.

== Swimming pool drainage safety ==
=== Swimming pools and fountains ===
In systems such as swimming pools or fountains where waste fluid is recirculated, the drain is the input to the Recirculating Pumping machine. These fixtures can be very dangerous because people do not expect to encounter the suction this creates from the drain.

Fatalities have occurred around drains as a result of suction entrapment (also known as pool suction-drain injury). In these situations, a portion of the body, hair, or clothing may become stuck against the drain and may become impossible to release, resulting in drowning. For example, in 1994, Cristin Fitzpatrick drowned in a Variety Village swimming pool when her hair became entangled in a water funnel.

=== Legislation ===
On December 19, 2007, the national Virginia Graeme Baker Pool and Spa Safety Act was passed into law in the US. This law seeks to bring an end to suction entrapment related injuries and deaths by incorporating consumer protection regulation of pool and spa drains.

== See also ==
- Domestic water system
- Drain (HVAC)
- Drainage system (disambiguation)
- Piping and plumbing fitting
- Plumbing
- Plumbing drainage venting
- Septic system
- Sewage collection and disposal
- Trench drain (Channel drain)
