= Plug (sanitation) =

Object used to close a drainage outlet

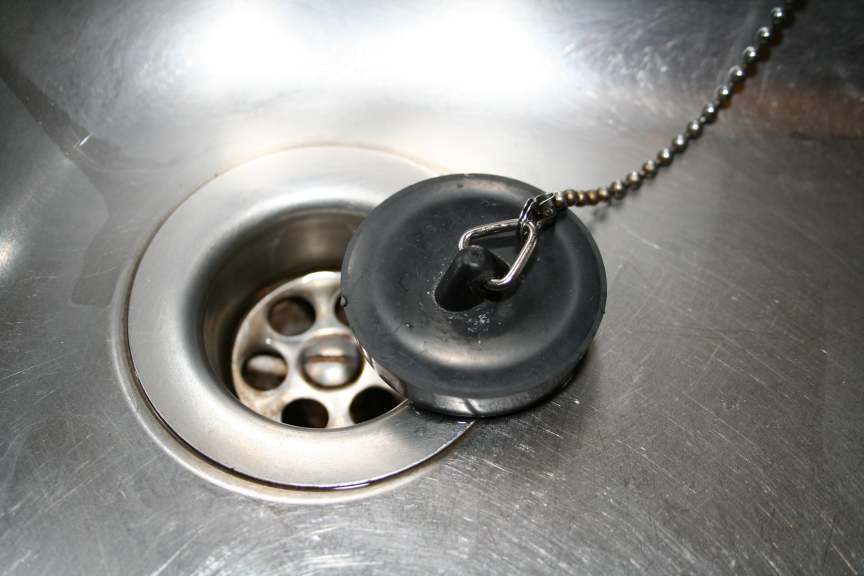
Plug for a sink

A plug in sanitation is an object that is used to close a drainage outlet firmly.

The insertion of a plug into a drainage outlet allows the container to be filled with water or other fluids. In contrast to screw on caps, plugs are pushed into the hole and are not put over the hole.

Plugs are most commonly encountered in the bathroom or kitchen, for use in bathtubs, wash basins or sinks.

== Traditional plugs ==
Typically plugs are made from a soft material, such as rubber, or have a soft outer rim, so that they can be fitted to holes slightly smaller than their diameter; this ensures a tight seal. They are often connected by a ball chain which ensures the plug may be pulled from the drain with relative ease.

== Pop-up plugs ==
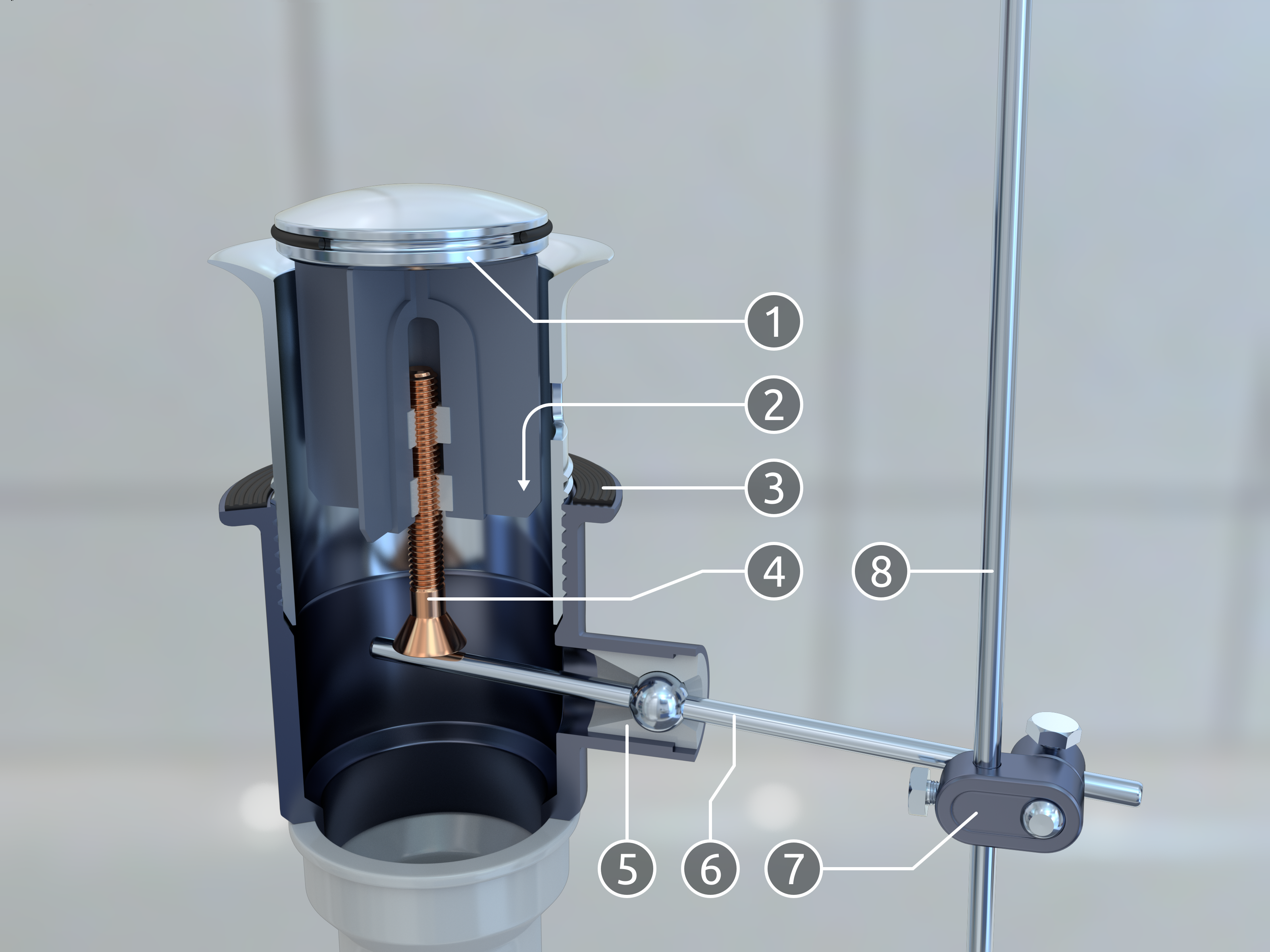
1. Valve plate with gasket; 2. Inlet from basin overflow; 3. Sealing rim; 4. Screw for height adjustment; 5. Ball joint; 6. Actuator arm; 7. Joint; 8. Control arm

Some modern plugholes dispense with the need for a separate plug, having instead a built-in 'pop-up plug' operated by a handle on the sink, that can move up or down to open or close the plughole.

== See also ==
- Pipe plug
