= Drainage system =

Drainage system may refer to:

- Drainage system (geomorphology), patterns formed by streams, rivers, and lakes in a drainage basin
- Drainage system (agriculture), a system by which water is drained on or in the soil to enhance production
- Sustainable drainage system, designed to reduce the potential impact of development

== See also ==
- Drainage
- Storm drain
- Tile drainage
- Watertable control
