= Sewer gas =

Gases produced and collected in sewer systems

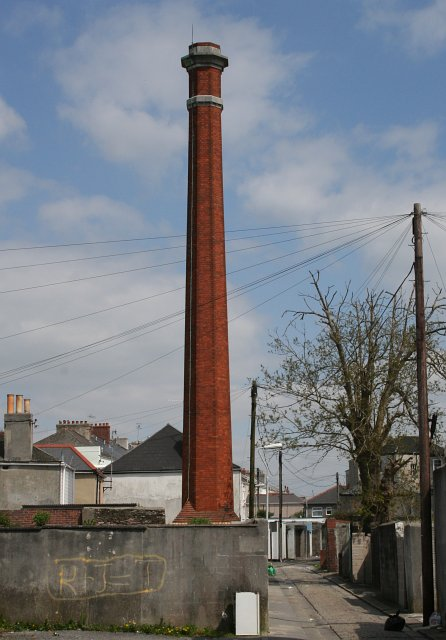
An old sewer gas chimney in Stonehouse, Plymouth, England, built in the 1880s to disperse sewer gas above residents

Sewer gas is a complex, generally obnoxious smelling mixture of toxic and nontoxic gases produced and collected in sewage systems by the decomposition of organic household or industrial wastes, typical components of sewage.

Sewer gases may include hydrogen sulfide, ammonia, methane, esters, carbon monoxide, sulfur dioxide and nitrogen oxides. Improper disposal of petroleum products such as gasoline and mineral spirits contribute to sewer gas hazards. Sewer gases are of concern due to their odor, health effects, and potential for creating fire or explosions.

== In homes ==
Sewer gas is typically restricted from entering buildings through plumbing traps that create a water seal at potential points of entry. In addition, plumbing vents allow sewer gases to be exhausted outdoors. Infrequently used plumbing fixtures may allow sewer gas to enter a home due to evaporation of water in the trap, especially in warm weather. The result is the most common means of sewer gas entering buildings and can be solved easily by using the fixtures regularly or adding water to their drains. One of the most common traps to dry out are floor drains such as those typically placed near home furnaces, water heaters and rooms with underfloor heating. Infrequently used utility sinks, tubs, showers, and restrooms also are common culprits. Trap primers are available that automatically add water to remote or little used traps such as these. Blocked plumbing vents, typically at the roof, also can cause water seals to fail via siphoning of the water.

Exposure to sewer gas also can happen if the gas seeps in via a leaking plumbing drain or vent pipe, or even through cracks in a building's foundation. Sewer gas is typically denser than atmospheric gases and may accumulate in basements, but may eventually mix with surrounding air. Individuals who work in sanitation industries or on farms might be exposed on the job if they clean or maintain municipal sewers, manure storage tanks, or septic tanks.

In buildings with HVAC air handlers that admit outside air for ventilation, plumbing vents placed too closely to air intakes or windows can be a source of sewer gas odors. In some cases airflow around buildings and wind effects may contribute to sewer gas odor problems even with appropriately separated vents and air intakes. Increasing vent heights, adding vent pipe filters, or providing powered dilution and exhaust can help reduce occurrences.

== History ==
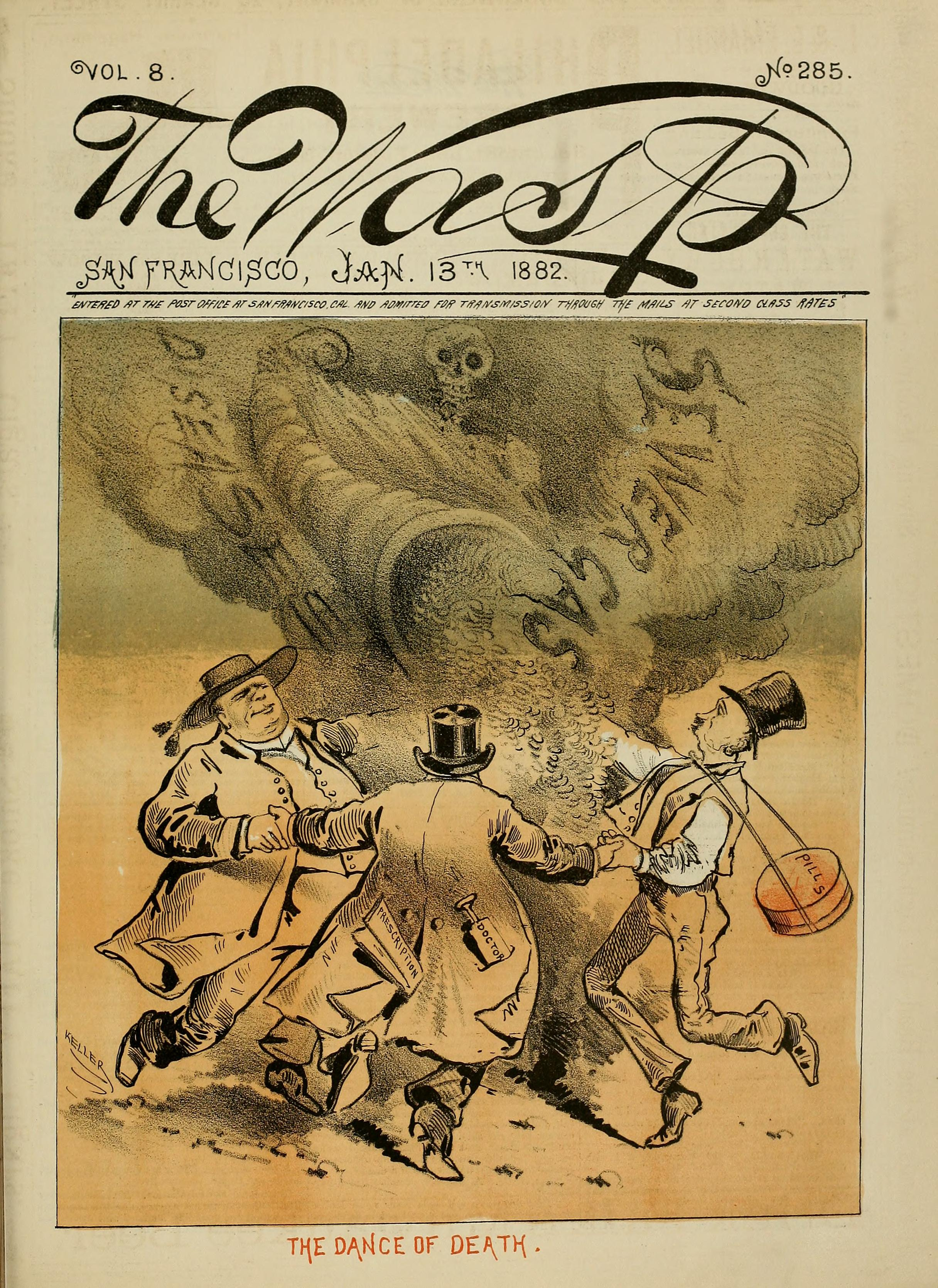
The cover of an 1882 issue of The Wasp, with an illustration linking sewer gas and disease

During the mid-nineteenth century, when indoor plumbing was being developed, it was a common belief that disease was caused largely by miasmas, or literally "polluted air." (Malaria, a disease spread by mosquitoes that breed in marshy areas, got its name from the Italian words for "bad air" because people initially blamed it on marsh gas.) Originally, traps in drain pipes were designed to help keep this bad air from passing back into living spaces within buildings. However, during the Broad Street cholera outbreak in London, in the summer of 1854, physician John Snow, among others, worked to prove that polluted water was the culprit, not the foul smells from sewage pipes or other sources. Subsequently, even as the germ theory of disease developed, society was slow to accept the idea that odors from sewers were relatively harmless when it came to the spread of disease.

== Health effects ==
In most homes, sewer gas may have an unpleasant odor, but does not often pose a significant health hazard. Residential sewer pipes primarily contain the gases found in air (nitrogen, oxygen, carbon dioxide, etc.). Often, methane is the gas of next highest concentration, but typically remains at nontoxic levels, especially in properly vented systems. However, if sewer gas has a distinct “rotten egg” smell, especially in sewage mains, septic tanks, or other sewage treatment facilities, it may be due to hydrogen sulfide content, which can be detected by human olfactory senses in concentrations as low as parts per billion. Exposure to low levels of this chemical can irritate the eyes, cause a cough or sore throat, shortness of breath, and fluid accumulation in the lungs. Prolonged low-level exposure may cause fatigue, pneumonia, loss of appetite, headaches, irritability, poor memory, and dizziness. High concentrations of hydrogen sulfide (>150 ppm) can produce olfactory fatigue, whereby the scent becomes undetectable. At higher concentrations (>300 ppm), hydrogen sulfide can cause loss of consciousness and death. Very high concentrations (>1000 ppm) can result in immediate collapse, occurring after a single breath.

== Explosion risk ==
Sewer gas can contain methane and hydrogen sulfide, both highly flammable and potentially explosive substances. As such, ignition of the gas is possible with flame or sparks. The methane concentration in open sewers is lower (7 to 15 ppmv) than the closed drains (up to 300 ppmv) in samples collected 2 cm (0.8 in) above the level of sewage.

== Greenhouse gas contribution ==
Fully vented sewer gases contribute to greenhouse gas emissions. Septic vent pipes can be fitted with filters that remove some odors.

Sewer gas can be used as a power source, thus reducing the consumption of fossil fuels. The gas is piped into a cleaning system and then used as a fuel to power a generator or combined heat and power (CHP) plant.

== Impact on sewerage ==
Gases present in sewerage can strongly impact material durability due to the action of microorganisms. The most deleterious one is associated to hydrogen sulfide that can result in biogenic sulfide corrosion or microbial corrosion. In worst cases, it may lead to the collapse of the structure with significant cost for its rehabilitation.

== See also ==
- Fire protection
- Indoor air quality
- Louisville sewer explosions
- Plumbing
- Potable cold and hot water supply
- Rainwater, surface, and subsurface water drainage
- Septic systems
- Sewer gas destructor lamp
- Marsh gas
