= Drain-waste-vent system =

Plumbing fixture

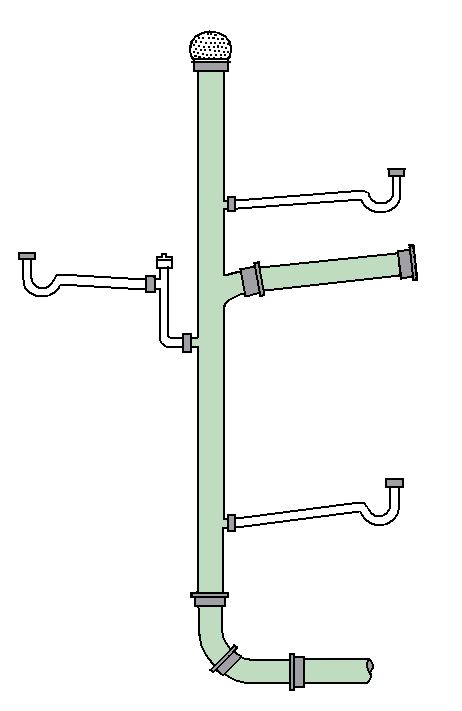
All plumbing fixtures are connected, directly or indirectly, to the soil stack ( ), which is connected at the bottom to the sanitary sewer or septic system and vented at the top. Each fixture ( ) has its own inline trap.

A drain-waste-vent system (or DWV) is the combination of pipes and plumbing fittings that captures sewage and greywater within a structure and routes it toward a water treatment system. It includes venting to the exterior environment to prevent a vacuum from forming and impeding fixtures such as sinks, showers, and toilets from draining freely, and employs water-filled traps to block sewer gasses from entering a plumbed structure.

DWV systems capture both sewage and greywater within a structure and safely route it out via the low point of its "soil stack" to a waste treatment system, either via a municipal sanitary sewer system, or to a septic tank and leach field. (Cesspits are generally prohibited in developed areas.) For such drainage systems to work properly it is crucial that neutral air pressure be maintained within all pipes, allowing free gravity flow of water and sewage through drains. It is critical that a sufficient fall gradient (downward slope) be maintained throughout the drain pipes to keep liquids and entrained solids flowing freely from a building towards the main drain. In situations where a downward slope out of a building en route to a treatment system cannot be created, a special collection sump pit and grinding lift "sewage ejector" pump are needed. By contrast, potable water supply systems are pressurized up to 50 pounds per square inch (340 kPa) or more and so do not require a continuous downward slope in their piping to distribute water through buildings.

Every fixture is required to have an internal or external trap to prevent sewer gases from entering a structure. Double trapping is prohibited by plumbing codes due to its susceptibility to clogging. In the U.S., every plumbing fixture must also be coupled to the system's vent piping. Without a vent, negative pressure can slow the flow of water leaving the system, resulting in clogs, or cause siphonage to empty a trap. The high point of the vent system (the top of its "soil stack") must be open to the exterior at atmospheric pressure. On large systems, separate parallel vent stacks may also be run to ensure sufficient airflow, because the number of devices linked to an atmospheric vent, and their distances from it, are regulated by plumbing code.

== Operation ==
A sewer pipe is normally at neutral air pressure compared to the surrounding atmosphere. When a column of waste water flows through a pipe, it compresses air ahead of it in the system, creating a positive pressure that must be released so it does not push back on the waste stream and downstream traps, slow drainage, and induce potential clogs. As the column of water passes, air must also freely flow in behind the waste stream, or negative pressure results, which can siphon water out of a trap after it is passed and allow noxious sewer gases to enter a building. The extent of these pressure fluctuations is determined by the fluid volume of the waste discharge.

Generally, a toilet outlet has the shortest trap seal, making it most vulnerable to being emptied by induced siphonage.

An additional risk of pressurizing a system ahead of a waste stream is the potential for it to overwhelm a downstream trap and force tainted water into its fixture. Serious hygiene and health consequences can result. Tall buildings of three or more stories are particularly susceptible to this problem. Adequate supplementary vent stacks are installed in parallel to waste stacks to allow proper venting in large and tall buildings and eliminate these pressure-related venting problems.

== External venting ==
DWV systems are vented directly through the building roof. Increasingly DWV pipe is ABS or PVC DWV-rated plastic pipe equipped with a flashing at the roof penetration to prevent rainwater from entering the buildings. Older structures may use asbestos, copper, iron, lead or clay pipes, in rough order of era of use.

Under many older building codes, a vent stack (a pipe leading to the main roof vent) is required to be within approx. a 5-foot (1.5 m) radius of the draining fixture it serves (sink, toilet, shower stall, etc.). To allow a single roof penetration as permitted by local building code, sub-vents may be tied together inside the building and exit via a common vent stack, frequently the "main" vent. Adding a vent connection within a long horizontal run with little slope will aid flow, and when used with a cleanout allows for better serviceability.

Unlike traps for other fixtures, toilet traps are usually designed to self-siphon to ensure complete evacuation of their contents; toilet bowls are then automatically refilled by a special valve mechanism.

== Internal venting ==
In exceptional cases it is either not possible or inconvenient to vent a fixture or fixtures externally. In such cases a resort to "internal venting" may be viable, where compliant with local plumbing codes. Such alternatives include mechanical vents (also called cheater vents) such as air admittance valves and check vents, and "plumb-arounds" such as an inline vent employed in kitchen islands and similar applications:

- Air admittance valves (AAVs, or commonly referred to in the UK as Durgo valves and in the US as Studor vents and Sure-Vent) are negative-pressure-activated, one-way mechanical valves, used in a plumbing or drainage venting system to eliminate the need for conventional pipe venting and roof penetrations. A discharge of wastewater causes the AAV to open, releasing the vacuum and allowing air to enter the plumbing vent pipe for proper pressure equalization.

Since AAVs will only operate under negative pressure situations, they are not suitable for all venting applications, such as venting a sump, where positive pressures are created when the sump fills. Also, where positive drainage pressures are found in larger buildings or multi-story buildings, an air admittance valve could be used in conjunction with a positive pressure reduction device such as the PAPA positive air pressure attenuator to provide a complete venting solution for more complicated drainage venting systems.

Using AAVs can significantly reduce the amount of venting materials needed in a plumbing system, increase plumbing labor efficiency, allow greater flexibility in the layout of plumbing fixtures, and reduce long-term roof maintenance problems associated with conventional vent stack roofing penetrations.

While some state and local building departments prohibit AAVs, the International Residential and International Plumbing Codes allow it to be used in place of a vent through the roof. AAVs are certified to reliably open and close a minimum of 500,000 times, (approximately 30 years of use) with no release of sewer gas; some manufacturers claim their units are tested for up to 1.5 million cycles, or at least 80 years of use. AAVs have been effectively used in Europe for more than two decades.

- Check vents employ a check valve.

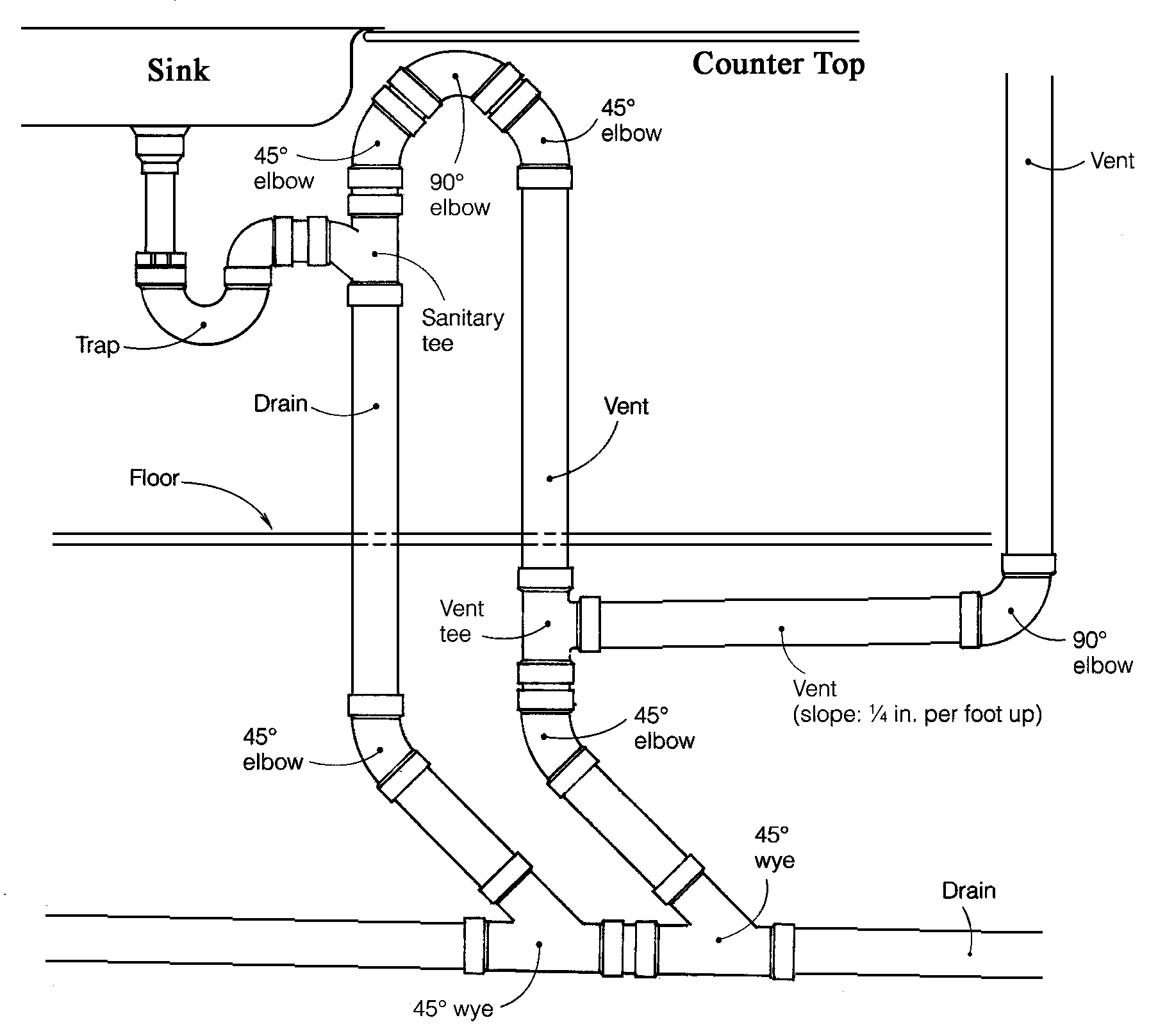
In-line vent for under-cabinet waste plumbing

- In-line vent (also known as an island fixture vent, and, colloquially, a "Chicago Loop", "Boston loop" or "Bow Vent") is an alternate method permissible in some jurisdictions of venting the trap installed on an under counter island sink or other similar applications where a conventional vertical vent stack or air admittance valve is not feasible or allowed.

As with all drains, ventilation must be provided to allow the flowing waste water to displace the sewer gas in the drain, and then to allow air (or some other fluid) to fill the vacuum which would otherwise form as the water flows down the pipe.

An island fixture vent allows water displaces the sewer gas up to the sanitary tee, the water flows downward while sewer gas is displaced upward and toward the vent. The vent can also provide air to fill any vacuum created.

The key to a functional island fixture vent is that the top elbow must be at least as high as the "flood level" (the peak possible drain water level in the sink), allowing it to serve as a de facto vacuum breaker preventing the loop from becoming a siphon for an overfilled sink, as from a clogged drain (rather than vent) line.

== Fittings ==
All DWV systems require various sized fittings and pipes which are measured by their internal diameter of both the pipes and the fittings which, and in most cases are Schedule 40 PVC wye's, tee's, elbows ranging from 90 degrees to 22.5 degrees for both inside diameter fitment (street) as well as outer diameter fitment (hub), repair and slip couplings, reducer couplings, and pipe which is typically ten feet in length. Sizes for hub fittings such as wye's and tee's are based on the inside diameter of the pipe that goes into their hubs. Items such as washer boxes and Studor vents are also measured by the internal diameter of the fittings.

Cost of materials, ease of installation, and resistance to corrosion all have come to favor Schedule 40 PVC DWV systems, which are replacing cast iron "hub" and "no-hub" DWV systems in many municipalities, while parts and skills associated with installing and maintaining cast iron systems are becoming increasingly scarce and costly.

The advent of PVC and solvent welding adhesives, which secure fittings against leakage and separation by melting the material into itself, has profoundly simplified and made installing a DWV system less expensive. As with pressurized water "supply" plumbing, all lines must be bored for where they will not compromise structural framing and properly supported inline, and all external penetrations properly sealed and flashed.

== See also ==
- Fuel gas piping
- Plumber
- Potable cold and hot water supply
- Rainwater, surface, and subsurface water drainage
