= Sink =

Bowl-shaped plumbing fixture

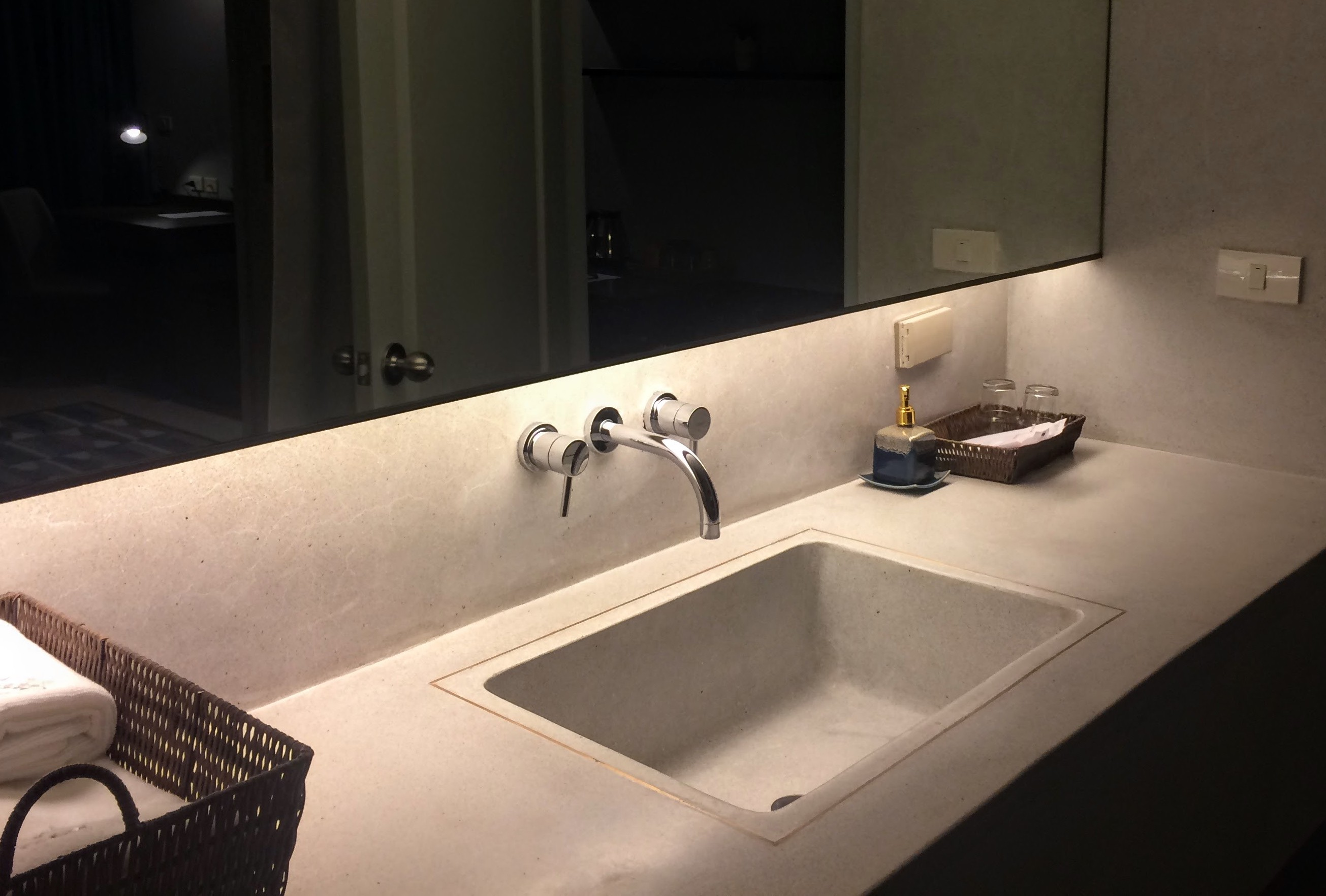
A sink/basin in a bathroom

A sink (also known as basin or washbin in the UK) is a bowl-shaped plumbing fixture for washing hands, dishwashing, and other purposes. Sinks have a tap (faucet) that supplies hot and cold water and may include a spray feature to be used for faster rinsing. They also include a drain to remove used water; this drain may itself include a strainer and/or shut-off device and an overflow-prevention device. Sinks may also have an integrated soap dispenser. Many sinks, especially in kitchens, are installed adjacent to or inside a counter.

== History ==
The washstand was a bathroom sink made in the United States in the late 18th century. The washstands were small tables on which were placed a pitcher and a deep bowl, following the English tradition. Sometimes the table had a hole where the large bowl rested, which led to the making of dry sinks. From about 1820 to 1900, the dry sink evolved by the addition of a wooden cabinet with a trough built on the top, lined with zinc or lead.

== Materials ==
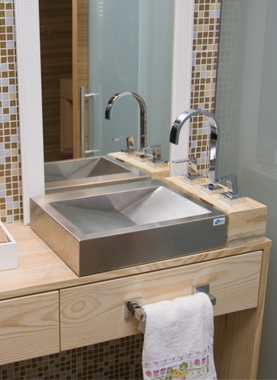
Bathroom stainless steel vessel sink standing on a wood surface

Stainless steel is most commonly used in kitchens and commercial applications because it represents a good trade-off between cost, usability, durability, and ease of cleaning. Most stainless steel sinks are made by drawing a sheet of stainless steel over a die. Some very deep sinks are fabricated by welding. Stainless steel sinks will not be damaged by hot or cold objects and resist damage from impacts. Stainless steel sinks are widely celebrated for their durability, sleek appearance, and resistance to rust and corrosion. One disadvantage of stainless steel is that, being made of thin metal, they tend to be noisier than most other sink materials, although some manufacturers may apply a coat of vibration-damping material to the underside of the sink.

Other materials used for sinks include soapstone, fire clay, granite, cast iron, quartz, porcelain, and copper.

== Styles ==
=== Butler's sink ===
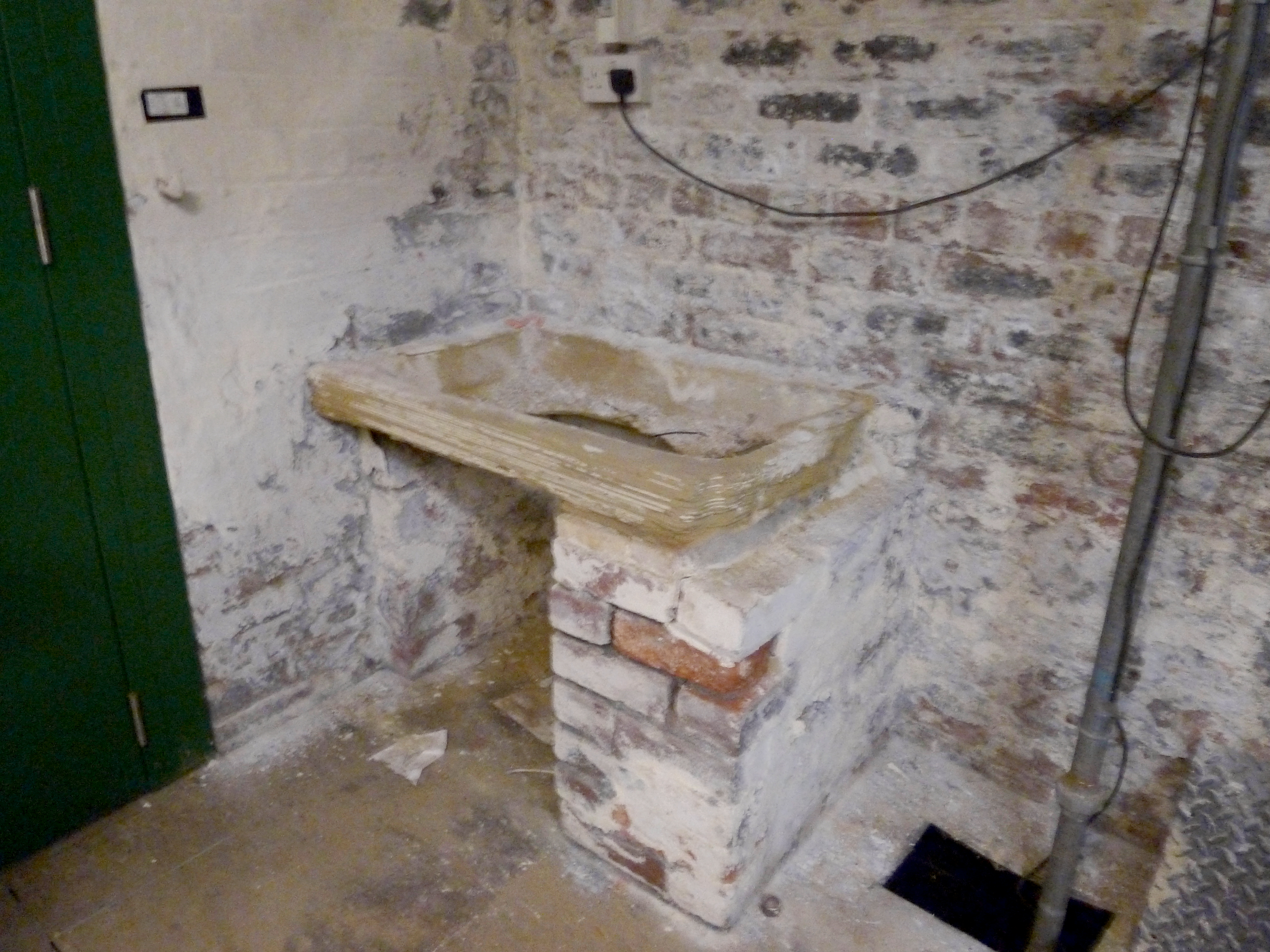
A Victorian Belfast sink at Spring Hall, Halifax, England

A butler's sink is a rectangular ceramic sink with a rounded rim which is set into a work surface. There are generally two kinds of butler's sinks: the London sink and the Belfast sink. In 2006, both types of sinks usually were 62 centimetres (24 in) across and 46 centimetres (18 in) front-to-back, with a depth of 22.5 centimetres (8.9 in). London sinks were originally shallower than Belfast sinks. One plumbing guide in 1921 suggested that the Belfast sink was 38 centimetres (15 in) deep. The primary difference both in the past and today between a Belfast and London sink is that the Belfast sink is fitted with an overflow weir which prevented water from spilling over the sink's edge by draining it away and down into the wastewater plumbing.

=== Vessel sink ===
A vessel sink is a free-standing sink, generally finished and decorated on all sides, that sits directly on the surface of the furniture on which it is mounted. These sinks have become increasingly popular with bathroom designers because of the large range of materials, styles, and finishes that can be used.

== See also ==
- Dipper well
- Domestic water system
- Floor plan
- Garbage disposal
- Lavabo
- Proverbial kitchen sink
- Trap (plumbing)

== Bibliography ==
- Blower, G. J. (2006). Plumbing: mechanical services (5th ed.). Harlow: Prentice Hall. ISBN 0131976214.
- Fletcher, Banister Flight, Sir. Architectural Hygiene. London: Sir I. Pitman & Sons, 1921.
