= Shower =

Place in which a person bathes under a spray of water

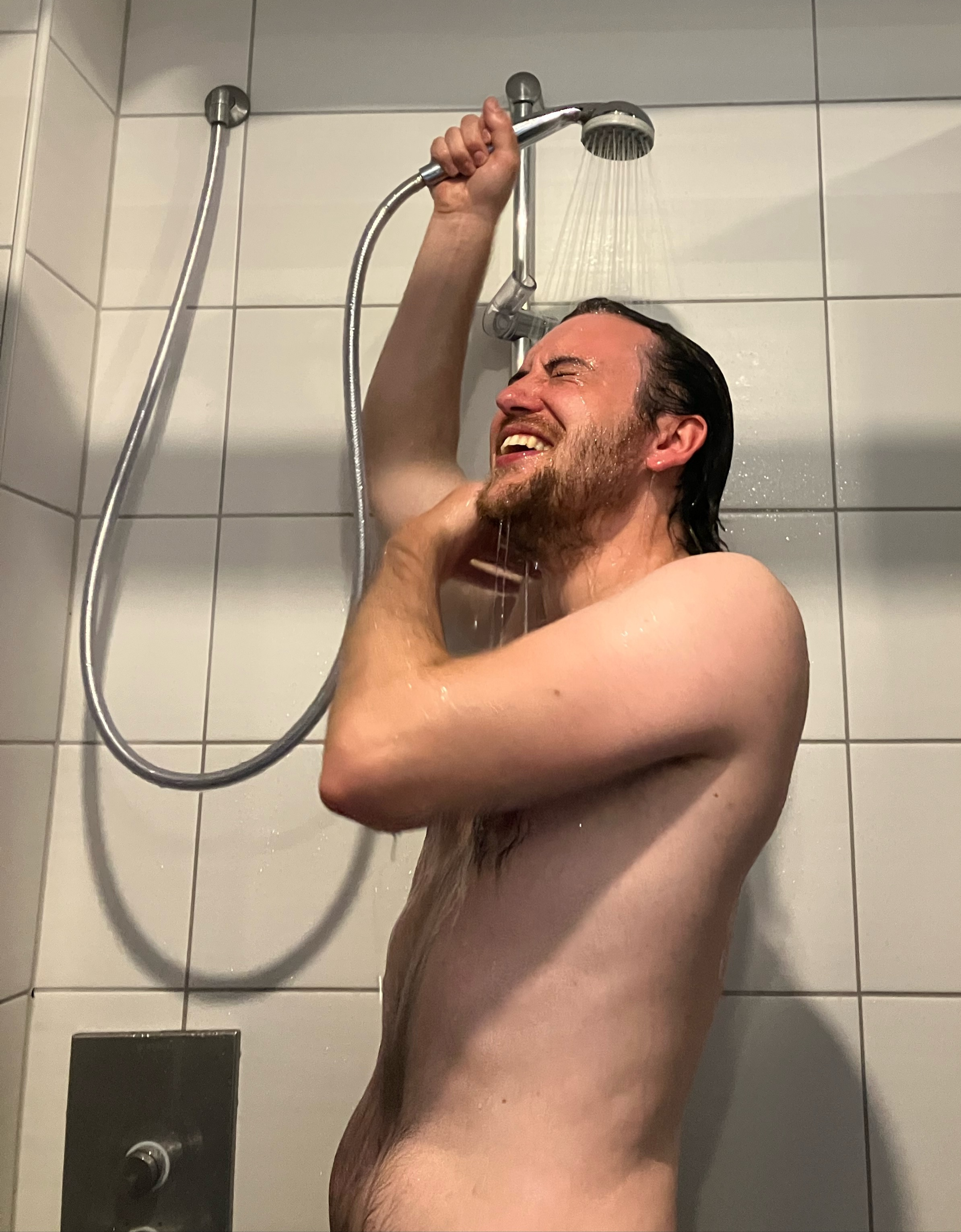
A man taking a shower

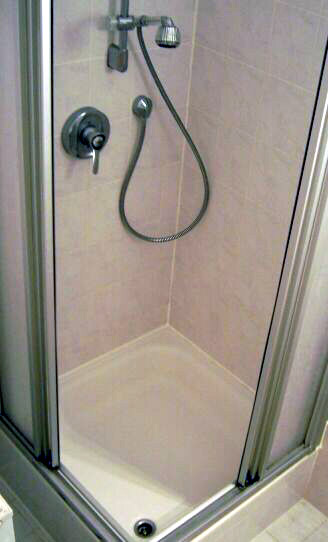
A typical stall shower with height-adjustable nozzle and folding doors

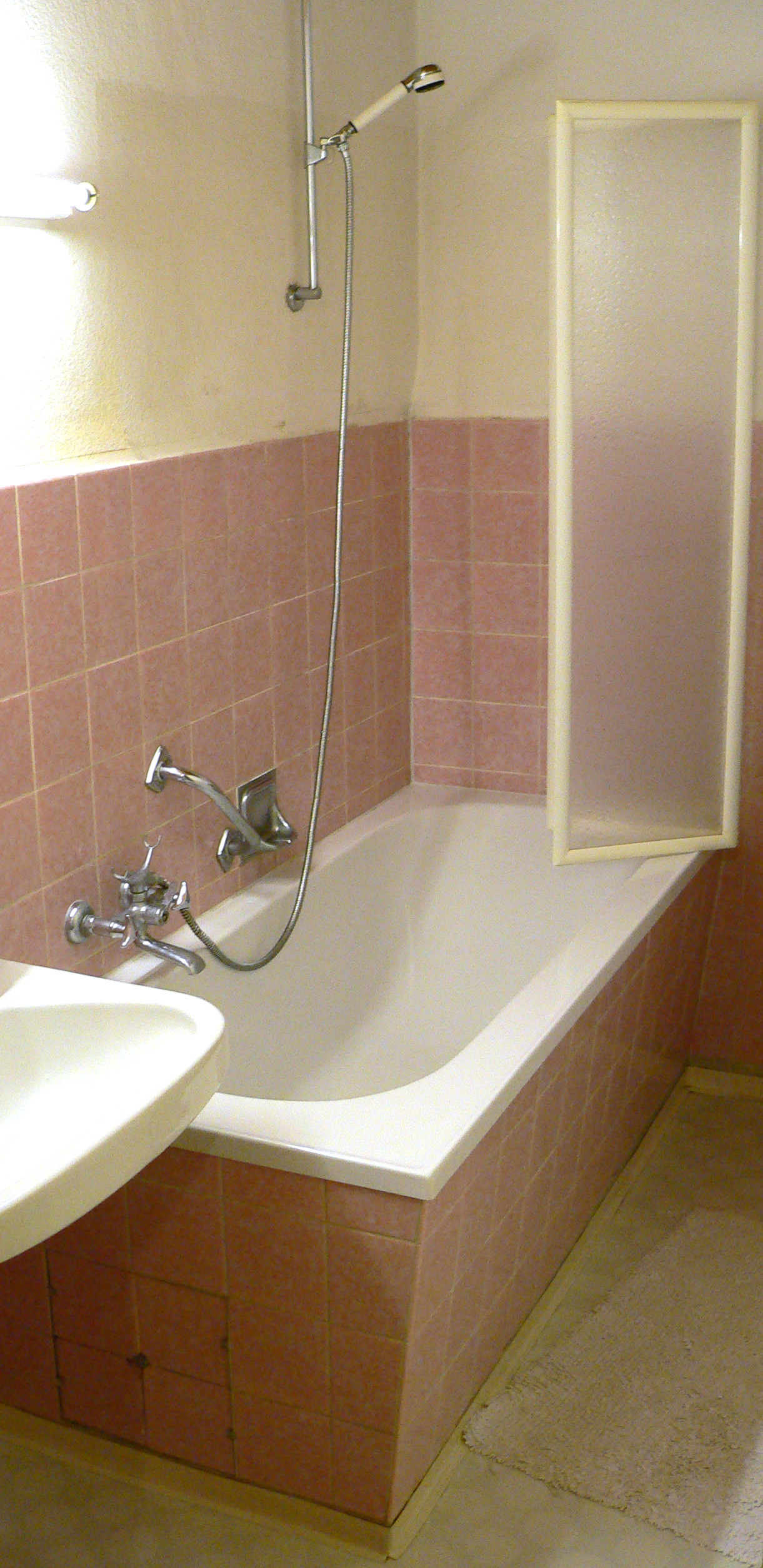
A combination shower and bathtub, with movable screen

A shower is a place in which a person bathes under a spray of typically warm or hot water. Indoors, there is a drain in the floor. Most showers are set up to have adjustable temperature, spray pressure, and showerhead nozzle angle. The simplest showers have a swivelling nozzle aimed downward, while more complex showers have a showerhead connected to a hose that has a mounting bracket; this allows the showerer to hold the showerhead by hand to spray the water onto different parts of their body. A showerhead can be installed in a small shower stall or bathtub, with a plastic shower curtain or door.

Showering is common due to the efficiency of using it compared with using a bathtub. Its use in hygiene is, therefore, common practice.

== History ==
Waterfalls have historically been used as primitive forms of showers. The falling water rinsed the bathers completely clean. It was more efficient than bathing in a traditional basin, which required manual transport of both fresh and waste water. Ancient people began to reproduce these natural phenomena by pouring jugs of water, often very cold, over themselves after washing. There has been evidence of early upper-class Egyptian and Mesopotamians having indoor shower rooms where servants would bathe them in the privacy of their own homes. However, these were primitive by modern standards, having rudimentary drainage systems, and water was carried, not pumped, into the room.

Ancient Greeks had showers. Their aqueducts and water systems made of lead pipes allowed water to be pumped both into and out of large communal shower rooms used by elites and common citizens alike. These rooms have been discovered at the site of the city Pergamum and can also be found represented in pottery of the era. The depictions are very similar to modern locker room showers and even include bars to hang up clothing.

The ancient Romans also followed this convention; their famous bathhouses (Thermae) can be found all around the Mediterranean and as far out as modern-day England. The Romans not only had these showers but also believed in bathing several times a week, if not every day. The water and sewage systems developed by the Greeks and Romans broke down and fell out of use after the fall of the Roman Empire.

=== Modern showers ===
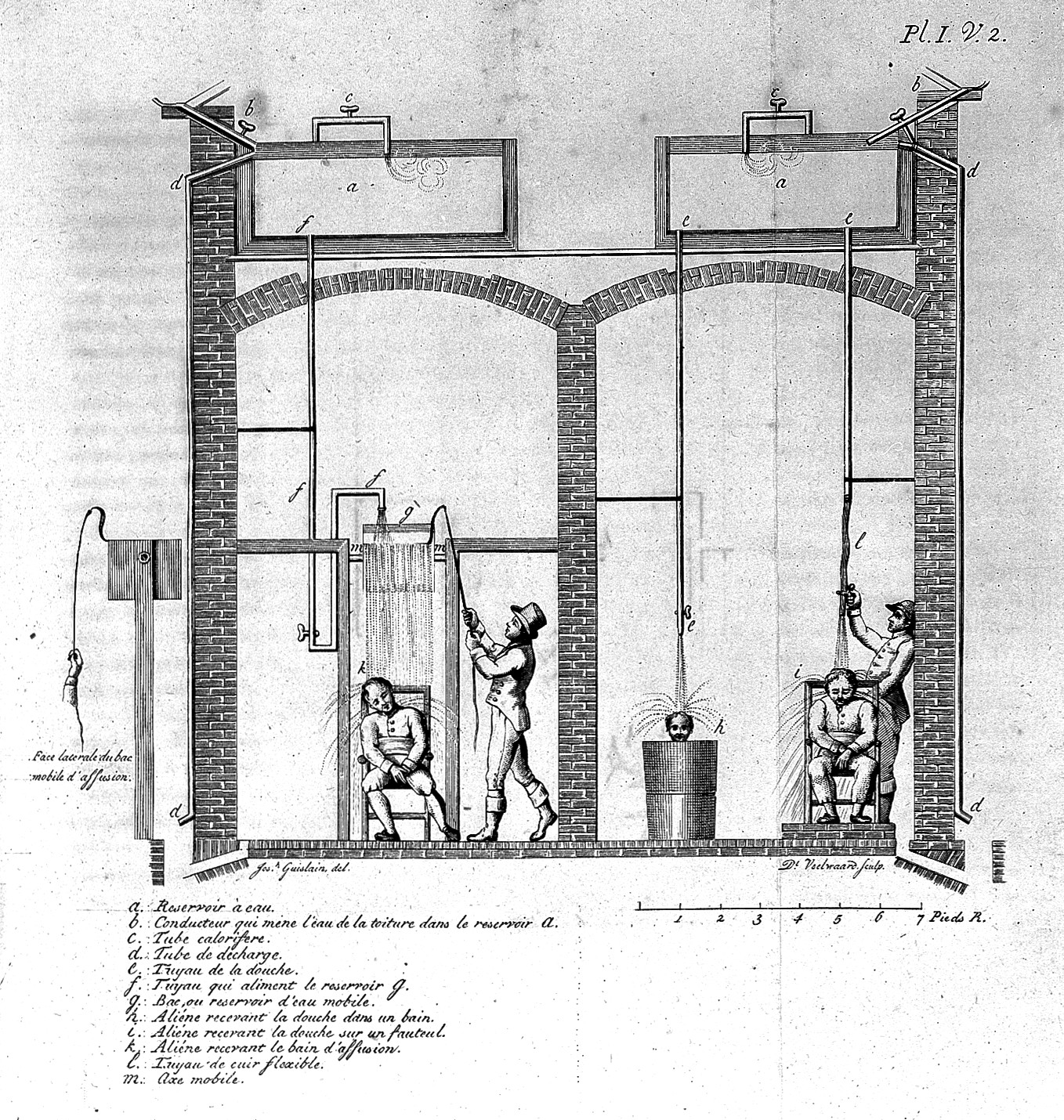
Illustration of showers from Traité sur l'aliénation mentale et sur les hospices des aliénés (Treatise on insanity and on the hospices of the insane) by Joseph Guislain (1826). At the time, it was thought cold water showers could alleviate mental illness

The first known mechanical shower, operated by a hand pump, was patented in England in 1767 by William Feetham, a stove maker from Ludgate Hill in London. His shower contraption used the pump to force the water into a vessel above the user's head, and a chain would then be pulled to release the water from the vessel. Although the system dispensed with the servant labour of filling up and pouring out buckets of water, the showers failed to catch on with the rich, as a method for piping hot water through the system was not available. The system would also recycle the same dirty water through every cycle.

This early start was significantly improved in the anonymously invented English Regency shower design of c. 1810 (there is some ambiguity among the sources). The original design was over 10 ft (3.0 m) tall, and was made of several metal pipes painted to look like bamboo. A basin suspended above the pipes fed water into a nozzle that distributed the water over the user's shoulders. The water on the ground was drained and pumped back through the pipes into the basin, where the cycle would repeat itself. The prototype was steadily improved upon in the following decades until it began to approximate the shower of today in its mode of operation. Hand-pumped models became fashionable at one point, as well as the use of adjustable sprayers for different water flows. The reinvention of reliable indoor plumbing around 1850 allowed free-standing showers to be connected to a running water source, supplying a renewable flow of water. The shower cabin was invented in 1839 by Polish-Canadian politician and engineer Aleksander Edward Kierzkowski.

Modern showers were installed in the barracks of the French army in the 1870s as an economic hygiene measure, under the guidance of François Merry Delabost, a French doctor and inventor. As surgeon-general at Bonne Nouvelle prison in Rouen, Delabost had previously replaced individual baths with mandatory communal showers for use by prisoners, arguing that they were more economical and hygienic. First six, then eight shower stalls were installed. A steam engine heated the water, and in less than five minutes, up to eight prisoners could wash simultaneously with only twenty litres of water. The French system of communal showers was adopted by other armies, the first being that of Prussia in 1879, and by prisons in other jurisdictions. They were also adopted by boarding schools before being installed in public bathhouses. The first shower in a public bathhouse was in 1887 in Vienna. In France, public bathhouses and showers were established by Charles Cazalet, firstly in Bordeaux in 1893 and then in Paris in 1899.

Historically, showering was relatively rare; most people regularly cleaned themselves by bathing (that is, immersion in a tub, pool, or body of water) rather than showering (by standing upright under a continuous spray of water). Due to the expense of shower technology, showers in private homes for individual use did not become popular and commonplace until the 1970s.

== Types ==
=== Domestic ===
Domestic showers are most commonly stall showers or showers combined with a bathtub. A stall shower is a dedicated shower area that uses a door or curtain to contain water spray. The shower/tub format saves bathroom space and enables the area to be used for either a bath or a shower, and commonly uses a sliding shower curtain or door to contain the water spray. Showers may also be in a wet room, in which there is no contained shower area, or in a dedicated shower room, which does not require containment of water spray. Domestic showers can have a single shower head, multiple shower heads, handheld shower head(s), or other variations, all of which may be adjustable as needed to varying degrees.

=== Public ===
Public shower room

Many modern athletic and aquatic facilities provide showers for use by patrons, commonly in gender segregated changing rooms. These can be in the form of individual stalls shielded by curtains or a door, or communal shower rooms. The latter are generally large open rooms with any number of shower heads installed either directly into the walls or on posts throughout the shower area. Open showers are often provided at public swimming pools that require a pre-rinse and at popular beaches. Military forces around the world set up field showers to enable the washing away of dangerous residue from modern weapons such as caustic chemicals, deadly biological agents, and radioactive materials, which can harm forces on both sides of a conflict.

=== Wet room ===
A wet room often refers to a bathroom without internal dedicated or raised areas, which has an open shower. Structurally, a wet room requires the bathroom to have a gradient or slope towards a drain hole, and a foul air trap connecting the floor to the waste pipes. Depending on the region, the term wet room can also encompass other rooms such as laundry rooms. In Norway, for example, any room with tap water and a drain in the floor is considered a wet room. Different jurisdictions often have special regulations concerning the design and construction of wet rooms to prevent damage from damp air or water leakage, e.g. mold.

There are also often special regulations concerning electrical installations in wet rooms. For example, since water supplies usually have their own electrical grounding, there can be an added risk of injury associated with ground faults, and some jurisdictions therefore require the installation of residual-current devices in wet rooms.

== Other ==
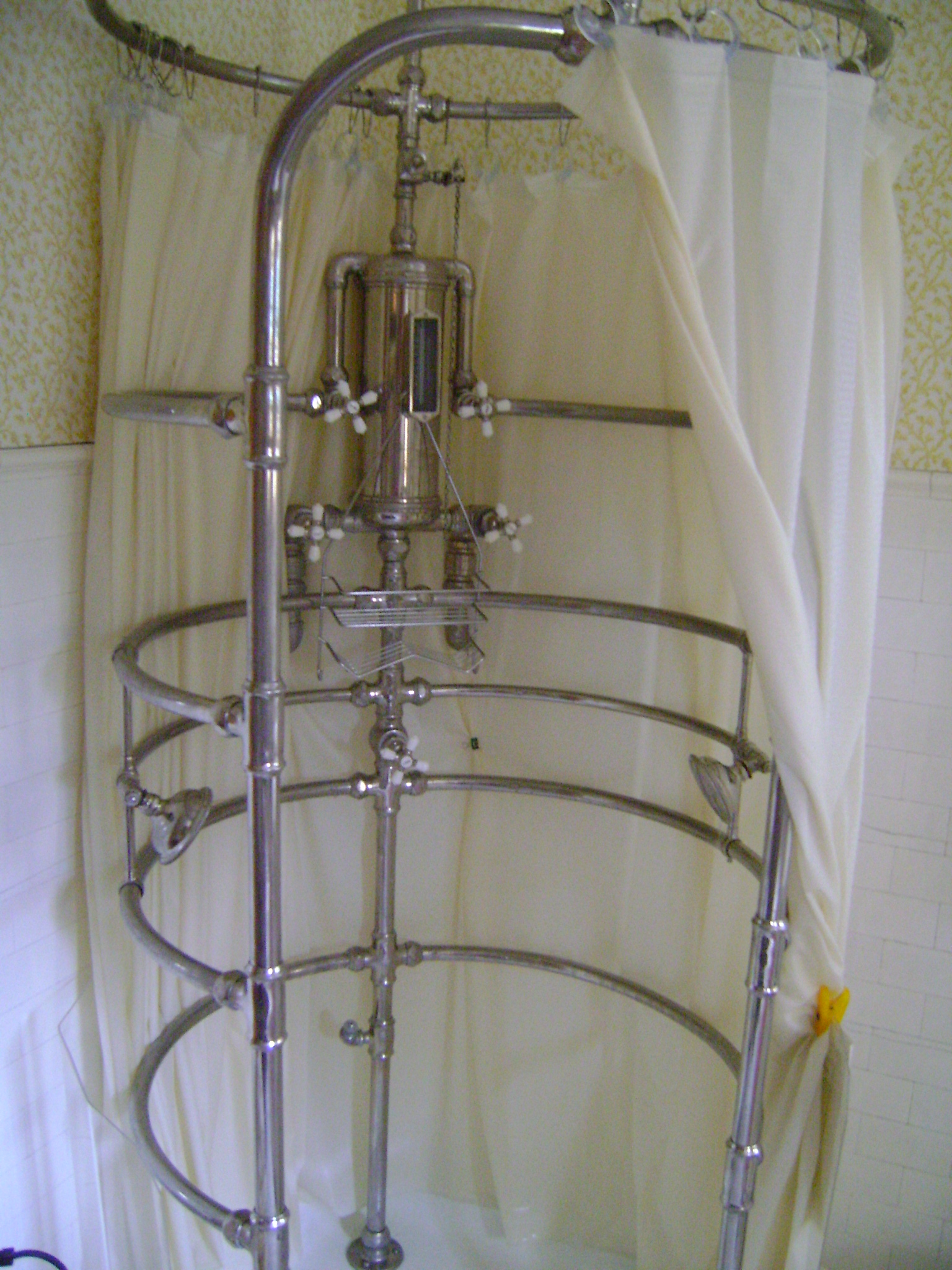
Rib shower

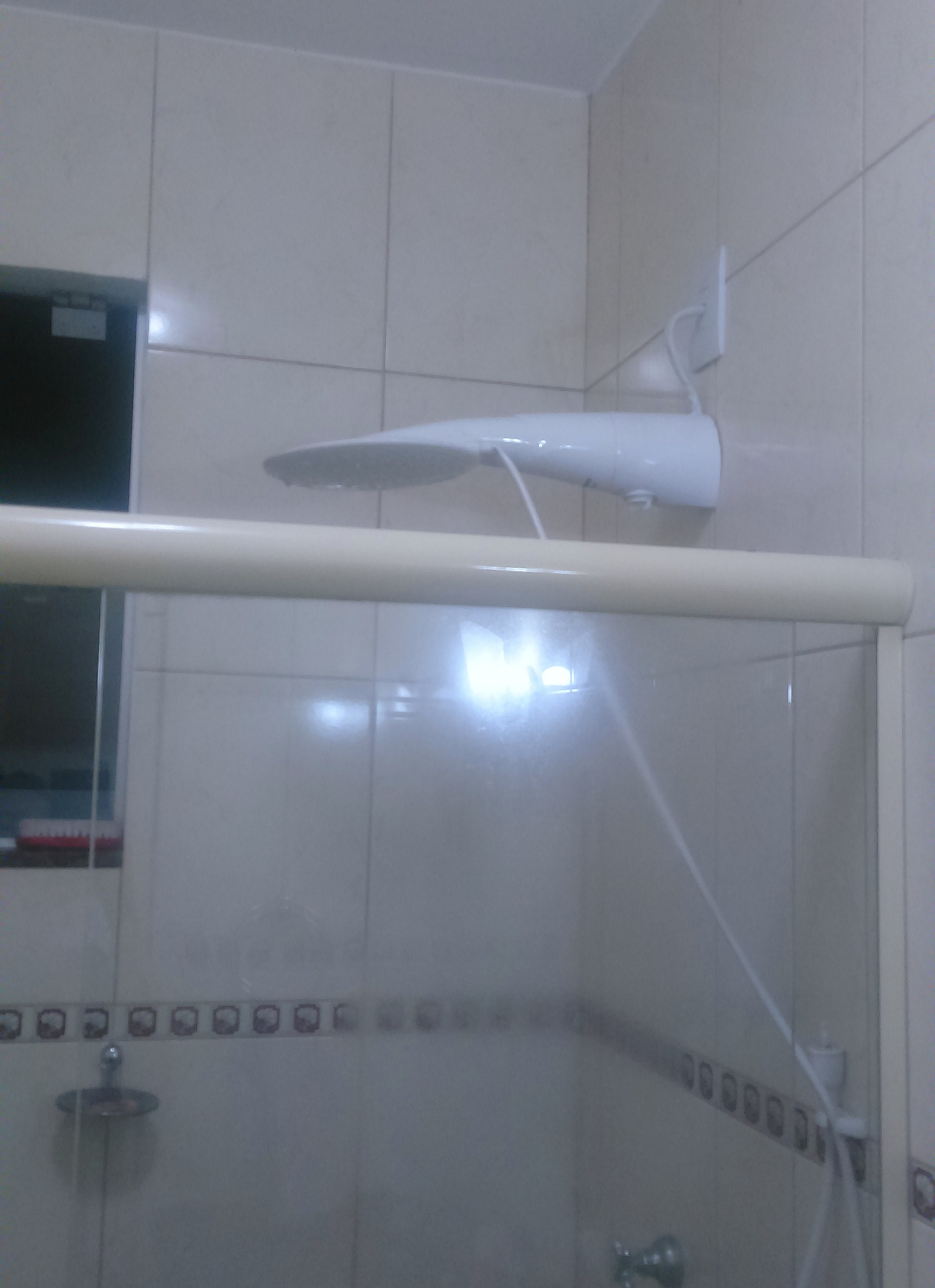
Brazilian electric shower

- Air shower, a type of bathing where high-pressure air is used to blow off excess dust particles from cleanroom personnel.
- Digital shower, a shower system that works in a similar way to mixer or power showers, but provides more control over the temperature of the water with the use of a digital control panel.
- Eco shower, a shower system that comes in mixer or electric variations, but also features a regulator to regulate the flow of water with a view to saving water.
- Electric shower, a shower stall device to locally heat shower water with electrical power.
- Emergency showers, installed in laboratories and other facilities that use hazardous chemicals, are required by law in the United States; designed to deluge continuously at around 30–60 US gallons (110–230 L) per minute for at least 15 minutes and should be located at most 10 seconds away from potential users.
- Mixer shower, a shower system that takes water from existing hot and cold water supplies and combines them within the unit.
- Navy shower, a method of showering that allows for significant conservation of water and energy.
- Power shower, a shower stall device that works similarly to a mixer shower by mixing existing hot and cold water feeds, but locally increases the water pressure available to the shower head by means of an electric booster pump.
- Roman shower, a shower that does not use a door or curtain, improving accessibility
- Steam shower, a type of bathing where a humidifying steam generator produces steam that is dispersed around a person's body.
- Vichy shower, a shower where large quantities of warm water are poured over a spa patron while the user lies within a shallow (wet) bed, similar to a massage table, but with drainage for the water.

== Types of shower heads ==
- Fixed shower heads: Traditional fixed shower-heads are mostly common shower-faucets because they can easily connect to the plumbing fixtures without any additional hardware.
- Shower handsets/bidet shower: Hand-set shower-faucets are connected by a flexible hose, and can also be mounted and used like a fixed shower-head.
- Ceiling-mounted faucets: Ceiling-mounted shower-faucets are typically rain-drop shower-heads mounted in the ceiling of the shower. Water rains down, at low or medium pressure, using gravity to shower on one from directly above.
- Adjustable shower heads: Adjustable shower faucets often have numerous settings, including pulsating massage and low/medium/high-pressure flow settings.
- Shower panels: Unlike a single showerhead, these are wall-mounted with sprayers aimed horizontally at various parts of the body.

== Use and ecology ==
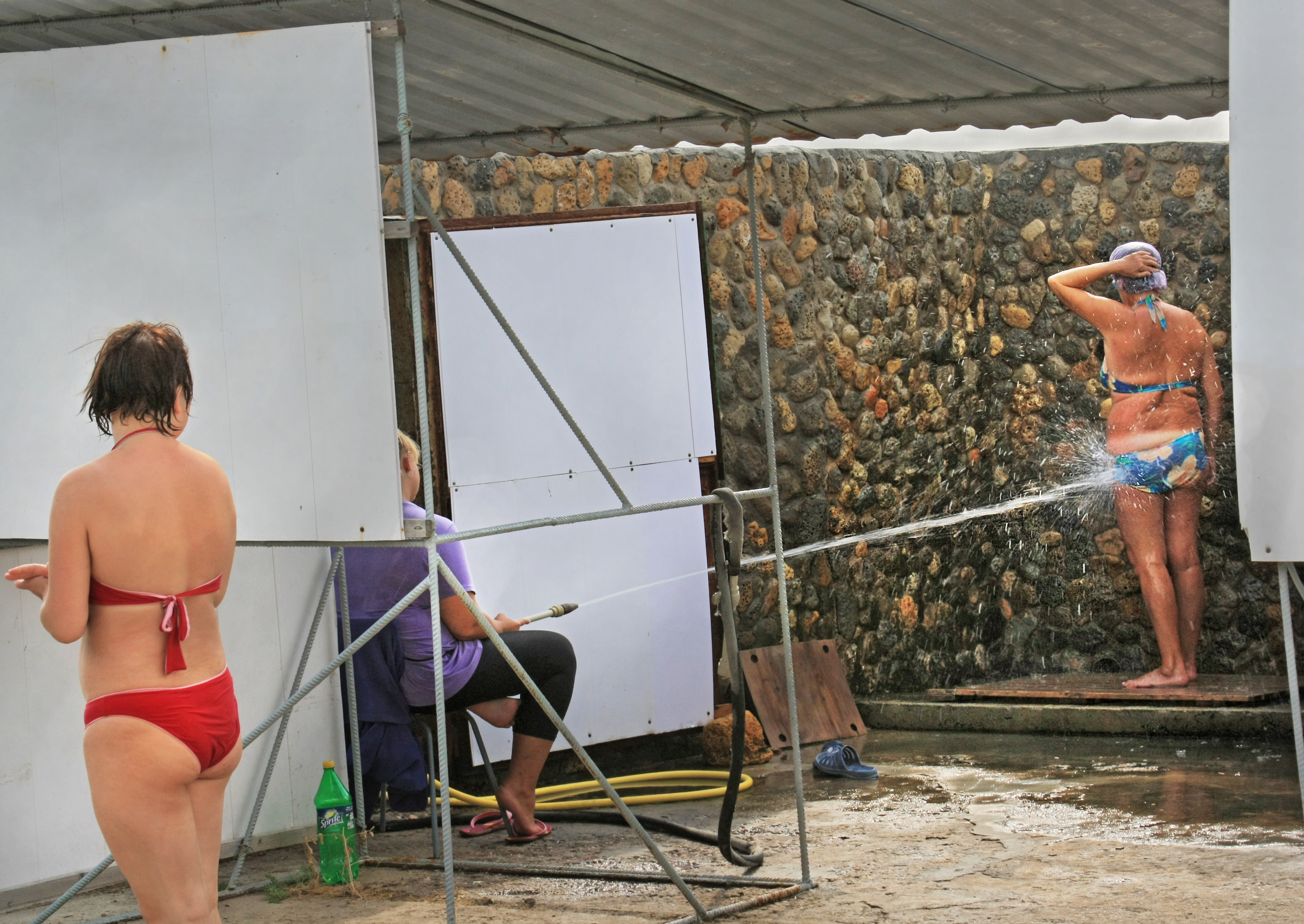
Hydro-massage on Lake Moynaki, Yevpatoria, Crimea

Shower usage in the latter half of the 20th century increased rapidly. Personal hygiene became a primary concern, and bathing every day or multiple times a day is common in Western cultures. Showering is generally faster than bathing and can use less water. In an average home, showers are typically the third largest water use after toilets and clothes washers. The average American shower uses 17.2 US gallons (65 L; 14.3 imp gal) and lasts for 8.2 minutes at an average flow rate of 2.1 US gallons (7.9 L; 1.7 imp gal) per minute.

Showering is one of the leading ways people use water in the home, accounting for nearly 17 percent of residential indoor water use, which roughly equals to 1,200,000,000 US gallons (4.5×10^{9} L; 1.00×10^{9} imp gal) of water annually just for showering. The US Environmental Protection Agency recommends retrofitting home showers with a shower head that uses less than 2 US gallons (7.6 L; 1.7 imp gal) to conserve water. However, many have hypothesized that reducing the flow rates of showerheads might cause users to take much longer showers. Other options to save water include using extra high pressure mist flow or design in sensors and valves to shut off or reduce water flow while people are not actively using the shower water.

Various measures can be taken to increase safety for those, especially older adults, taking showers or baths. Some people take more than one shower each day, normally at their normal shower time, and after exercising. People also shower to cool off in hot weather, especially those unaccustomed to the climate. Used shower water can be employed as greywater.

== Cultural significance ==
Showering is mostly part of a daily routine, primarily to promote cleanliness and prevent odor, disease, and infection. Advances in science and medicine in the 19th century began to realize the benefit of regular bathing to an individual's health. As a result, most modern cultures encourage a daily personal hygiene regimen. Showering has also developed the reputation as a relaxing and generally therapeutic activity.

== Structure and design ==
Designs for shower facilities vary by location and purpose. There are free-standing showers, but also showers that are integrated into a bathtub. Showers are separated from the surrounding area through watertight curtains (shower curtain), sliding doors, or folding doors, or shower blinds, to protect the space from spraying water. Showers with a level entry wet room are becoming very popular, mainly due to improvements in waterproofing systems and prefabricated components.

Places such as a swimming pool, a locker room, or a military facility have multiple showers. There may be communal shower rooms without divisions, or shower stalls (typically open at the top). Many types of showers are available, including complete shower units, which are all-encompassing showers that include the pan, walls, and often the shower head, as well as pieced-together units in which the pan, shower head, and doors are purchased separately. Each type of shower poses different installation issues.

=== Installation ===
Though the installation requirements of each shower will differ, the installation of a shower in general requires the laying of several water transportation pipes, including a pipe for hot water and for cold water, and a drainage pipe. The wet areas of a bathroom must be waterproof, and multiple layers of waterproofing can be employed. Grout is used to fill gaps between tiles, but grout and tile setting materials are generally porous. Tiles are typically waterproof, though a shower pan must be installed beneath them as a safety precaution to prevent water leakage. Thus, small mosaic tiles offer less of a defense than large format tiles. Sub-tile waterproofing is important when tiles are being used. Best practice requires a waterproofing material to cover the walls and floor of the shower area, that are then covered with tile, or in some countries with a sheet material like vinyl.

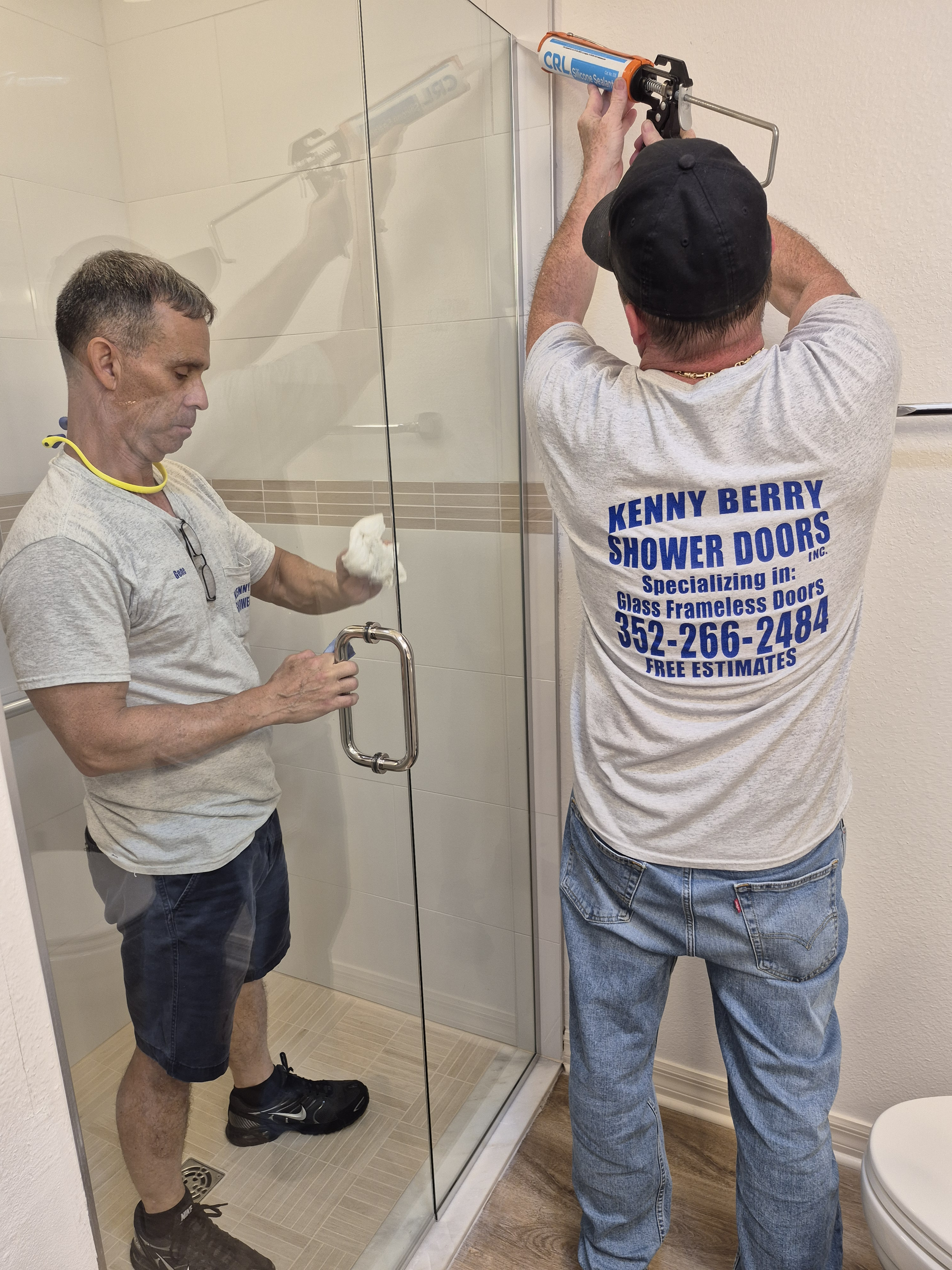
Worker installing a glass door

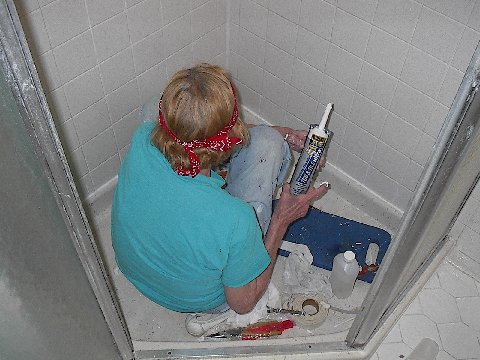
Repairing damaged tile in a shower stall with a caulking gun

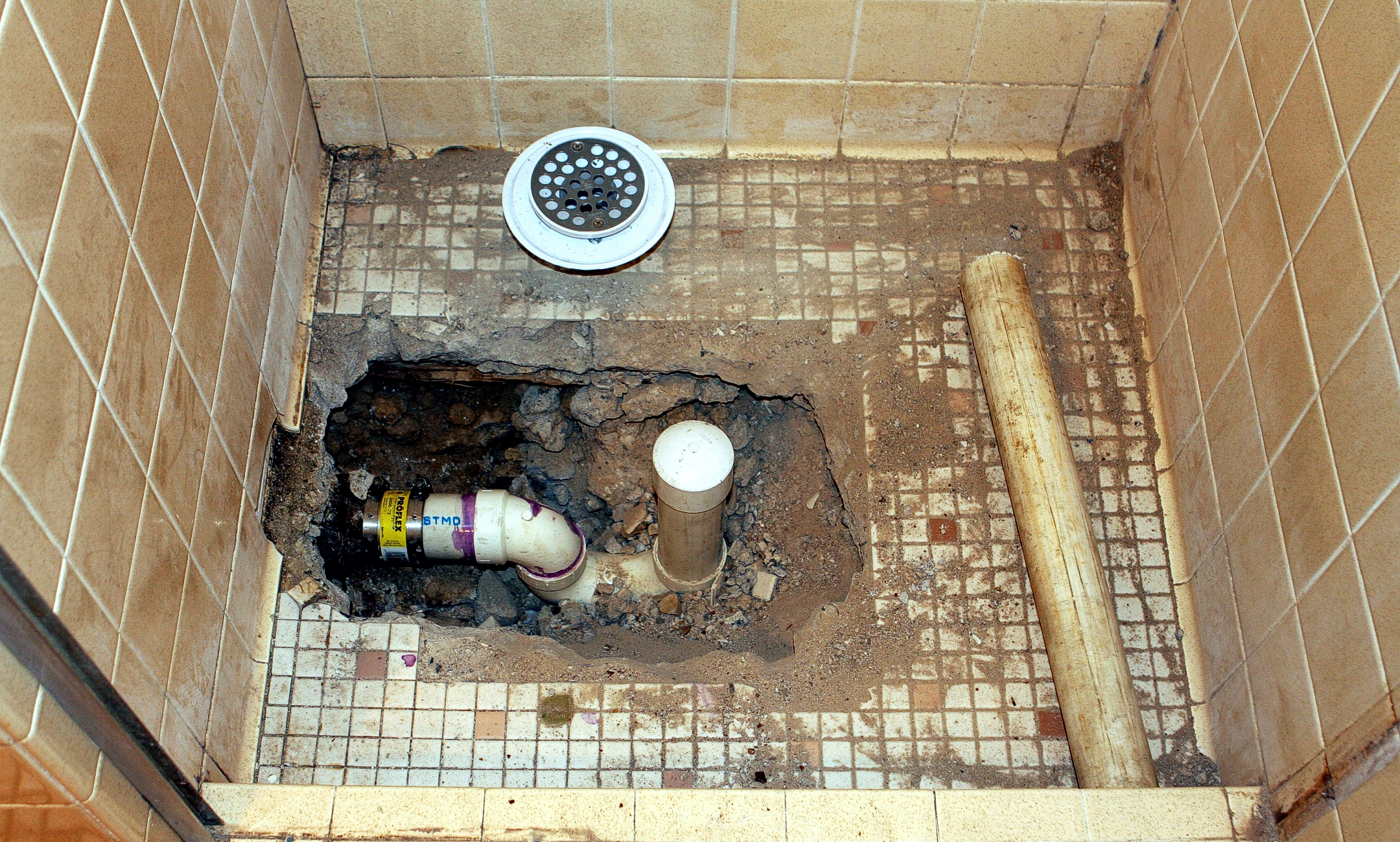
Shower repair showing drain piping with trap

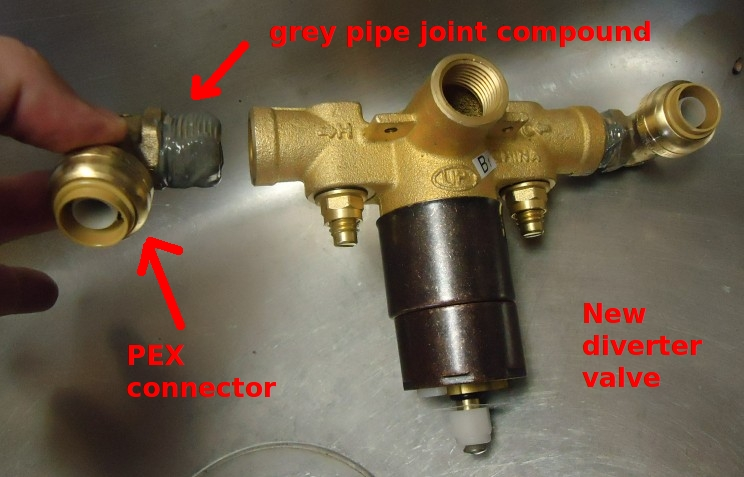
Diverter valve about to be installed behind a shower

=== Drainage ===
A shower may be equipped with a second emergency drain outside of the shower in case of overflow. An emergency overflow drain is required in Australia and some European countries.

=== Shower head ===
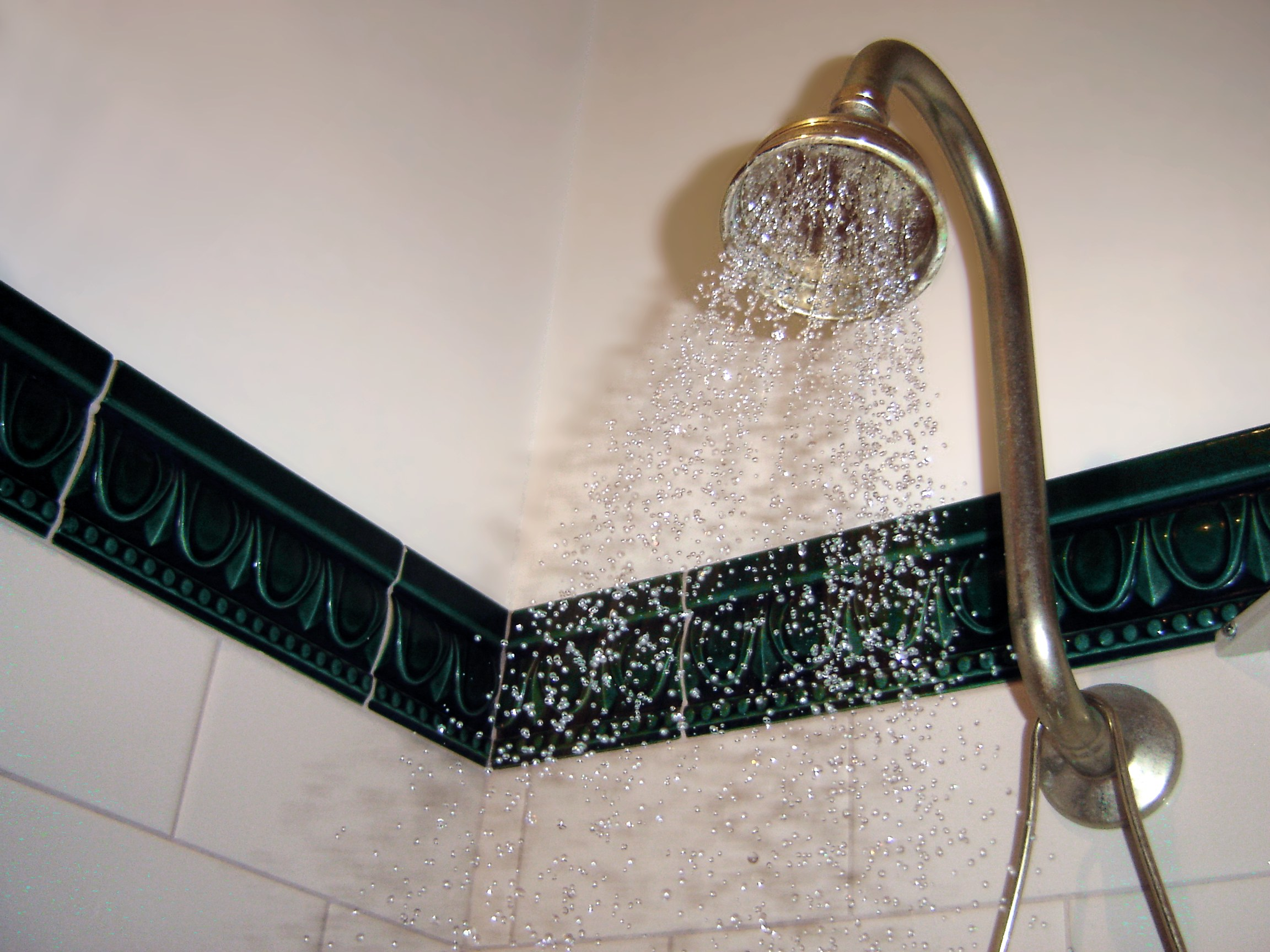
A shower head

A shower head is a perforated nozzle that distributes water over solid angle a focal point of use, generally overhead the bather. A shower uses less water than a complete immersion in a bath. Some shower heads can be adjusted to spray different patterns of water, such as massage, gentle spray, strong spray, and intermittent pulse or combination modes.

Hard water may result in calcium and magnesium deposits clogging the head, reducing the flow, and changing the spray pattern. For descaling, various acidic chemicals or brushes can be used, or some heads have rubber-like jets that can be manually descaled. A homemade remedy is to immerse it in a solution of water and vinegar for a while, since the vinegar can dissolve limescale.

Some governments around the world set standards for water usage and regulate shower heads. For example, in the United States, residential and most commercial shower heads must flow no more than 9.5 litres (2.1 imp gal; 2.5 US gal) per minute per the Department of Energy ruling 10 CFR 430. Low-flow shower heads that have a water flow of equal or less than 7.6 litres (1.7 imp gal; 2.0 US gal) per minute (2.0 gallons per minute), can use water more efficiently by aerating the water stream, altering nozzles through advanced flow principles, or by high-speed oscillation of the spray stream. The US EPA administers a voluntary water saving program, WaterSense, which can certify low-flow shower heads.

=== Shower and bathtub curtains ===
Curtains can be used in shower or bathtub enclosures with two primary purposes: to provide privacy and to prevent water from flooding or spraying outside the shower or bathtub area. Shower and bathtub curtains usually surround the bath inside the tub or shower area and are held up with railings or curtain rods high on the wall or ceiling. To accommodate the different types of bathtub shapes, railings can come in various sizes and are flexible in their design. The curtains are usually made from vinyl, cloth, or plastic (such as PEVA).

Shower curtains are often used in pairs: an inner liner positioned inside the bathtub or shower enclosure, and an outer decorative curtain. The inner liner serves a primarily functional role by preventing water from escaping the bathing area; it may also have decorative features. The outer curtain is placed outside the tub and is primarily ornamental, contributing to the bathroom's appearance and providing a secondary barrier to water and steam. The bottom portion of the inner curtain often comes with magnetic discs or suction cups, which adhere to the bathtub itself.

=== Shower and bathtub doors ===
Shower or bathtub doors are doors (also called screens) used in bathrooms that help keep water inside a shower or bathtub and are alternatives to shower curtains. They are available in many different styles, such as framed or frameless, sliding or swing. They are usually constructed of aluminium, clear glass, plexiglass, or tempered glass. Shower doors can come in many different hardware finishes and glass patterns that can match other bathroom hardware, such as faucets and shower heads. There are also shower doors that are in a neo-angle design for use on shower pans that have the neo design as well. The design of the shower pan is essential, as the shower door must be the type required for the pan to work. A shower door requires plastic lining along the edges of the door to protect against water leaking.

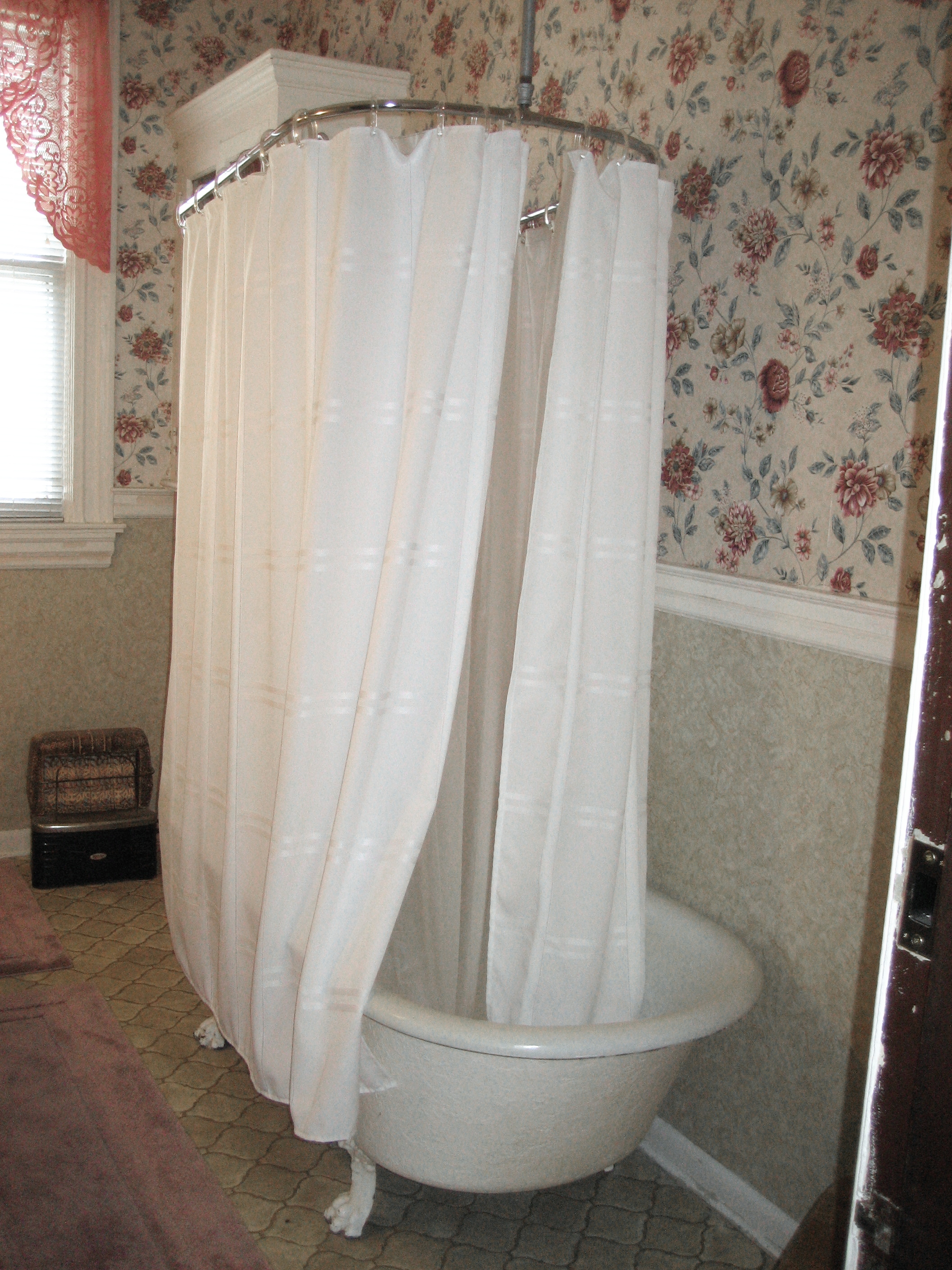
Bathtub curtain

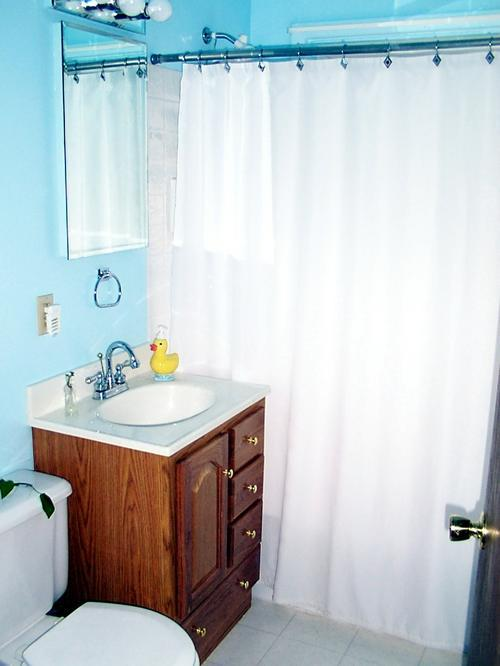
Shower curtain

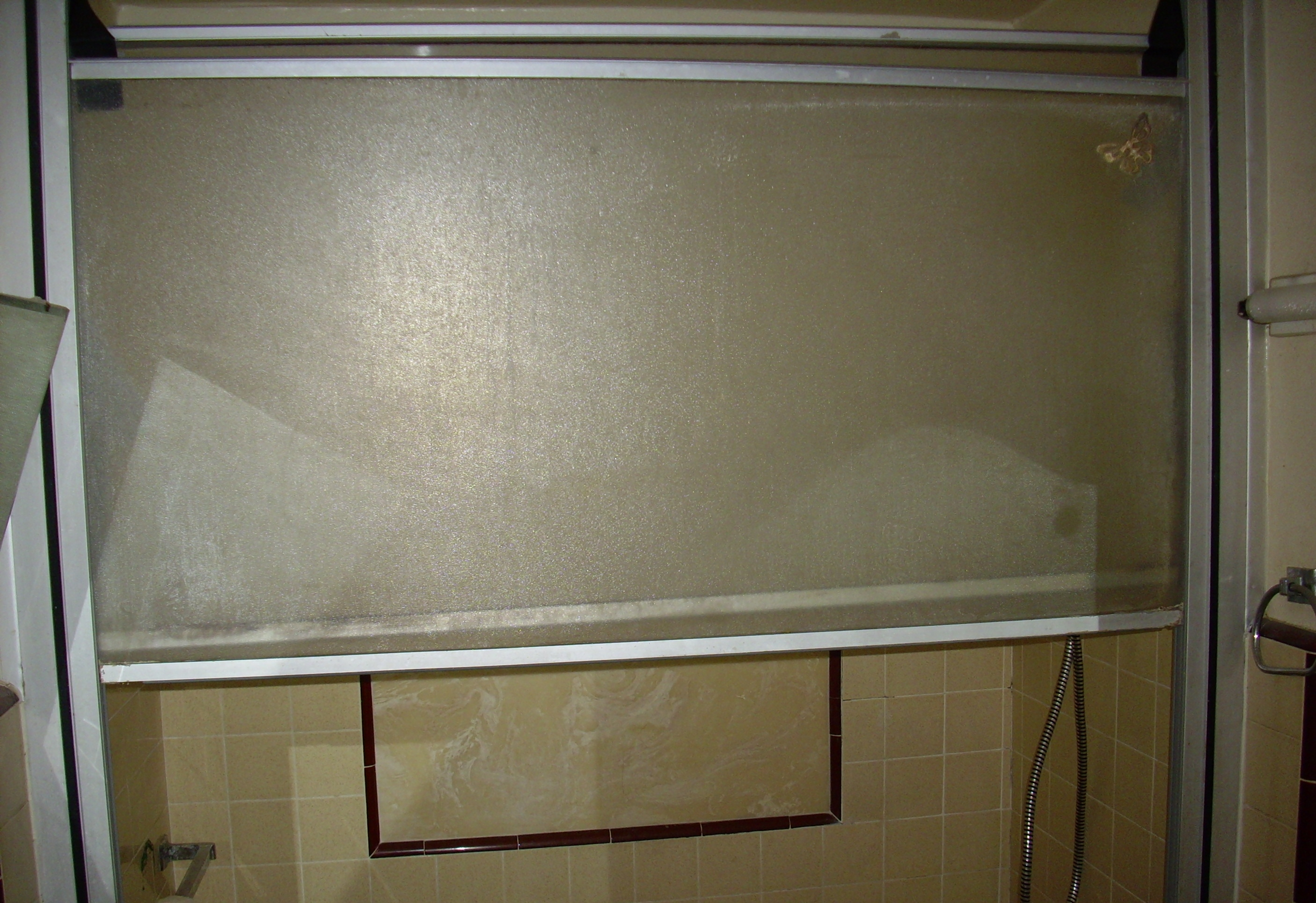
Raisable shower door

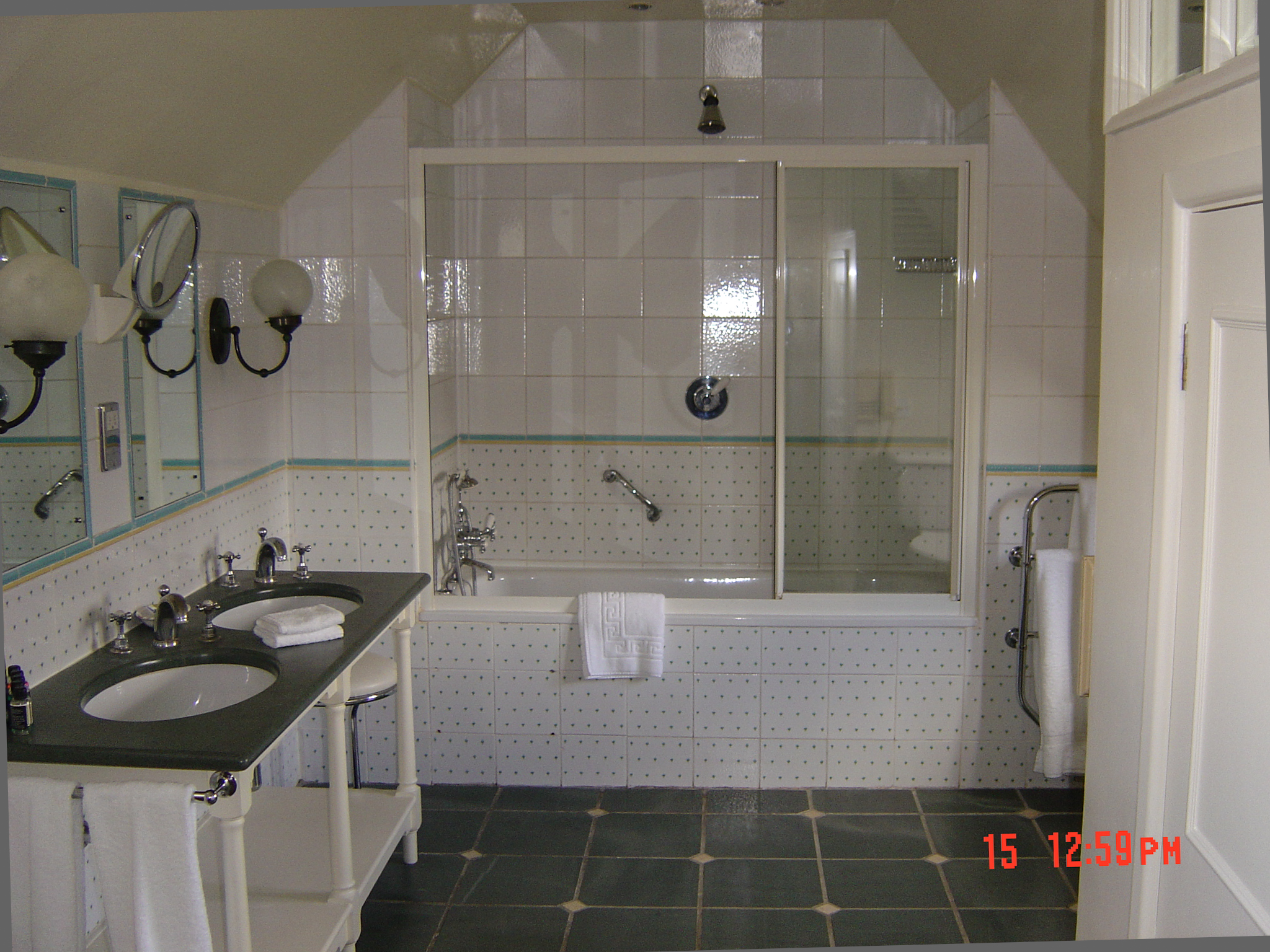
Bathtub door

== Equipment ==
- Pressure-balanced valve, a device to provide constant shower water pressure and prevent temperature fluctuations
- Shampoo
- Shower caddy, a storage system inside the shower, typically for shampoo, conditioner, soap, and other related things
- Shower cap, a cap worn while showering or bathing, to protect hair from becoming wet
- Shower radio, a radio that is waterproofed to allow it to be used in a bathroom or other wet environment
- Shower speaker, a Bluetooth speaker designed to play music while the shower is running
- Soap
- Washing mitt, a tool for applying soap to the body
- Water heat recycling units to reclaim much of the wastewater's heat and recycle it to the shower head and minimize heat lost to the drain

== See also ==
- Bathing
- Bathroom
- Bathtub
- Douche
- Navy shower
- Solar heated shower
- Steam shower
- Transfer bench
- Water recycling shower

== Cited works and general references ==
Books

- Brauer, Roger L B (2006). "Personal protective equipment". Safety and health for engineers (2nd ed.). John Wiley and Sons. ISBN 978-0-471-29189-3.
- Humphrey, John W; Olsen, John P; Sherwood, Andrew N (1998). Greek and Roman Technology: A Sourcebook. New York: Routledge. ISBN 978-0-415-06136-0.
- James, Peter; Thorpe, Nick (1995). Ancient Inventions. New York: Ballantine. ISBN 978-0-345-40102-1.
- Mayer, Leonard (1995). "Emergency systems". Design and planning of research and clinical laboratory facilities. John Wiley and Sons. ISBN 978-0-471-30623-8.
- "Shower". Oxford New Desk Dictionary and Thesaurus (3rd ed.). New York: Berkley Publishing Group. 2009. ISBN 978-0-425-22862-3. OCLC 276819901.
- Shove, Elizabeth (2004). Comfort, Cleanliness and Convenience The Social Organization of Normality (New Technologies/New Cultures). New York: Berg. ISBN 978-1-85973-630-2.
- Vincoli, Jeffrey W (2000). Lewis' dictionary of occupational and environmental safety and health. CRC Press. ISBN 978-1-56670-399-4.

Web pages

- Jones, Jerry (29 October 2004). "Decontamination shower system revamped". Reporter. Nashville, TN: Vanderbilt University Medical Center.
- Mullick, Abir (2005). "Bathing for Older people with Disabilities". UB School of Architecture and Planning. Archived from the original on 27 January 2013.
