= WISA (disambiguation) =

WISA may refer to:

- WISA (1390 AM) is a radio station broadcasting a Spanish News/Talk format.
- WISA web solution stack, which consists of Windows Server, Internet Information Services, Microsoft SQL Server and ASP.NET
- Welsh Ice Skating Association
- West Indies Associated States
- Western India States Agency
- WiSA, Wireless Speaker and Audio Association
- What If Scenario Analysis - in Project Management
