= Communal shower =

Group showers

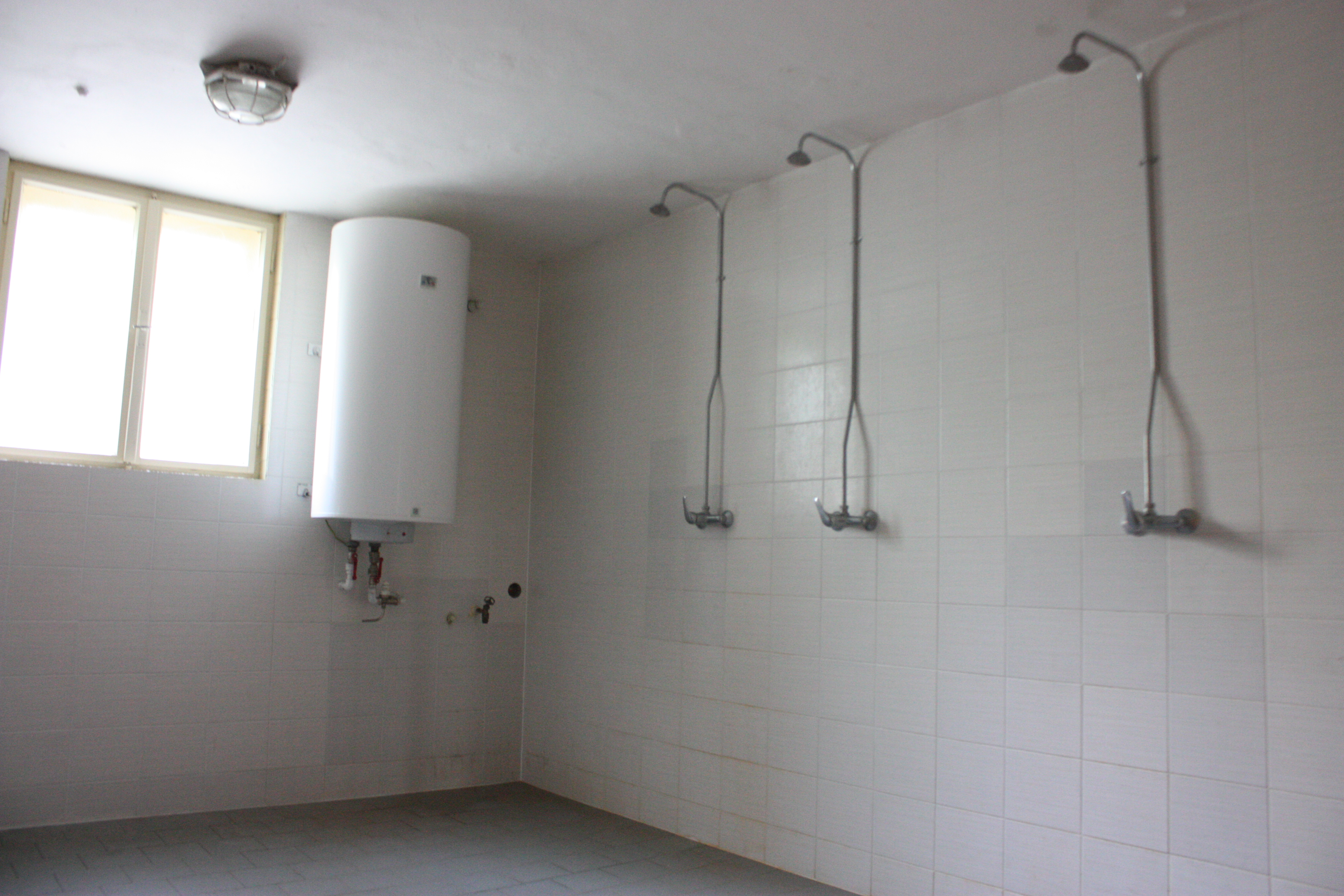
Communal shower in a school, Czech Republic, 2009

Communal showers (also called gang showers) are a group of single showers put together in one room or area. They are often used in changerooms, schools, prisons, and barracks for personal hygiene. Although the use of communal showers has grown less prevalent in the West in the 21st century than it was in prior years, communal showers are often present in school locker rooms for use after physical education. They also continue to exist in some gymnasiums and at many swimming pools.

== History ==
Modern communal showers were installed in the barracks of the French Army in the 1870s as an economic hygiene measure under the guidance of François Merry Delabost, a French doctor and inventor. As surgeon-general at Bonne Nouvelle prison in Rouen, Delabost had previously replaced individual baths with mandatory communal showers for use by prisoners, arguing that they were more economical and hygienic.

The French system of communal showers was adopted by other armies (the first being that of Prussia in 1879) and by prisons in other jurisdictions. They were also adopted by boarding schools before being installed in public bathhouses. The first shower in a public bathhouse was opened in 1887 in Vienna, Austria. In France, public bathhouses and showers were established by Charles Cazalet, first in Bordeaux in 1893 and then in Paris in 1899. They quickly proved successful, with the latter only closing in 1985.

== Modern usage ==
In the United States and in some English-speaking provinces of Canada, students at public schools have historically been required to shower communally with classmates of the same sex after physical education classes. In the US, public objections and the threat of lawsuits have led a number of school districts to make showers optional or to abolish the practice entirely.

In many parts of the Western world, the number of schools with open communal showers has gradually decreased. Because of students' religious and privacy concerns, communal showers have been replaced with individual and private spaces for bathing.

A court case in Colorado noted that students have a reduced expectation of personal privacy in regards to "communal undress" while showering after physical education classes.

== See also ==
- Mixed bathing
- Unisex changing rooms
