= Vichy shower =

Type of shower used in spas

A Vichy shower, also known as an affusion shower, is a kind of shower used in spas, featuring a horizontal bar with five to seven shower heads, or holes. Large quantities of warm water are poured over a spa patron while he or she lies in a shallow wet bed, similar to a massage table, but with drainage for the water. The patron typically lies on their back first, and then is rolled onto their stomach.

The Vichy shower originated in Vichy, France, which contains natural mineral springs. These springs inspired the design of the Vichy shower.
