= Wireless speaker =

Loudspeakers that receive audio signals using radio waves

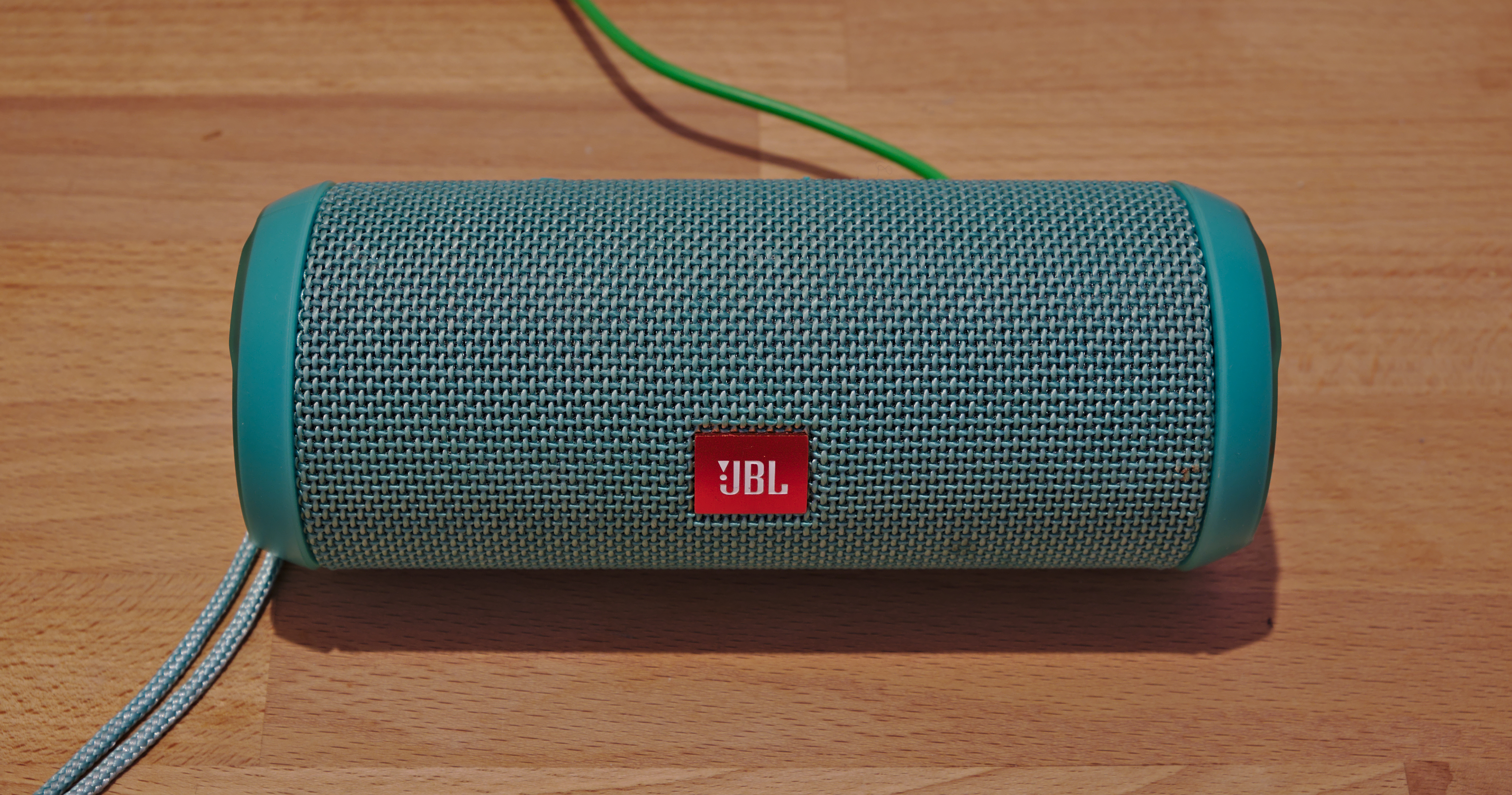
A JBL Flip 3 battery-powered and waterproof Bluetooth speaker connected to a charging cable. The length is ca. 17 cm, diameter 6.4 cm, weight 450 g.

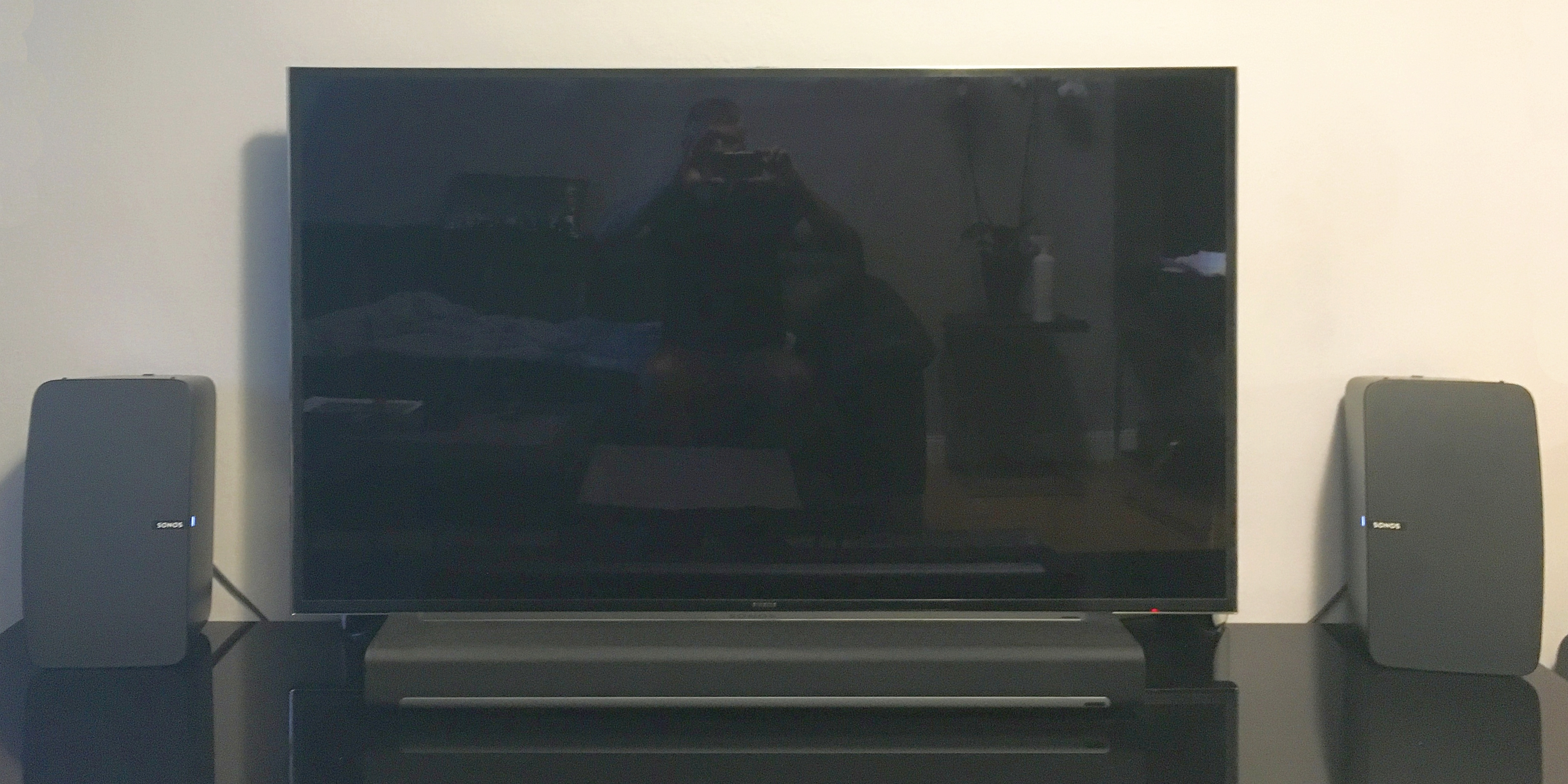
TV set (size 55 inch) with two Sonos Play:5 wireless HiFi speakers (WiFi-based) and a soundbar

Wireless speakers are loudspeakers that receive audio signals using radio frequency (RF) waves rather than over audio cables. The two most popular RF frequencies that support audio transmission to wireless loudspeakers include a variation of WiFi IEEE 802.11, while others depend on Bluetooth to transmit audio data to the receiving speaker.

Apart from the employed RF standard, such speakers can basically be distinguished by their dedicated field of use. Portable wireless speakers for outdoor use are typically designed for ruggedness, portability and battery life, whereas stationary wireless speakers with a focus on good sound quality are meant to be used in home audio systems or surround sound systems for TV or video. Further, types for special applications like waterproof speakers for use in the shower or speakers for a voice assistant may intermix between the properties of the two former.

== Overview ==
Wireless speakers are composed of two units: a main speaker unit combining the loudspeaker itself with an RF receiver, and an RF transmitter unit. The transmitter connects to the audio output of any audio devices such as hi-fi equipment, televisions, computers, MP3 players, etc. An RCA plug is normally used to achieve this. The receiver is positioned where the listener wants the sound to be, providing the freedom to move the wireless speakers around without the need of using cables. The receiver/speaker unit generally contains an amplifier to boost the audio signal to the loudspeaker; it is powered either by batteries or by an AC electric outlet.

The signal frequency range used by wireless speakers is generally the same as that used by cordless telephones – 900 MHz. The RF signal can traverse walls and floors/ceilings. Most manufacturers claim the signal transmits over a range of 150 to 300 feet (50 to 100 m). Many wireless speakers feature variable transmission channels that can be set using a tuning knob to overcome potential RF interference with other nearby wireless devices, such as cordless phones or baby monitors.

Some wireless speakers use the 2.4 GHz frequency band. The WiSA standard uses the 5 GHz frequency band.

=== Sound quality ===
The most basic models only offer an output power of 3W, which does not allow for an optimal sound quality. Mid-range models go up to 5W and high-end models can go up to 10W and beyond.

The number of speakers can also vary: while entry-level models are limited to a single speaker, more elaborate models can offer two, and thus have stereo sound. Some wireless speakers add a passive radiator to improve low frequencies and achieve deeper sound.

=== Bluetooth ===
Recent models generally use Bluetooth 4.0, 5.0, and sometimes 6.0, and wireless speakers generally have a range of 10 meters, more or less. The radio frequencies of Bluetooth used by these speakers are low enough that devices do not need to have line of sight from the music playback end and the signals can pass through walls and objects, making them useful in a wide variety of applications.

Some speakers may benefit from the NFC system to facilitate pairing with the source device.

=== Battery ===
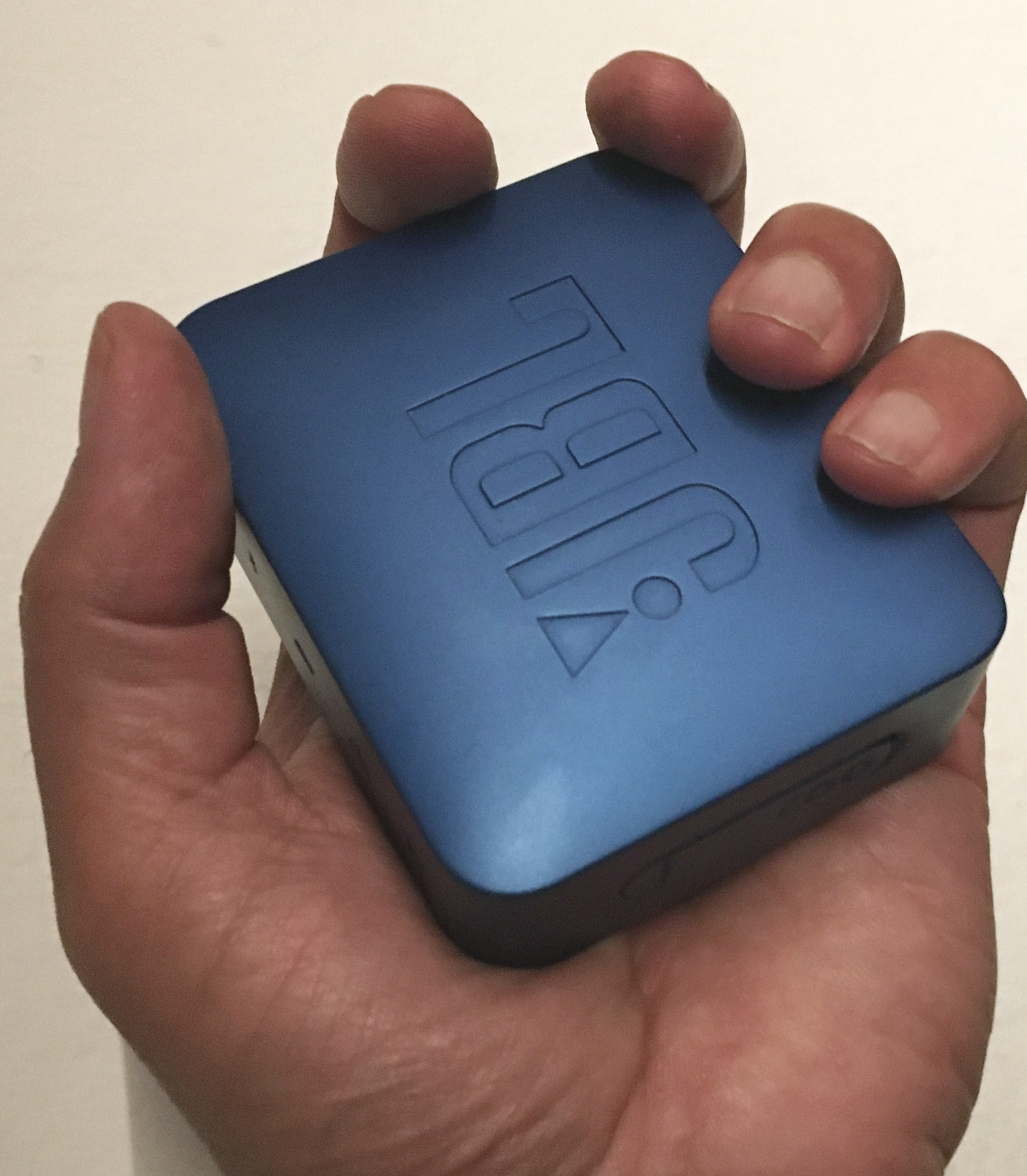
A portable speaker which marks the lower end of the size range of Bluetooth speakers constructed primarily for the reproduction of music

Wireless speakers use rechargeable batteries to power them. Almost all wireless speakers operate on rechargeable batteries that are not replaceable, so that the lifespan of these speakers is that of their batteries. Some speaker models with a large battery capacity can also act as a power bank to charge another device to full capacity, such as a mobile phone.

They are generally recharged with either a C8 appliance plug or a more universal USB connector, mainly through either mini or micro-USB or USB-C connectors. Other speakers utilize proprietary connectors such as Apple's Lightning connector. The complete charging cycle a speaker generally varies from 3 to 6 hours.

== Hybrid wireless speakers ==
Starting 2015, some wireless speakers integrate VoIP telephony functions. Other models have an integrated FM radio. The higher end models add an LCD screen to make it easier to select and store radio stations.

Most wireless speakers have a built-in microphone, which allows to receive and make calls using a mobile phone in hands-free mode. When a call comes in, the music automatically shuts off and resumes as soon as the call ends.

With the development of voice assistants, manufacturers have integrated the ability to pair them with their devices. This way, commands can be passed to the speaker via the integrated microphone, which will then be executed by the voice assistant.

== Shower speaker ==
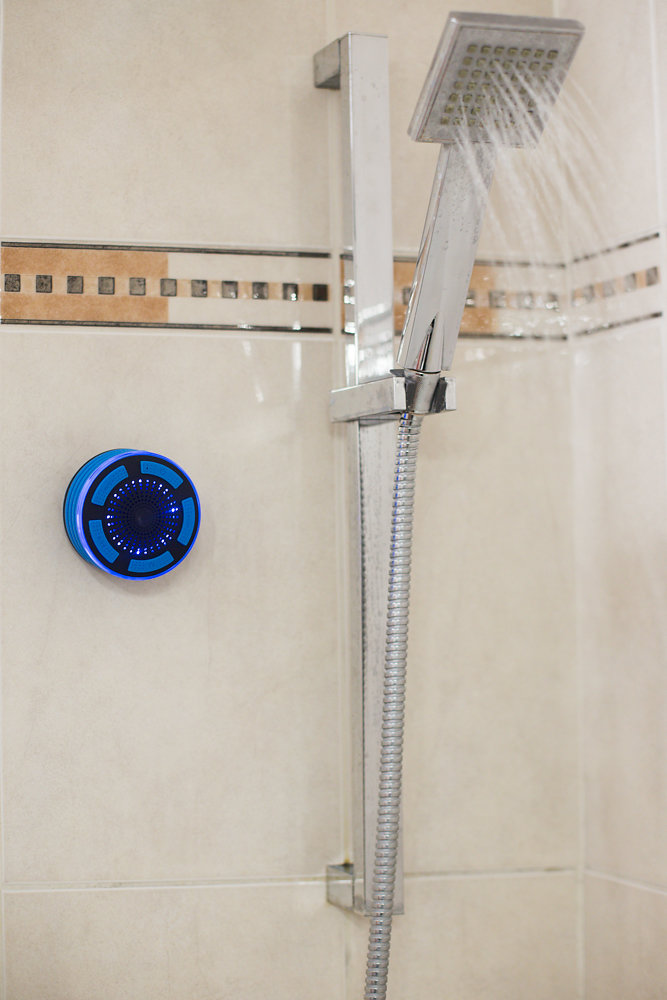
A shower speaker attached to the wall of a shower with a suction cup

A shower speaker is a Bluetooth speaker designed for use in humid environments such as showers or more generally in the bathroom. There are also shower speakers using Wi-Fi, although this is more rare.

The speaker must first be connected or paired with a device, typically using Bluetooth, although you can also use other methods, such as auxiliary audio inputs. In general, it is a smartphone or tablet. It is this device that will serve as the source for the music that will be played through the speaker.

A shower speaker must first of all be able to withstand water splashes. This resistance is expressed by an IP (Ingress Protection) index that must be mentioned on the product. The most frequent indexes encountered are the IPX4 index, which indicates that the device is protected against splashes. Other models offer superior protection, such as IPX7. In this case, the enclosure is completely submersible in water to a depth of 1 meter for half an hour. It is then considered waterproof. Some models occasionally extend their protection up to index 8.

The shower speaker must be able to be installed in all environments. This is why manufacturers have planned to equip their devices with different ways of fixing them. The suction cup is the most basic system and is found on entry-level speakers. Its main disadvantage is poor adhesion to the shower wall, which can cause the unit to fall off. The mounting bracket is the safest system to fix the speaker, but requires drilling a hole in the wall. The carabiner clip allows the speaker to hang from the shower curtain bar. It is only suitable for the smallest and lightest models.

== See also ==
- Smart speaker
- Loudspeaker enclosure
- Full-range speaker
- Shower radio
