= Emergency eyewash and safety shower station =

Laboratory safety apparatus

ISO 7010 symbols for "emergency eyewash" (left) and "emergency shower" (right).

An emergency eyewash and safety shower station are essential equipment for every laboratory that uses chemicals and hazardous substances. Emergency eyewash and safety shower stations serve the purpose of reducing workplace injury and keeping workers away from various dangers.

== Types ==
There are several types of emergency eyewash station and safety shower station systems, including safety showers, eyewash stations, drench hoses, combination units, and eyewash bottles.

=== Safety shower ===
How to use Emergency Shower.

A safety shower is a unit designed to wash an individual's head and body which has come into contact with hazardous chemicals. Large volumes of water are used and a user may need to take off any clothing that has been contaminated with hazardous chemicals. Safety showers cannot be used for flushing an individual's eyes, due to the high pressure of water from the shower, which can damage a user's eyes.

=== Eyewash station ===
How to use Emergency Eye wash.

An eyewash station is a unit for washing off chemicals or substances that might have splashed into an individual's eyes before he or she can seek further medical attention. The individual needs to wash their eyes for at least 15 minutes.

=== Drench hose ===
A drench hose is an equipment that can spray water to a specific spot of the chemical exposure on individual's body. The benefit of a drench hose is that it can be applied to an individual who cannot reach a normal eyewash or shower station or in the case where the eyewash and shower station are unavailable.

=== Combination unit ===
A combination unit is where other units such as a shower station, eyewash station, and drench hose share the same water supply plumbing. This unit is useful in a laboratory where hazardous chemicals with different properties are used.

=== Eyewash bottle ===
Also known as a personal eyewash unit, it is a supplementary for eyewash stations. However, eyewash stations cannot be replaced by eyewash bottles since they do not meet safety standards. Eyewash bottles allow an individual to flush the injured area immediately, or until the individual can reach the fixed eyewash station. Early eyewashes were designed with a single rinsing stream, but recent advancements have made eyewashes capable of flushing both eyes simultaneously. A pH neutral solution for emergency eyewash may also be chosen to reduce the danger from contaminants if strong acids or alkali chemicals are presented.

== Specification and requirement ==
In the United States, Occupational Safety and Health Administration (OSHA) regulations on emergency eyewash and shower station are contained in 29 C.F.R. 1910.151 (c), which provides that "Where the eyes or body of any person may be exposed to injurious corrosive materials, suitable facilities for quick drenching or flushing of the eyes and body shall be provided within the work area for immediate emergency use." However, OSHA regulation is unclear defining what facility is required. From this reason, American National Standards Institute (ANSI) has developed a standard (ANSI/ISEA Z358.1-2014) for emergency eyewash and shower stations, including the design of such stations. In Europe, Safety Showers are governed by EN standard EN15154.

=== Safety shower ===
- The path from the hazard to the safety shower shall be free of obstructions and tripping hazards.
- Water supply should be enough to provide at least 20 gallons per minute of water for 15 minutes (Section 4.1.2, 4.5.5).
- Hand free valve should be able to open within one second and remain open until it is manually closed (Section 4.2, 4.1.5).
- The top of the water column shall not be lower than 82 in (210 cm) and no higher than 96 in (240 cm) above the surface floor the user is standing on(Section 5.1.3, 4.5.4).
- Center of the water column should be at least 16 in (41 cm) away from any obstruction (Section 4.1.4, 4.5.4).
- Actuator should be easily accessible and easily located. It should be no more than 69 in (180 cm) above the surface floor the user is standing on (Section 4.2).
- At 60 in (150 cm) above the floor, the water pattern should be 20 in (51 cm) in diameter (Section 4.1.4).
- If shower enclosure is provided. It should provide 34" in diameter of unobstructed space (86.4 cm) (Section 4.3).
- Water temperature of safety shower station should be within 60–100 °F (16–38 °C).
- Safety shower stations should have highly visible and well lit signage.

=== Eyewash station ===
- The path from the hazard to the Eyewash or Eye/Face wash shall be free of obstructions and tripping hazards.
- Eyewash station shall flush both eyes simultaneously within gauge guidelines (Eyewash gauge detailed in ANSI/ISEA Z358.1-2014) (Section 5.1.8).
- Eye or Eye/Face wash shall provide a controlled flow of water that is non-injurious to the user (Section 5.1.1).
- Nozzles and flushing fluid shall be protected from airborne contaminants (dust covers), and shall not require a separate motion by the operator when activating the equipment (section 5.1.3).
- Eyewashes must deliver 0.4 gpm for 15 minutes, Eye/Face washes must provide 3 gpm for 15 minutes.
- The top of the Eye or Eye/Face wash water flow must not fall below 33 in (84 cm) and can be no higher than 53 in (130 cm) from the floor surface floor the user is standing on (Section 5.4.4).
- The head or heads of the Eyewash or Eye/Face wash must be 6 in (15 cm) away from any obstructions (Section 5.4.4).
- The valve must allow for 1 second operation and the valve shall remain open without the use of the operator's hands until intentionally closed. (Section 5.1.4, 5.2).
- Manual or automatic actuators shall be easy to locate and readily accessible to the user (Section 5.2).
- Water temperature of Eye or Eye/Face wash station should be within 60–100 °F (16–38 °C).
- Eye or Eye/Face wash stations should have highly visible and well lit signage.

== Location ==
Safety showers and eyewash stations should be within 10 seconds walking distance or 55 feet (appendix B) from the hazard and must be located on the same level as the hazard, so the individual does not have to go up or down the stairs when an accident occurs. Moreover, the path way should be clear and free of obstructions.
