= Up-N-Away (down-sliding shower door) =

Up-N-Away was the name of a vertical-sliding bath/shower door manufactured by Unitspan Architectural Systems, Inc. The bathtub shower doors had vertical tracks instead of horizontal, and closed downward or opened upwards rather than sideways. The channel tracks were vertical on each side with only a low profile sill necessary across the front rim of the tub enclosure to direct water back into the tub when in use with door closed; this enabled the entire front edge/rim of the tub enclosure to be relatively flat when the doors were open. The vertical-sliding doors were counterbalanced so they could be kept up and out of the way, but slid to lower positions for showering. Within the vertical track channels, the lower left and right edge of each sliding door attached to counterweighted ropes with nylon hanger brackets. The downward-closing bath shower doors aimed to solve the disadvantages of conventional, sideways-sliding doors (for example, it allowed for more room to sit on the edge of the tub when bathing a child), and to provide more convenience, relaxation and luxury. They were at first marketed on a store- or factory-to-consumer basis, with do-it-yourself installation required.
