= François Merry Delabost =

French physician

- Born: August 29, 1836; Saint-Saire, France
- Died: March 11, 1918 (aged 81); Rouen, France
- Awards: Legion of Honor

François Merry Delabost (29 August 1836 – 11 March 1918) was a French physician.

From 1864 to his death in 1918, he served as the chief-physician in the Bonne Nouvelle prison in Rouen. He is credited with conceiving of using a shower for washing and hygiene, when he first installed showers in the prison in 1872.
