= WiSA =

WiSA Association
- WiSA, LLC
- Nickname: Wireless Speaker and Audio Association
- Parent organization: WiSA Technologies, Inc.

WiSA Technologies, Inc.
- Company type: Public
- Traded as: Nasdaq: WISA
- Industry: Semiconductors
- Predecessor: Summit Semiconductor, LLC (2010-2017); Summit Semiconductor, Inc. (2017–2018); Summit Wireless Technologies, Inc. (2018–2022)
- Founded: July 23, 2010; 15 years ago
- Headquarters: United States, San Jose, California
- Products: Wireless audio technology
- Website: www.wisatechnologies.com

WiSA is a hardware and software standard for wirelessly transmitting digital audio from an audio source to wireless speakers. The standard is promoted by the Wireless Speaker and Audio Association (WiSA Association), which comprises consumer electronics manufacturers, retailers, and technology companies. The standard is based on technology from the WiSA Technologies corporation.

WiSA removes the need to run speaker wires or RCA cables between an AV receiver (or similar device) and speakers in a home theater or home audio setup, though independent power to the speakers is required.

== Technical specifications ==
- Maximum channels: 8 channels
- Uncompressed audio
  - Bit depth: Up to 24 bits per channel
  - Sample rate: Up to 96 kHz
- Latency: 2.6 ms at 96 kHz, or 5.2 ms at 48 kHz
- Synchronization between speakers: ±2 μs
- Maximum supported room size: 30 ft × 30 ft
- Not designed to span multiple rooms
- Transmission band: U-NII 5 GHz spectrum

WiSA has no support mandated for audio compression codecs. WiSA permits support for object-based surround sound schemes such as DTS:X or Dolby Atmos, though those features are not mandated in devices.
