= Shower radio =

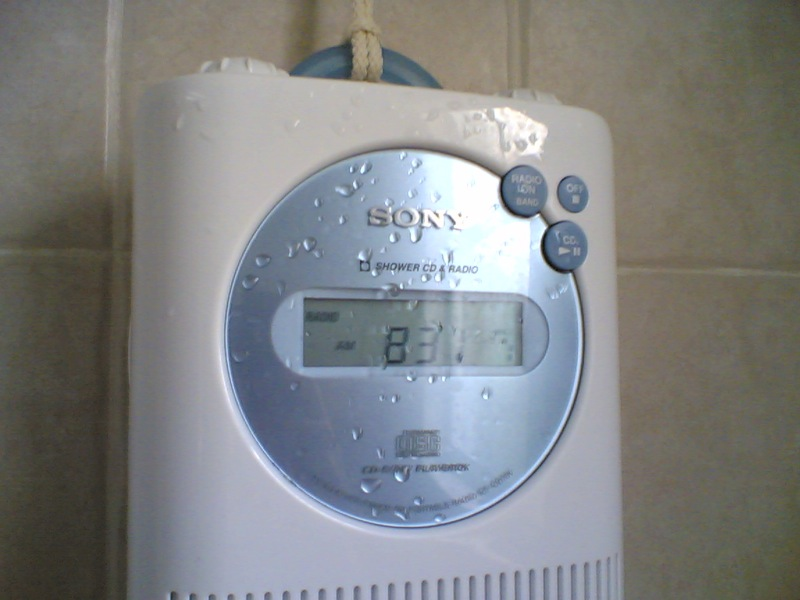
Shower CD & Radio with a clock

A shower radio is a battery-powered radio that is waterproofed to allow it to be used in a bathroom or other wet environment. More generally, a shower radio is a shower speaker with an integrated radio functionality. Some versions also include a CD player and/or a clock. Shower radios generally lack headphone jacks and AC adapter ports, which could short out or electrocute the user. For the same reason, they also tend to lack external antennas.

The first mass-produced shower radio was patented in 1985 by Andrew R. Mark, of Stamford, Connecticut. The product was marketed by Salton Inc. under the brand name Wet Tunes.

There are varying designs; some are meant to be hung from a pipe or shower rod, while others can be stuck to the wall of the shower using a suction cup or something similar. Shower radios may be analog or digital. More recently, water-powered and wind-up radio designs have been produced to completely remove the requirement for batteries, though smaller capacity rechargeable batteries are used to some extent on hand-crank devices.

Shower radios can be paired with personal FM transmitters, allowing users to enjoy their favorite album or playlist from a portable media device while keeping it safe and dry outside the shower.

== See also ==
- Shower speaker
