= Public toilet =

Room or building with toilets for the general public

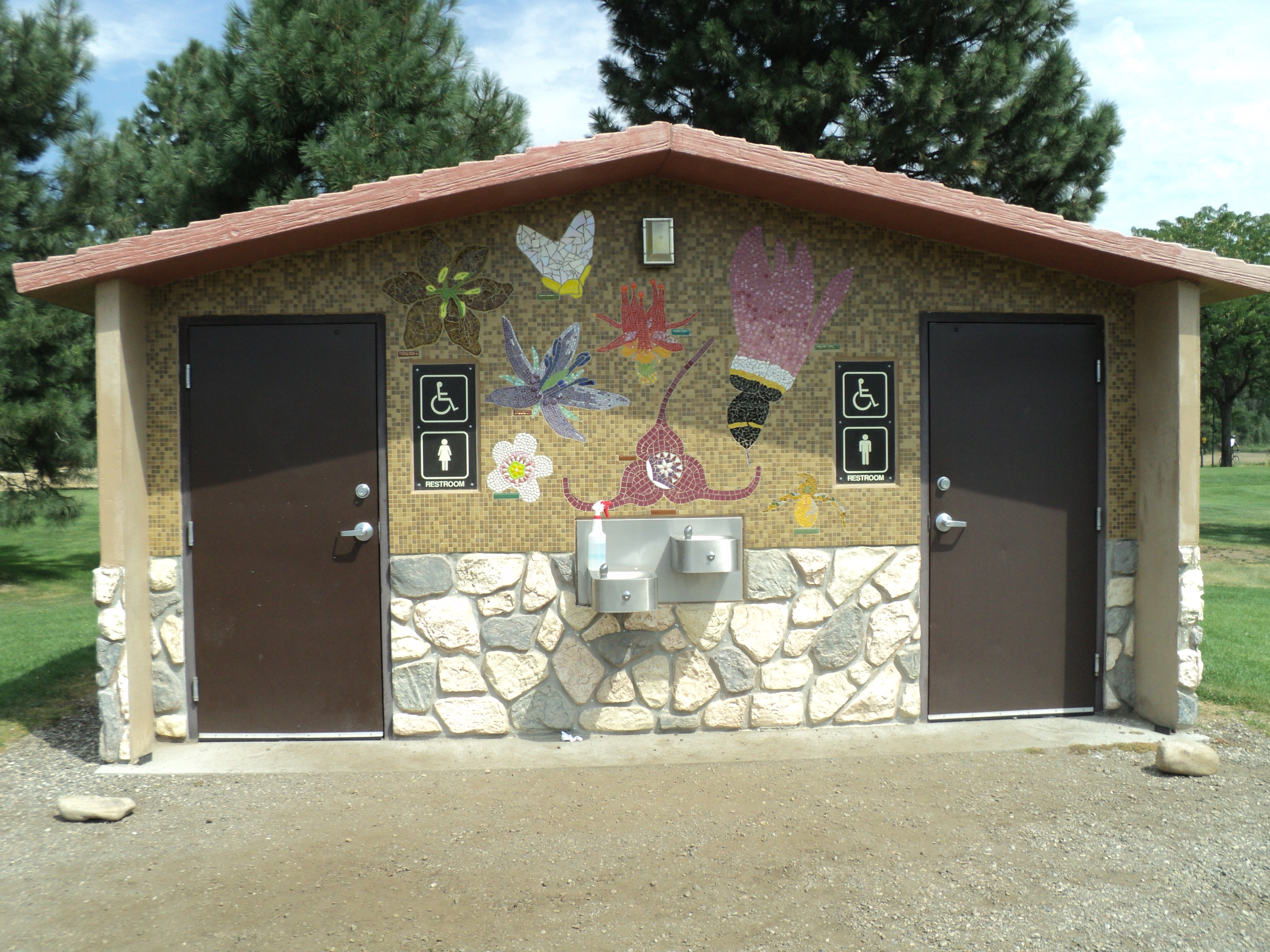
Accessible female and male public washrooms on the Boise River Greenbelt in Idaho, US, featuring public art

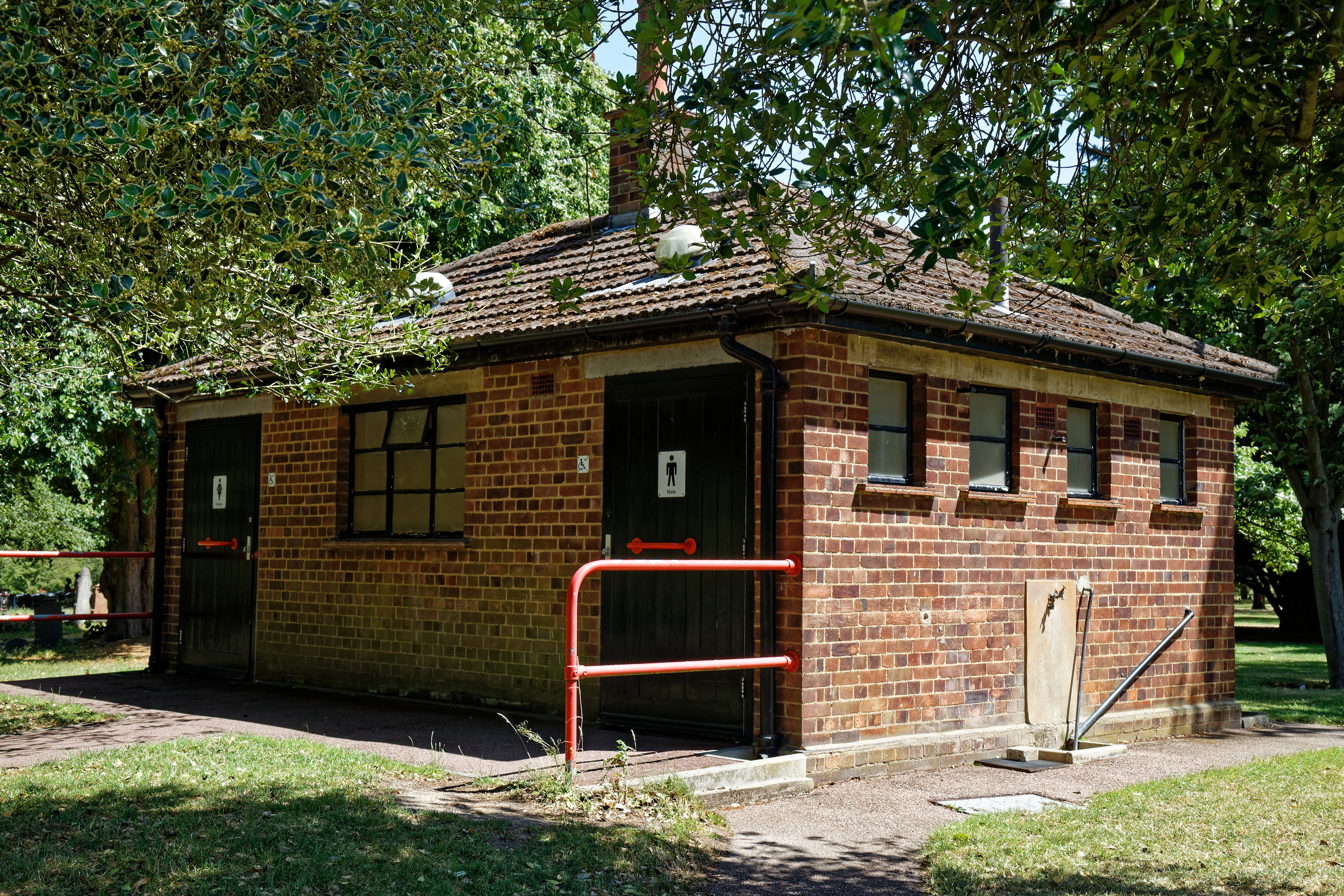
A public toilet in London, England

A public toilet, also known as a restroom, bathroom or washroom, is a room or small building with sinks and toilets (and sometimes urinals) for use by the general public. The facilities are available to customers, travelers, employees of a business, school pupils or prisoners. Public toilets are typically found in many different places: inner-city locations, offices, factories, schools, universities and other places of work and study. Similarly, museums, cinemas, bars, restaurants, and entertainment venues usually provide public toilets. Railway stations, filling stations, and long-distance public transport vehicles such as trains, ferries, and planes usually provide toilets for general use. Portable toilets are often available at large outdoor events.

Public toilets are commonly separated by sex (or gender), although some are unisex (gender-neutral), especially for small or single-occupancy public toilets. Public toilets are sometimes accessible to people with disabilities. Depending on the culture, there may be varying degrees of separation between males and females and different levels of privacy. Typically, the entire room, or a stall or cubicle containing a toilet, is lockable. Urinals, if present in a male toilet, are typically mounted on a wall, with or without dividers between them.

Local authorities or commercial businesses may provide public toilet facilities. Some are unattended, while others are staffed by attendants. In many cultures it is customary to tip the attendant, especially if they provide a specific service, such as might be the case at upscale nightclubs or restaurants. Public toilets may be municipally owned or managed and entered directly from the street. Alternatively, they may be within buildings that, while privately owned, allow public access, such as department stores, or the may be limited to the business's customers, such as in restaurant. Some public toilets are free of charge, while others charge a fee. In the latter case they are also called pay toilets and sometimes have charging turnstiles. In the most basic form, a public toilet may be a simple street urinal, known as a pissoir, after the French term.

Public toilets are known by many other names depending on the country; examples are restroom, bathroom, men's room, women's room, powder room (US), washroom (Canada), and toilet, lavatory, water closet (W.C.), and ladies' and gents' (Europe).

== Alternative names ==
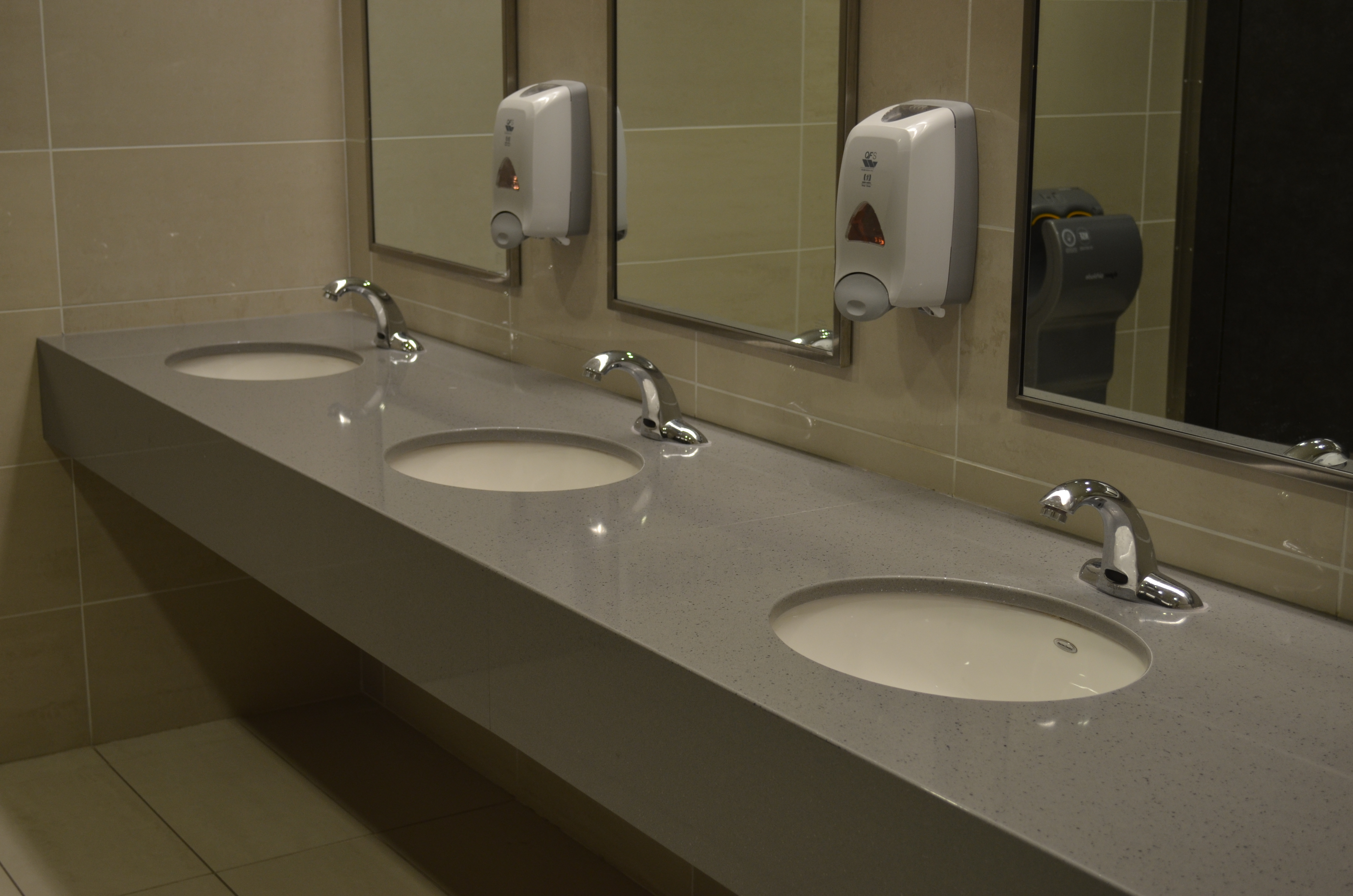
Washing fixtures at York University, Toronto, Ontario

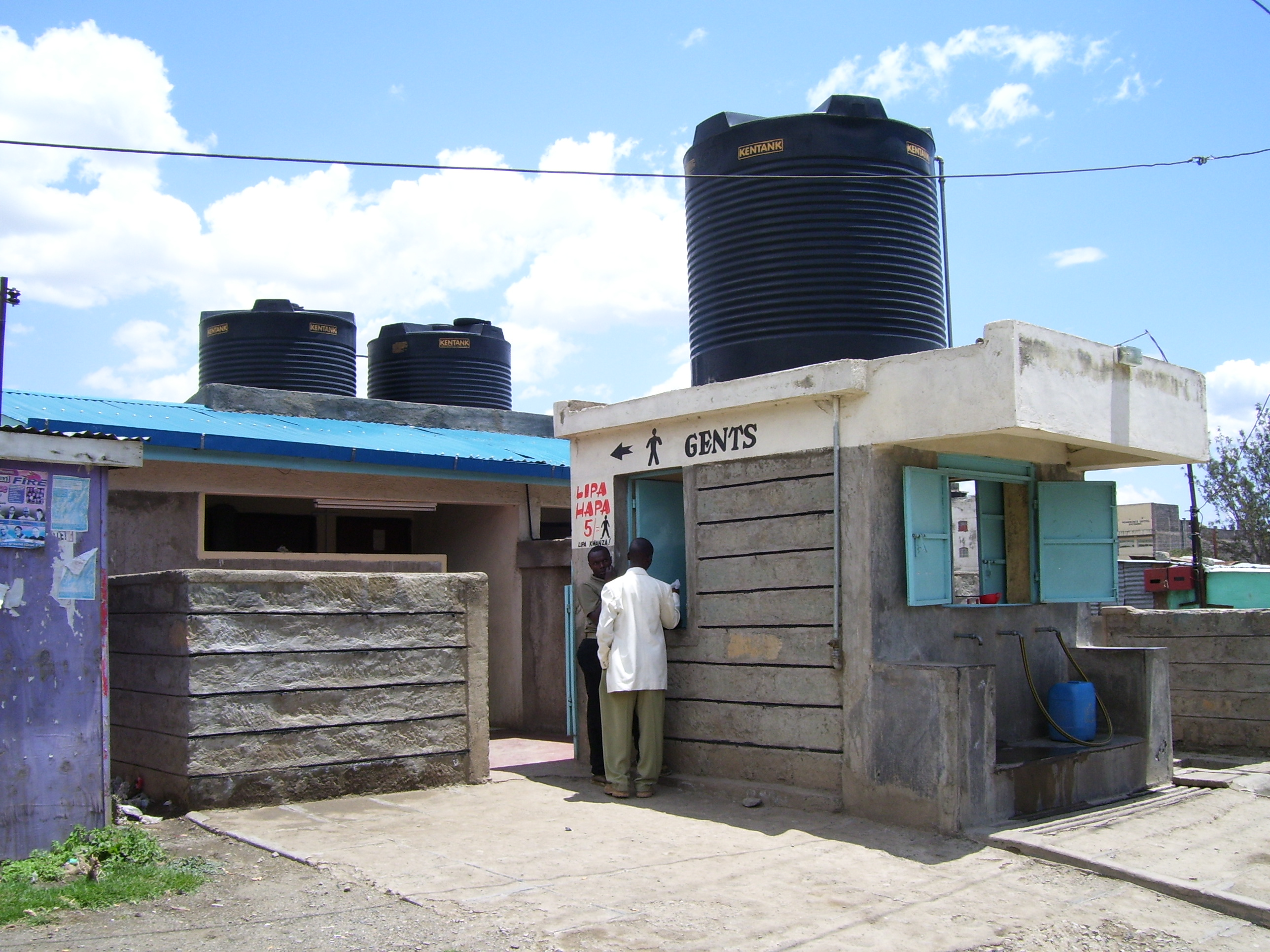
Public pay toilet in Kenya

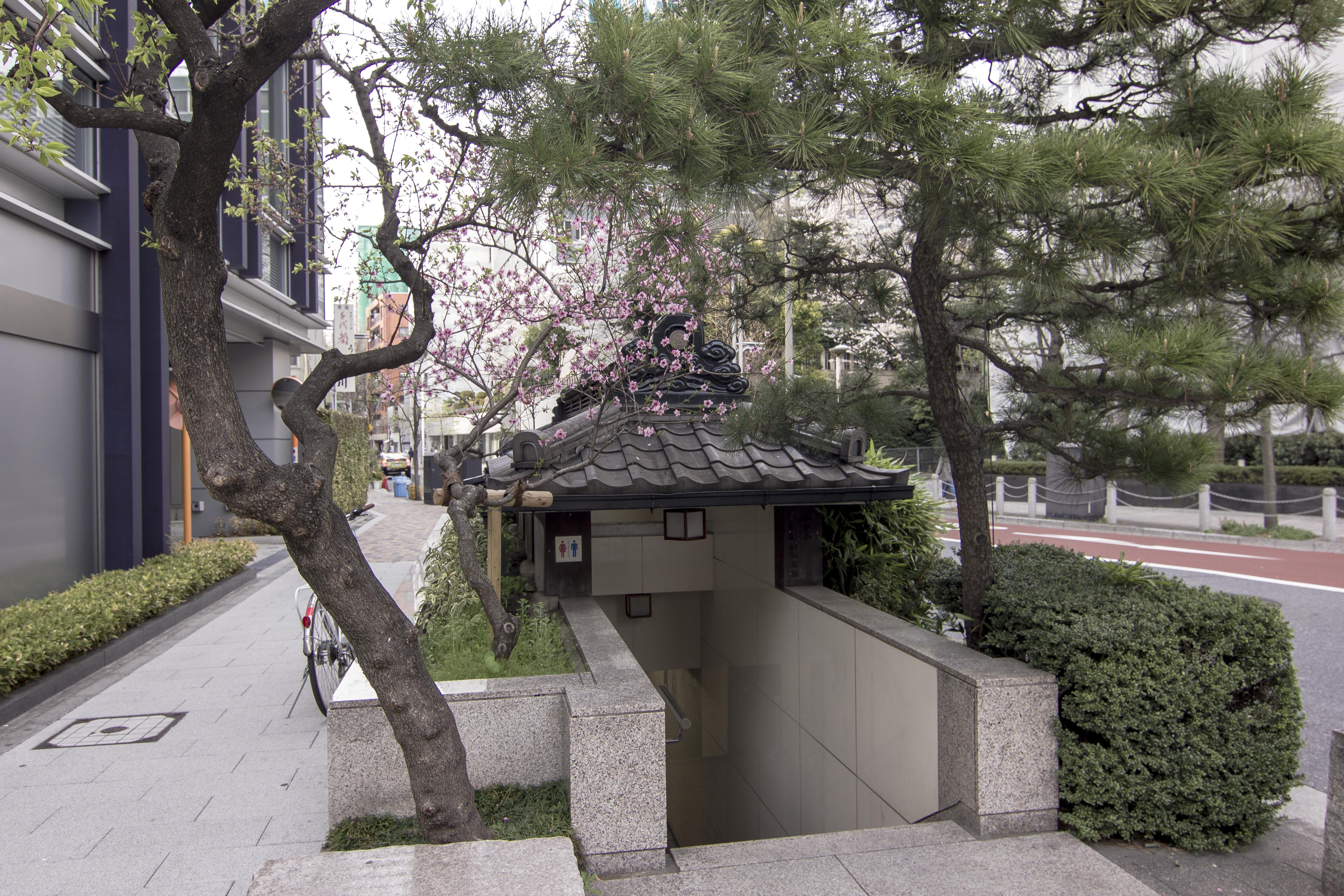
Entrance to an underground public toilet in Japan

Public toilets are known by many names in different varieties of English.

In American English, "restroom" commonly denotes a facility featuring toilets and sinks designed for use by the public, but "restroom" and "bathroom" are often used interchangeably for any room with a toilet (both in public and in private homes). "Restroom" is considered by some to be slightly more formal or polite. "Bathroom" is quite common in schools. "Comfort station" sometimes refers to a visitor welcome center such as those in national parks. The term restroom derived from the fact that in the early 1900s through to the middle of the century up-scale restaurants, theatres and performing facilities would often have comfortable chairs or sofas located within or in a room directly adjacent to the actual toilet and sink facilities, something which can be seen in some movies of the time period. An example of this is the description of a "movie palace" which was opening in 1921 which was described as including " ... a rest-room for the fair sex and a lounging room for the sterner sex ... off these rooms are the toilets."

In Canadian English, public facilities are frequently called and signed as "washrooms", although usage varies regionally. The word "toilet" generally denotes the fixture itself rather than the room. The word "washroom" is rarely used to mean "utility room" or "mud room" as it is in some parts of the United States. "Bathroom" is generally used to refer to the room in a person's home that includes a bathtub or shower while a room with only a toilet and sink in a person's residence is typically called a "washroom" because one would wash one's hands in it upon returning home or before a meal or a "powder room" because women would fix their make-up on their faces in that room. These terms are the terms typically used on floor plans for residences or other buildings. Real estate advertisements for residences often refer to "three-piece washrooms" (include a bathtub or shower) and "two-piece washrooms" (only toilet and sink). In public athletic or aquatic facilities, showers are available in locker rooms.

In Britain, Australia, Hong Kong, Singapore, and New Zealand, the terms in use are "public toilet", "public lavatory" (abbreviated "lav"), "public convenience", and more informally, "public loo". As public toilets were traditionally signed as "gentlemen" or "ladies", the colloquial terms "the gents' room" and "the ladies' room", or simply "the gents" and "the ladies" are used to indicate the facilities themselves. The British Toilet Association, sponsor of the Loo of the Year Awards, refers to public toilets collectively as "away-from-home" toilets.

In Philippine English, "comfort room", or "C.R.", is the most common term in use.

Some European languages use words cognate with "toilet" (e.g. les toilettes in French; туалет (tualet) in Russian), or the initialism "W.C.", an abbreviation for "water closet", an older term for the flush toilet. In Slavic languages, such as Russian and Belarusian, the term sanuzel (санузел; short for sanitarny uzel — sanitary unit/hub) is sometimes used for public facilities which include a toilet, sink, and possibly a shower, bathtub, and / or bidet. Public urinals (pissoir) are known in several Romance languages by the name of a Roman Emperor: vespasienne in French and vespasiani in Italian. Mosques, madrassas (schools), and other places Muslims gather, have public sex-separated "ablution rooms" since Islam requires specific procedures for cleansing parts of the body before prayer. These rooms normally adjoin the toilets, which are also subject to Muslim hygienical jurisprudence and Islamic toilet etiquette.

== Types ==
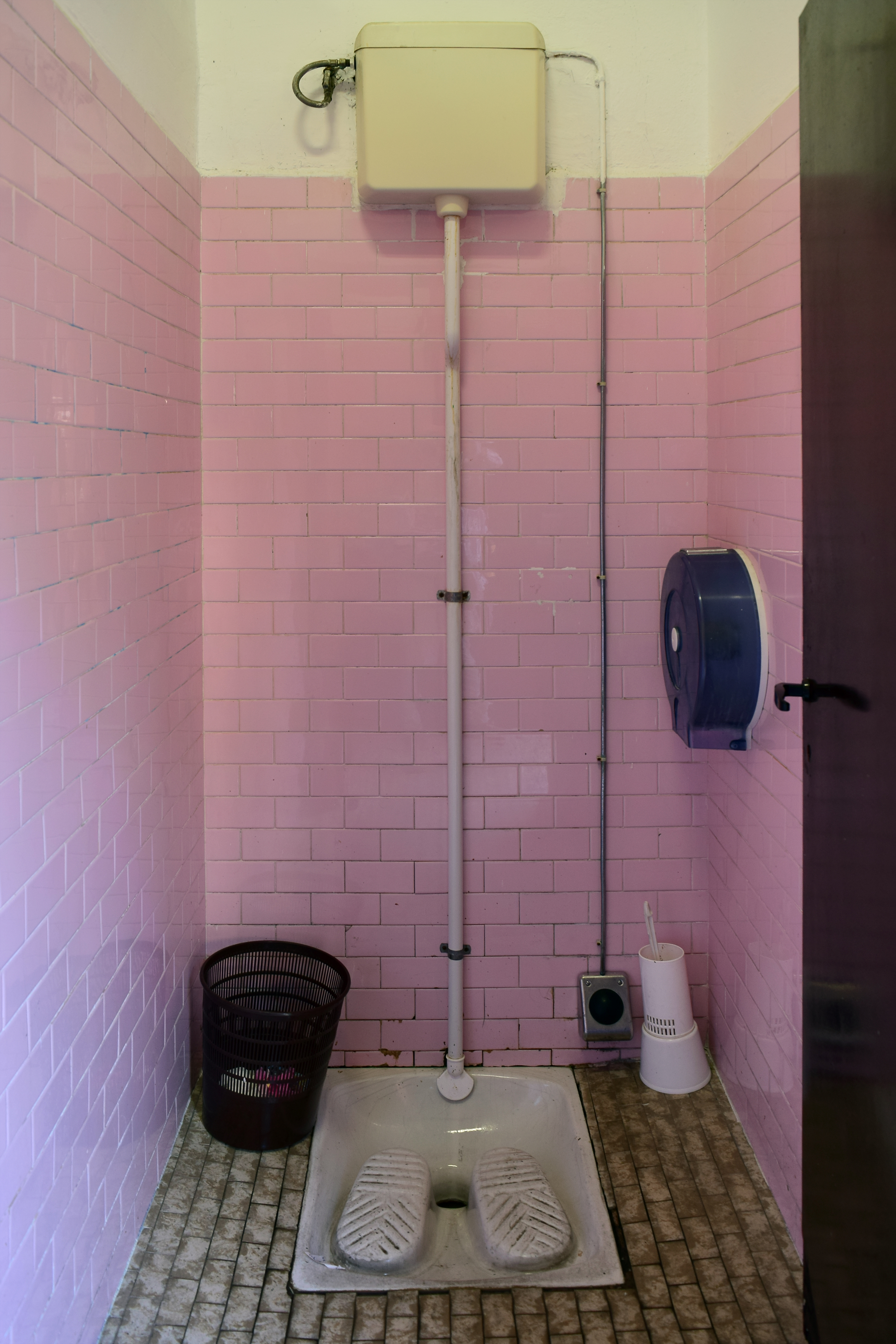
Squat toilet at a train station in Varenna, Italy

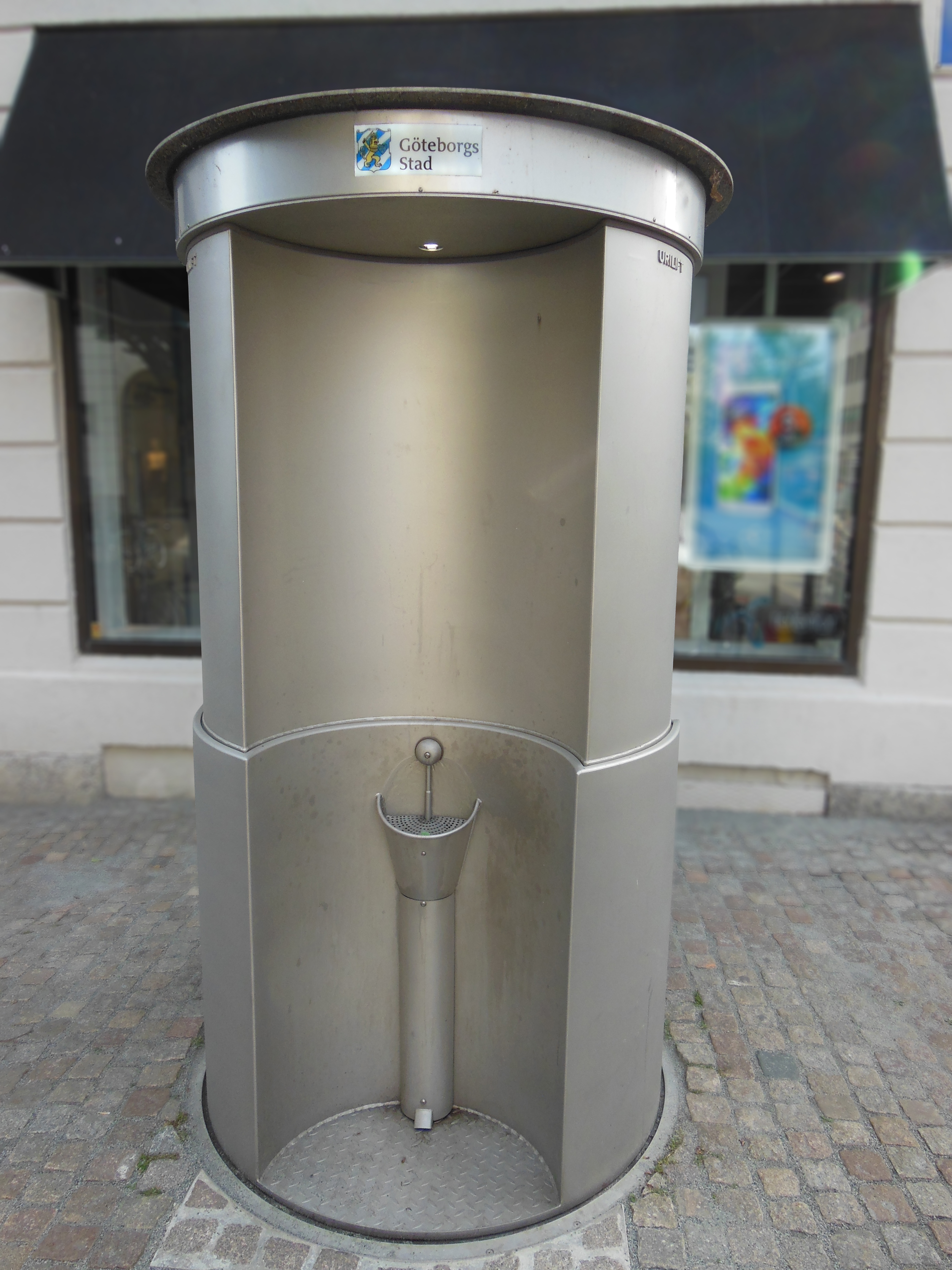
Public telescopic urinal (Urilift) in Gothenburg

Many public toilets are permanent small buildings visible to passers-by on the street. Others are underground, including older facilities in Britain and Canada. Contemporary street toilets include automatic, self-cleaning toilets in self-contained pods; an example is the Sanisette, which first became popular in France. As part of its campaign against open defecation, the Indian government introduced the remotely-monitored eToilet to some public spaces in 2014.

Public toilets may use seated toilets—as in most Western countries—or squat toilets. Squat toilets are common in many Asian and African countries, and, to a lesser extent, in Southern European countries. In many of those countries, anal cleansing with water is also the cultural norm and easier to perform while squatting than seated.

Another traditional type that has been modernized is the screened French street urinal known as a pissoir (vespasienne).

The telescopic toilet is designed to extend and retract vertically from a cylinder relative to street level depending on the time of day. It is typically installed in entertainment districts and operational only during weekends, evenings, and nights. The first such toilet was a telescopic urinal invented in the Netherlands, which now also offers pop-up toilets for women.

Private firms may maintain permanent public toilets. The companies are then permitted to use the external surfaces of the enclosures for advertising. The installations are part of a street furniture contract between the out-of-home advertising company and the city government and allow these public conveniences to be installed and maintained without requiring funds from the municipal budget.

Various portable toilet technologies are used as public toilets. Portables can be moved into place where and when needed and are popular at outdoor festivals and events. A portable toilet can either be connected to the local sewage system or store the waste in a holding tank until it is emptied by a vacuum truck. Portable composting toilets require removal of the container to a composting facility.

The standard wheelchair-accessible public toilet features wider doors, ample space for turning, lowered sinks, and grab-bars for safety. Features above and beyond this standard are advocated by the Changing Places campaign. Features include a hoist for an adult, a full-sized changing bench, and space for up to two caregivers.

Public toilets have frequently been inaccessible to people with certain disabilities.

== Purposes ==
As an "away-from-home" toilet room, a public toilet can provide far more than access to the toilet for urination and defecation. People also wash their hands, use the mirrors for grooming, get drinking water (e.g. refilling water bottles), attend to menstrual hygiene needs, and use the waste bins. Public toilets may also become places for harassment of others or illegal activities, particularly if principles of Crime prevention through environmental design (CPTED) are not applied in the design of the facility.

== History ==
=== Europe ===
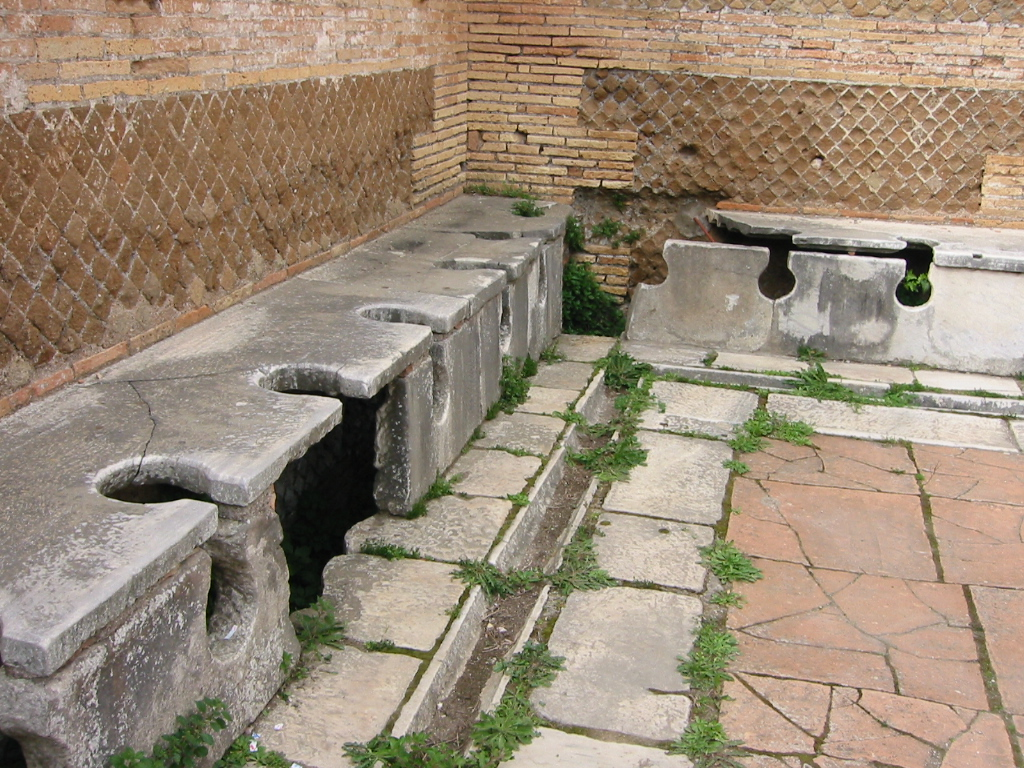
Public toilet remnants from Ancient Roman times in Ostia Antica

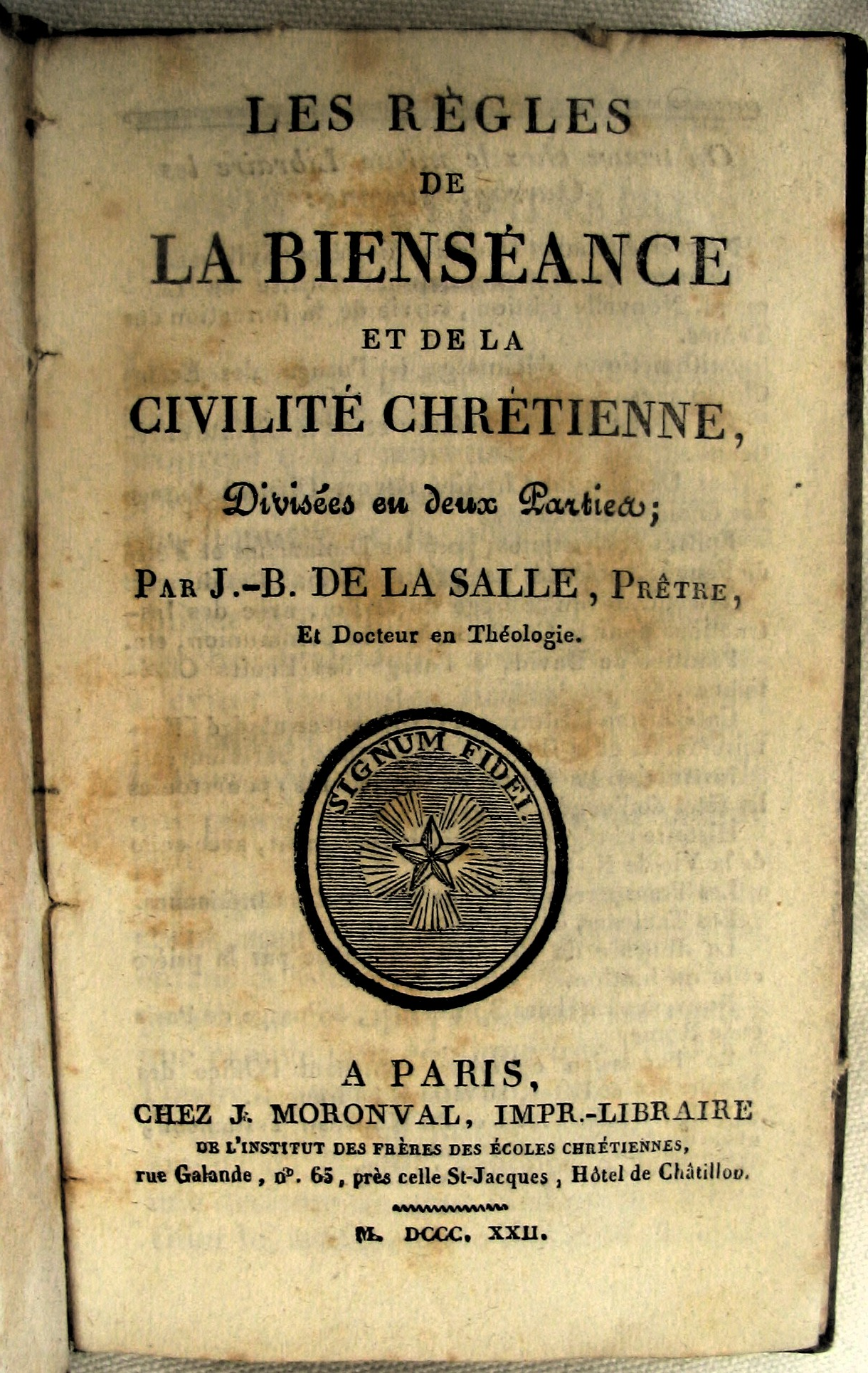
19th century French text explaining proper public toileting practices

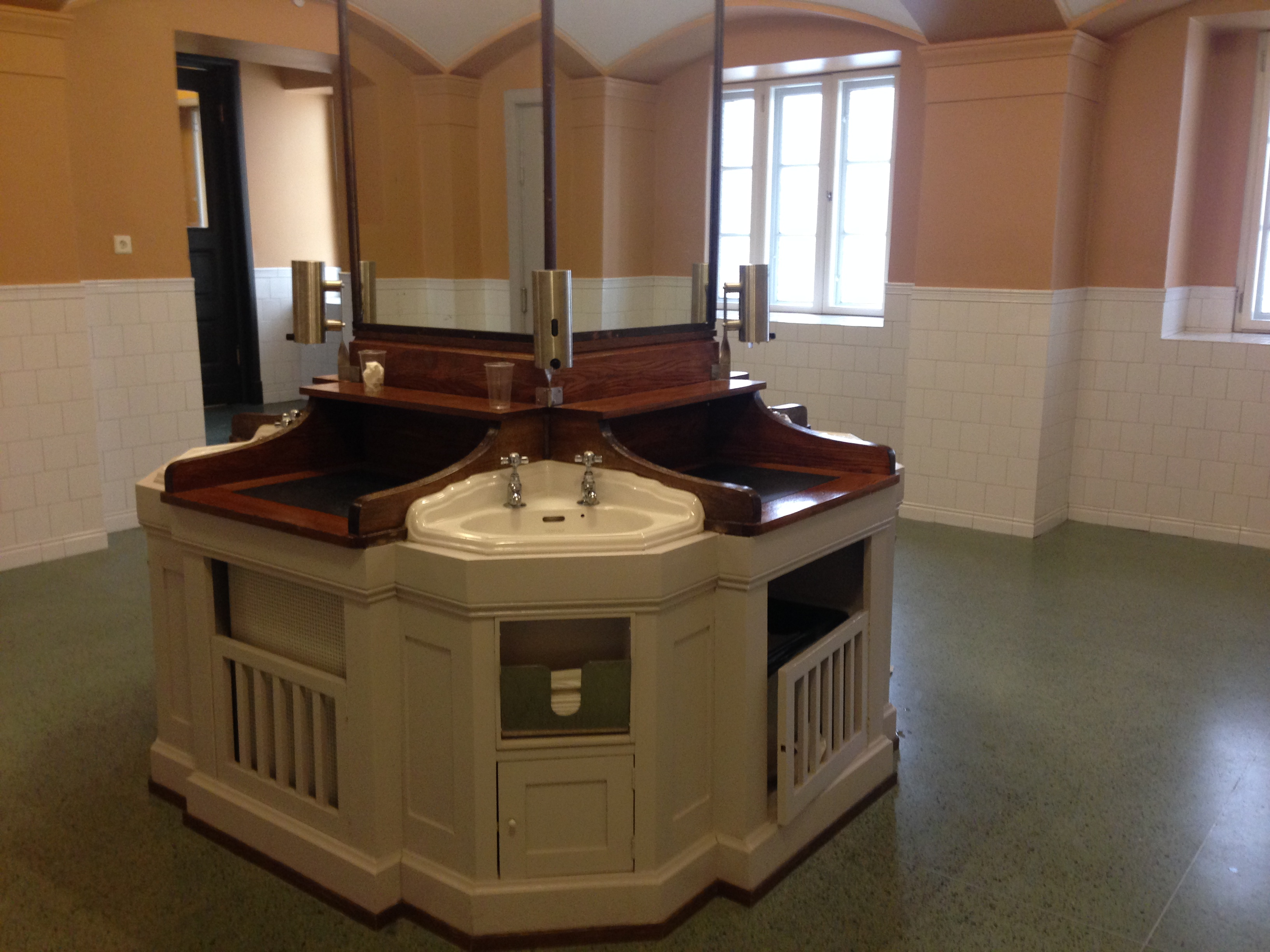
The wash-basins of a 19th-century facility, still in use

Public toilets were part of the sanitation system of ancient Rome. These latrines housed long benches with holes accommodating multiple simultaneous users, with no division between individuals or groups. Using the facilities was considered a social activity.

By the Middle Ages public toilets became uncommon, with only few attested in Frankfurt in 1348, in London in 1383, and in Basel in 1455. A public toilet was built in Ottoman Sarajevo in 1530 just outside a mosque's exterior courtyard wall which is still operating today.

In 1421 Dick Whittington introduced London's first sex-segregated public toilets, Whittington's Longhouse, with 64 seats for men, and 64 for women.

Sociologist Dara Blumenthal notes changing bodily habits, attitudes, and practices regarding hygiene starting in the 16th century, which eventually led to a resurgence of public toilets. While it had been perfectly acceptable to relieve oneself anywhere, civility increasingly required the removal of waste product from contact with others.

New instruction manuals, schoolbooks, and court regulations dictated what was appropriate. For instance, in Galateo: or, A Treatise on Politeness and Delicacy of Manners, Giovanni della Casa states “It does not befit a modest, honourable man to prepare to relieve nature in the presence of other people, nor do up his clothes afterward in their presence. Similarly, he will not wash his hands on returning to decent society from private places, as the reason for his washing will arouse disagreeable thoughts in people.” Historian Lawrence Stone contends that the development of these new behaviours had nothing to do with problems of hygiene and bacterial infection, but rather with conforming to increasingly artificial standards of gentlemanly behaviour.

These standards were internalized at an early age. Over time, much that had to be explained earlier was no longer mentioned, due to successful social conditioning. This resulted in substantial reduction of explicit text on these topics in subsequent editions of etiquette literature; for example, the same passage in Les règles de la bienséance et de la civilité Chrétienne by Jean-Baptiste de la Salle is reduced from 208 words in the 1729 edition, to 74 words in the 1774 edition.

The first modern flush toilet had been invented in 1596, but it did not gain popularity until the Victorian era. When hygiene became a heightened concern, rapid advancements in toilet technology ensued. In the 19th century, large cities in Europe started installing modern flushing public toilets.

George Jennings, the sanitary engineer, introduced public toilets, which he called "monkey closets", to the Crystal Palace for The Great Exhibition of 1851. Public toilets were also known as "retiring rooms." They included separate amenities for men and women, and were the first flush toilet facilities to introduce sex-separation to the activity. The next year, London's first pay public toilet facility was opened.

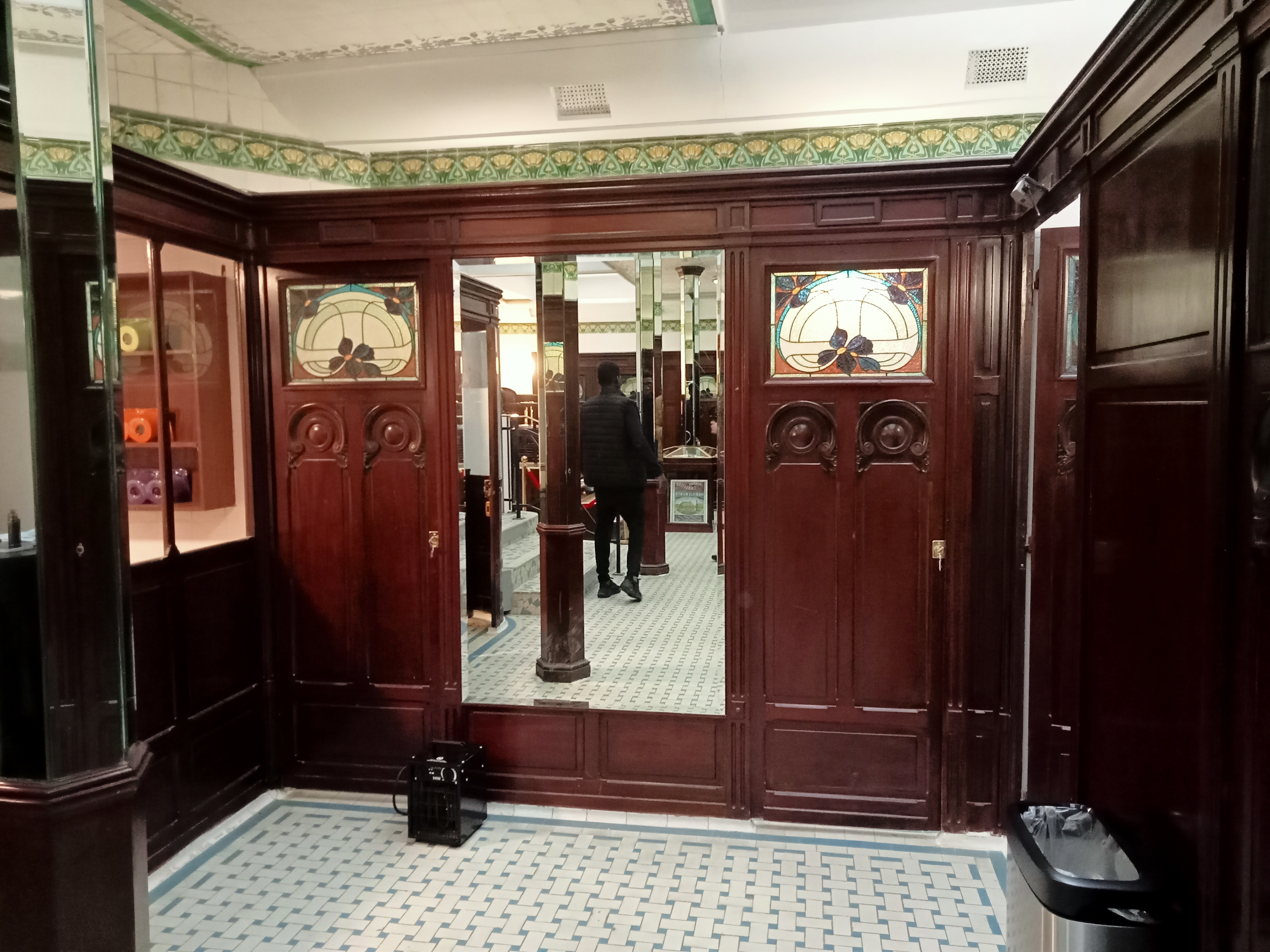
Interior from Lavatory Madeleine, the first and most luxurious underground public toilet in France

Underground public toilets were introduced in the United Kingdom in the Victorian era, in built-up urban areas where no space was available to provide them above ground. The facilities were accessible by stairs, and lit by glass brick on the pavement. Local health boards often built underground public toilets to a high standard, although provisions were higher for men than women. Most have been closed as they did not have disabled access, and were more prone to vandalism and sexual encounters, especially in the absence of an attendant. A few remain in London, but others have been converted into alternative uses such as cafes, bars and even dwellings. In Paris, underground public toilets were introduced in 1905 with the Lavatory Madeleine, which is preserved as a Monument historique.

=== Hong Kong ===
In the early days of the colony of Hong Kong, people would go to the toilet in sewers, barrels or in alleys. Once Hong Kong opened up for trade (1856–1880), the British Hong Kong government determined that the appalling hygiene situation in Hong Kong was becoming critical. Thus, the government set up public toilets (squat toilets) for people in 1867. But these toilets needed to be cleaned and emptied manually every day and were not popular. In 1894, plague broke out in Hong Kong and 2,500 people died, especially public toilet cleaners. The government decided to act, setting up underground toilet facilities to improve this situation, though these toilets also had to be cleaned and emptied manually.

Early in 1940, the colonial government built the first public flush toilet. In 1953, a fire broke out in Shek Kip Mei. After that, the government embarked on a major public housing project in Hong Kong including public toilets for residents. More than ten people shared each toilet and they used them for bathing, doing their laundry as well as going to the toilet. Finally, in the 1970s, the government decided that one toilet for four or five families was insufficient and renovated all public housing providing separate flush pedestal toilets for all residents.

=== United States ===
In the United States, concerns over public health and sanitation spurred the sanitarian movement during the late 1800s. Reforms to standardize plumbing codes and household plumbing were advocated for; the intersection of advancements in technology and desire for cleanliness and disease-free spaces spurred the development of public toilets.

Facilities for women sometimes had a wider emphasis, providing a safe and comfortable private space in the public sphere. The Ladies Rest Room is one example of the non-euphemistic use of the term: literally, a place to rest. Historically such rooms pre-dated the washroom and washrooms were added afterwards. Subsequent integrated designs resulted in the "women's restroom lounge".

A notable early example of a public toilet in the United States is the Old School Privy. The American architect Frank Lloyd Wright claimed to have "invented the hung wall for the w.c. (easier to clean under)" when he designed the Larkin Administration Building in Buffalo, New York in 1904.

According to a 2021 study by QS Supplies, the United States has just 8 public toilets for every 100,000 people, a rate that ties the country with Botswana in terms of access to toilet facilities. In the 1970s there were 50,000 coin-operated public restrooms in the U.S., but they were eliminated by 1980, and public facilities did not replace them.

Across U.S. history, public bathrooms have intersected with contentious social issues and politics. Concerns have been raised about gay men, homeless people and drug users using public bathrooms. During the civil rights era, public officials faced with the choice of integrating public restrooms often ended up simply closing public restrooms. In recent years, there has been political controversy in the United States about the rights of trans individuals to public restrooms.

=== South Africa ===
During the apartheid years in South Africa, public toilets were usually segregated by race.

== Legislation ==
=== Mandatory requirements ===
In Brazil, there exists no federal law or regulation that makes public toilets provision compulsory. The lack of public toilets across Brazil results in frequent acts of public urination.

=== Sex separation ===
==== United States ====
Massachusetts passed the first law requiring sex separation of public toilets in 1887. By 1920, this was mandated in 43 states.

In jurisdictions using the Uniform Plumbing Code in the U.S., sex separation is a legal mandate via the building code.

=== Toilets for employees and customers ===
Various countries have legislation stipulating how many public toilets are required in a given area for employees or for customers.

==== United States ====
The Restroom Access Act is legislation several U.S. States passed that requires retail establishments with toilet facilities for employees to also allow customers to use the facilities if the customer suffers from an inflammatory bowel disease or other medical condition requiring immediate access to a toilet.

==== United Kingdom ====
In the United Kingdom, the Workplace (Health, Safety and Welfare) Regulations 1992 requires businesses to provide toilets for their employees, along with washing facilities including soap or other suitable means of cleaning. The Workplace (Health, Safety and Welfare) Approved Code of Practice and Guidance L24, available from Health and Safety Executive Books, outlines guidance on the number of toilets to provide and the type of washing facilities associated with them.

Local authorities are not legally required to provide public toilets, and while in 2008 the House of Commons Communities and Local Government Committee called for a duty on local authorities to develop a public toilet strategy, the Government rejected the proposal.

In 2022 the UK Government Equality Minister Kemi Badenoch announced plans to make provision of single-sex toilets compulsory in new public buildings above a certain size. The technical review consultation on increasing accessibility and provision of toilets for men and women in municipal and private sector locations outlined the context in a call for evidence to be submitted:

There needs to be proper provision of gender-specific toilets for both men and women, with a clear steer in building standards guidance. In recent years, there has been a trend towards the removal of well-established male-only/female-only spaces when premises are built or refurbished, and they have often been replaced with gender-neutral toilets. This places women at a significant disadvantage. While men can then use both cubicles and urinals, women can only use the former, and women also need safe spaces given their particular health and sanitary needs (for example, women who are menstruating, pregnant or at menopause, may need to use the toilet more often). Women are also likely to feel less comfortable using mixed sex facilities, and require more space.

== Equality of access ==
The presence or absence of public toilets has also long been a reflection of a society's class inequalities and social hierarchies.

In the UK the number of public toilets fell by nearly 20% from 3,154 in 2015/16 to 2,556 in 2020/21 This loss leads to health and mobility inequality issues for a range of people, including the homeless, disabled, outdoor workers and those whose illnesses mean that they frequently need to access a toilet. The decline of the great British public toilet is described by the Royal Society for Public Health as creating a “urinary leash” which restricts how far people can travel out from their homes.

=== Access for women ===
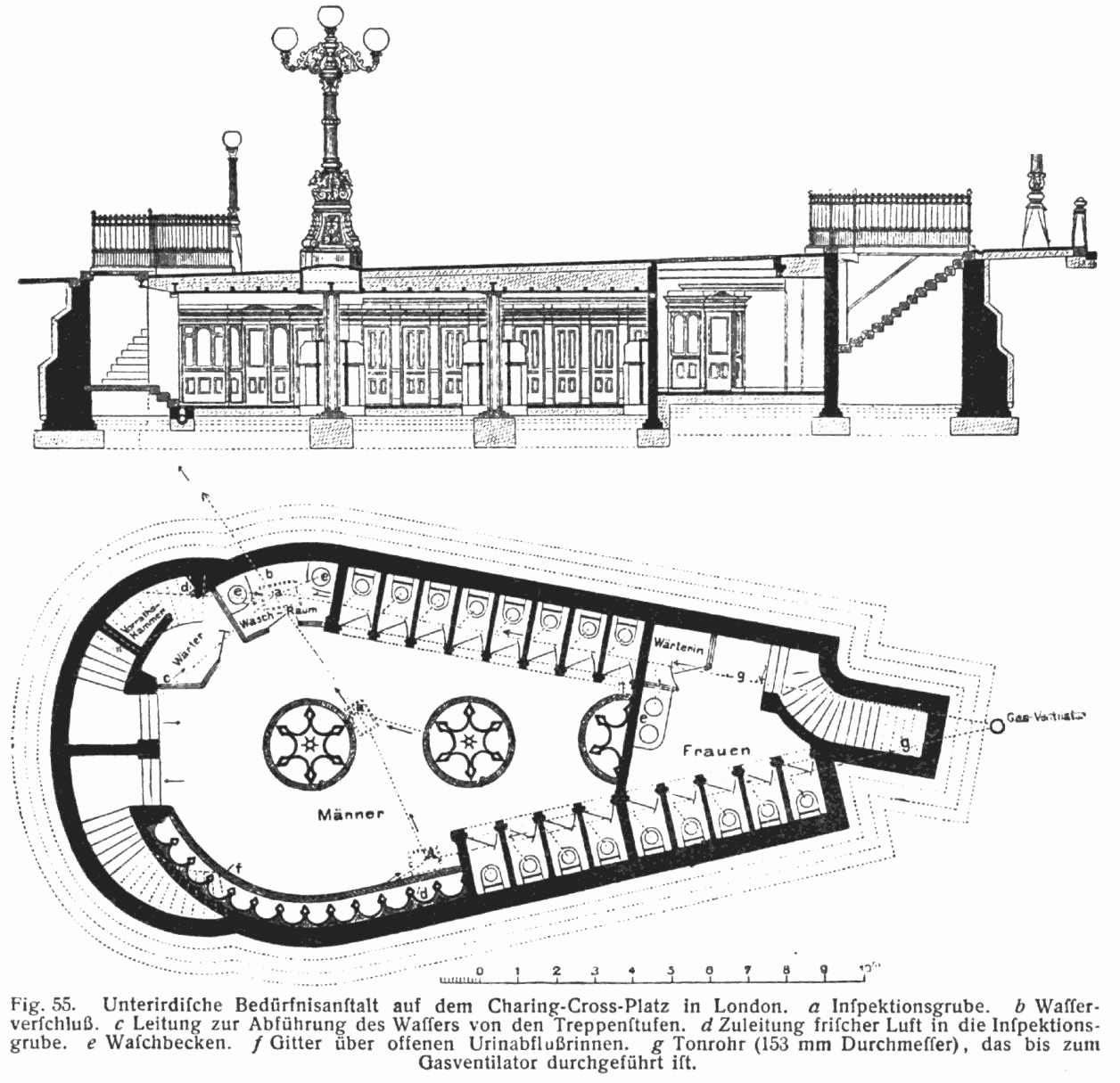
Section and plan of public toilets in Charing Cross Road, London, 1904. The male facilities (left) comprise 12 cubicles and 13 urinals, whereas the female facilities (right) comprise just 5 cubicles.

The lack of public toilets for women reflects their exclusion from the public sphere in the Victorian era. During this period, after leaving their parents' home, women were often expected to maintain careers as homemakers and wives. Thus, safe and private public toilets were rarely available for them. The result was that they were frequently restricted in how far they could travel away from home without returning. Alternatively, they had to make do in the public streets as best they could. They often experienced sexual harassment as men tried to "sneak a peek" or otherwise bothered them. Some women experienced even worse if they could not secure safety and privacy even at home or in their workplaces. These problems continue for women and girls of various identities in all parts of the world.

The practice of pay toilets emerged in the US in the late 19th century. In these spaces, public toilets could only be accessed by paying a fee. Sex-separated pay toilets were available at the Chicago World's Fair (US) in 1893. Women complained that these were practically unavailable to them; authorities allowed them to be free, but on Fridays only. In the twentieth century, activist groups in the U.S., including the Committee to End Pay Toilets in America, claimed that such practices disadvantaged women and girls because men and boys did not have to pay for urinals. As an act of protest against this phenomenon, in 1969 California Assemblywoman March Fong Eu destroyed a toilet on the steps of the California State Capitol. By the 1990s most US jurisdictions had migrated away from pay toilets. Until 1992, U.S. female senators had to use toilets located on different floor levels than the ones they were working on, a reflection of their segregation in a nearly all-male profession.

While some public facilities were available to women in London by 1890, there were many fewer than those available to men.

Toilets also were assigned strong moral overtones. While public water closets were considered necessary for sanitation reasons, they were viewed as offending public sensibilities. It has been said that because public facilities were associated with access to public spaces, extending these rights to women was viewed as "immoral" and an "abomination". As a result of Victorian era codes, women were delegated to the private sphere, away from the public, fulfilling their roles as wives and mothers where any association with sexuality or private body parts was taboo. For women, the female lavatory in a public space was associated with danger and immoral sexual conduct.

According to World Bank data from 2017, over 500 million women lacked access to sanitation facilities to go to the bathroom or manage menstrual hygiene. Risk of sexual assault is high, in India as high as 50%. Amnesty International includes training school staff in early intervention strategies to address harassment and violence, among its list of suggested measures to ensure the safety of women and girls in schools.

In many places the queues for the female toilets are longer than those for the male ones; efforts to deal with this are known as potty parity. Male bathrooms tend to have more toilets available. It has been estimated that females can take up to 50% longer in the toilet. The reasons given include the requirement to use a cubicle rather than a urinal, pregnancy, managing menstruation, health conditions (such as cystitis), clothing design, and helping others. Women are more likely to be accompanied by very young children, disabled, or older people.

=== Access for African-American people (racial segregation) ===
After slavery ended in the United States, southern states attempted to replicate social economic oppression by passing laws requiring that blacks and whites be separated in all public and private venues. Racial segregation included public toilets, mandated by Jim Crow laws prior to the Civil Rights Act of 1964. Justifications provided for segregated facilities included "protection of a certain group, privacy, cleanliness, and morality.” This segregation imposed significant restrictions on the lives of African Americans. Strategies to keep African Americans out of sight included the "basement solution," which involved locating public toilets for black people in the basement next to janitor supply rooms. Black workers often had to walk long distances to get to the toilets they were assigned.

Those who were able to afford cars could avoid the indignities of segregated trains and buses, but they faced the difficulty of finding a public toilet they were allowed to use. Courtland Milloy of the Washington Post recalled that on cross-country road trips in the 1950s his parents were reluctant to stop the car to allow the children to relieve themselves – it just was not safe. One solution to this was to carry a portable toilet (a sort of bucket-like arrangement) in the trunk of the car. This treatment led to the creation of The Negro Motorist Green Book, an annually updated guidebook. Once the traveler found the correct "colored restroom", it could serve "as a respite from the insults of the white world", akin to what is now called safe space.

Following the 1941 executive order which prohibited “discrimination in the employment of workers in defence industries or government,” white women refused to share bathrooms with black women throughout the South. Engaging in numerous labor strikes and walkouts against Fair Employment Practice Committee politics, they erroneously claimed that racial integration would cause them to catch syphilis from toilet seats. Similar arguments equating equal access to restrooms with contracting venereal diseases were made by white women after the 1954 court ruling against segregated public schools which led to the desegregation of Little Rock Central High School.

Samuel Younge Jr., then a student at Tuskegee Institute, was murdered in 1966 after trying to use a "whites-only" restroom. He was the first black college student to be killed for his actions supporting the Civil Rights Movement.

=== Access for people with disabilities ===
Public toilets have frequently been inaccessible to people with disabilities. In the United States, all public toilets in federal buildings were required to be accessible to people with disabilities by the Architectural Barriers Act of 1968. These requirements were extended to all public buildings by the Americans with Disabilities Act of 1990.

=== Access for transgender and gender non-conforming people ===
Access to public toilets for transgender and gender non-conforming people, or efforts to make bathrooms accessible for all people, are often contested. In the United States, various bathroom bills have been put forward to define who can have public toilet access, and on what terms. Many of these bills seek to criminalize usage by people whose gender identity does not match the sex on their birth certificates.

A variety of motives have been put forward for these bills, such as assuming that it protects the privacy of other women, avoidance of retraumatization in women affected by male violence, and to protect women from being assaulted by what they consider to be men donning disguises, although there is no evidence of the latter ever having occurred in the past. The UK's Equality and Human Rights Commission published guidance in 2022 outlining scenarios where it considered discrimination and segregation of transgender people from single-sex spaces to be justifiable and proportionate. While transgender public toilet usage has been labelled as a moral panic, the ongoing polarising discourse continues to have significant negative impacts on this group.

== Health aspects ==
=== Health problems from lack of public toilets ===
Public toilets play a role in community health and individual well-being. Where toilets are available, people can enjoy outings and physical activities in their communities. By letting people get out of their cars and onto their feet, bicycles and mass transit, public toilets can contribute to improved environmental health. Mental well-being is enhanced when people are out with families and friends and know a place "to go" is available.

Public toilets also serve people who are "toilet challenged". First, some people need to go very frequently, including young and old people, people who are pregnant or menstruating, and those with some medical conditions. Second, some people need toilet access urgently, suddenly and without warning: such as those with chronic conditions such as Crohn's disease and colitis, and those temporarily afflicted with food-borne illnesses.

The inability to satisfy essential physiological needs because no toilet is available contributes to health issues such as urinary tract infections, kidney infections, and digestive problems, which can later develop into severe health problems. Inadequate access to a public toilets when required can lead to substantial problems for people with prostate problems, people who are menstruating or going through the menopause, and people with urinary and fecal incontinence.

A 2015 study by the National Center for Transgender Equality found that 8% of transgender Americans reported having developed urinary tract infections, kidney infections, and other kidney-related problems as a result of avoiding, or not being granted access to, the facilities. In another survey, the group DC Trans Coalition found that 54% of its respondents (located in Washington, DC) reported physical problems from avoiding using public toilets, such as dehydration, kidney infections, and urinary tract infections.

According to the Government of Australia, more than 3.8 million Australians of all ages are estimated to suffer continence issues. This represents 18% of the Australian population. Therefore, the Department of Health and Ageing maintains the National Public Toilet Map to enable the public to find the closest facility.

In the United States, workers have legal rights to access a toilet during their work day. The U.S. Department of Labor's Occupational Health and Safety protects workers' rights to toilet breaks because of the documented health risks. This protected right to a toilet is a function of the workplace and is lost when workers leave the workplace.

If bus and truck drivers on timed schedules have difficulty in accessing toilets, this puts them at risk of bladder and digestive health problems. Furthermore, if the concentration of a driver in urgent need is compromised, it becomes a broader public safety concern.

== Design ==
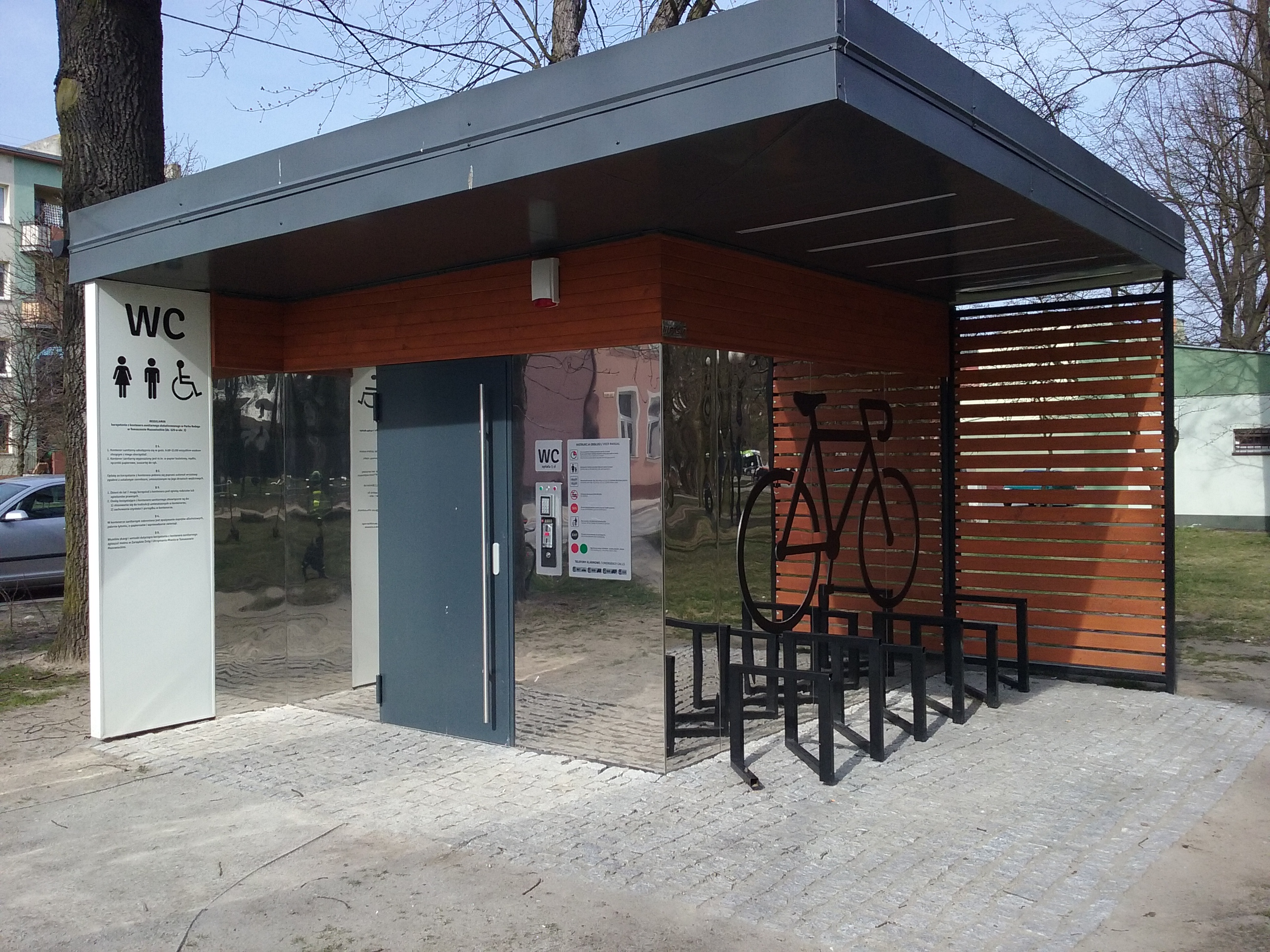
Public toilet in city park in Tomaszów Mazowiecki, Poland

=== Entry ===
==== Doorless entry ====
Modern public toilets may be designed with a labyrinth entrance (doorless entry), which prevents the spread of disease that might otherwise occur when coming in contact with a door. Doorless entry provides visual privacy while simultaneously offering a measure of security by allowing the passage of sound. Doorless entry also helps deter vandalism; fewer audible clues to another person entering discourages some vandals. Doorless entry may also be achieved simply by keeping an existing door propped open, closed only when necessary.

==== Coin operated entry ====
Pay toilets usually have some form of coin operated turnstile, or they have an attendant who collects the fee.

=== Privacy ===
People often expect a high level of privacy when using public toilets. Privacy expectations may include toilet cubicles, cubicle doors, urinal partitions and similar.

The World Health Organization states that toilets should be "suitable, private and safe to use for all intended users, taking into consideration their gender, age and physical mobility (e.g. disabled, sick etc.)" and "All shared or public toilets should have [...] doors that can be locked from the inside, and lights".

=== Service access ===
Modern public toilets often have a service entrance, utilities passage, and the like, that run behind all the fixtures. Sensors are installed in a separate room, behind the fixtures. Usually, the separate room is just a narrow corridor or passageway.

=== Sensors ===
Sensor-operated fixtures (faucets, soap dispensers, hand dryers, paper towel dispensers) prevent the spread of disease by allowing patrons to circumvent the need to touch common surfaces. Sensor-operated toilets also help conserve water by limiting the amount used per flush, and require less routine maintenance. Each sensor views through a small window into each fixture. Sometimes the metal plates that house the sensor windows are bolted on from behind, to prevent tampering. Additionally, all of the electrical equipment is safely behind the walls, so that there is no danger of electric shock. However, a residual-current device must be used for all such electrical equipment.

Some public toilets have an automatic sensor-controlled flushing system that flushes the toilet when the user steps away from the sensor. They might also have an additional button that the user can push to provide a second flush.

=== Urinals ===
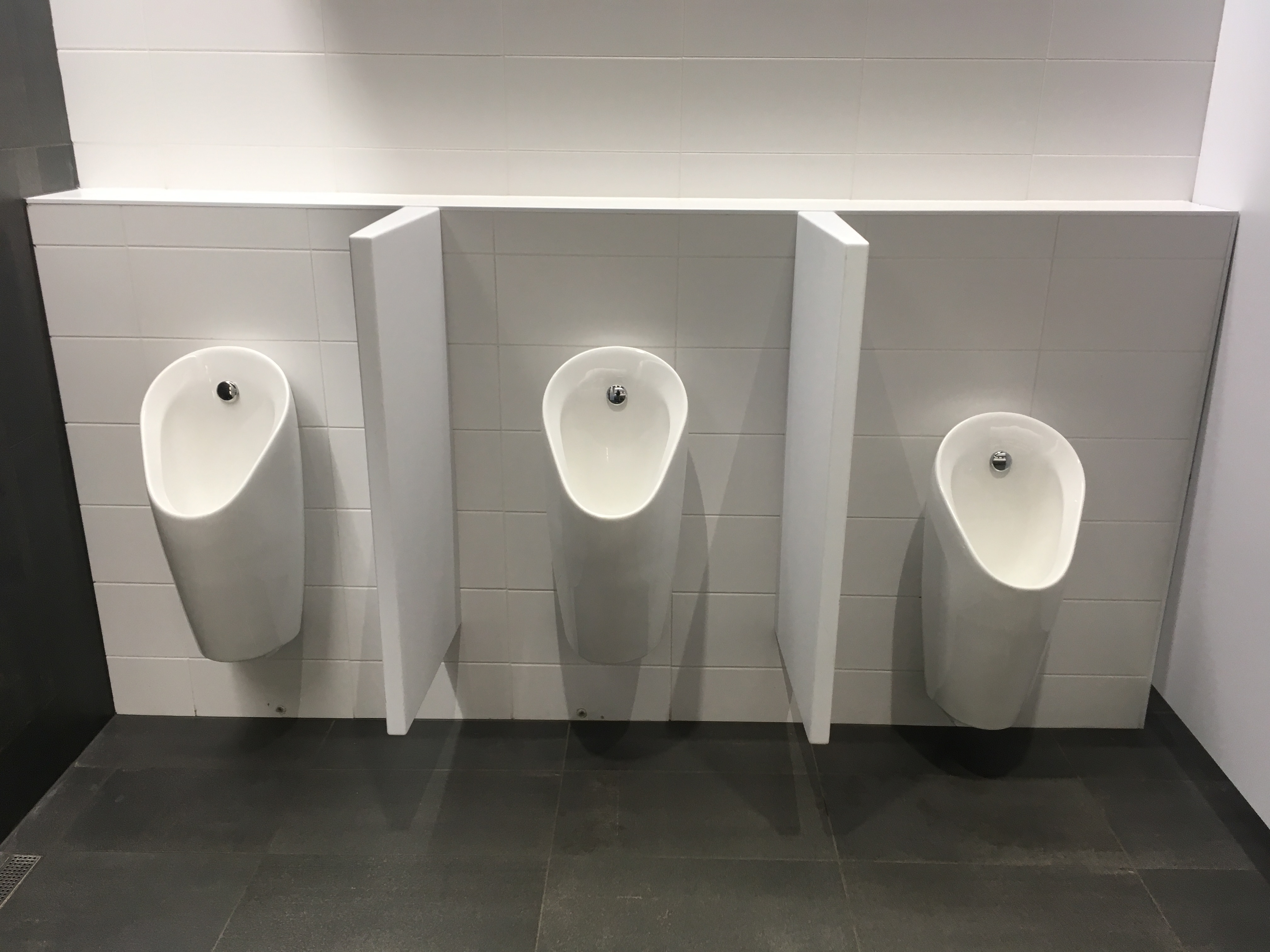
Male urinals with partitions

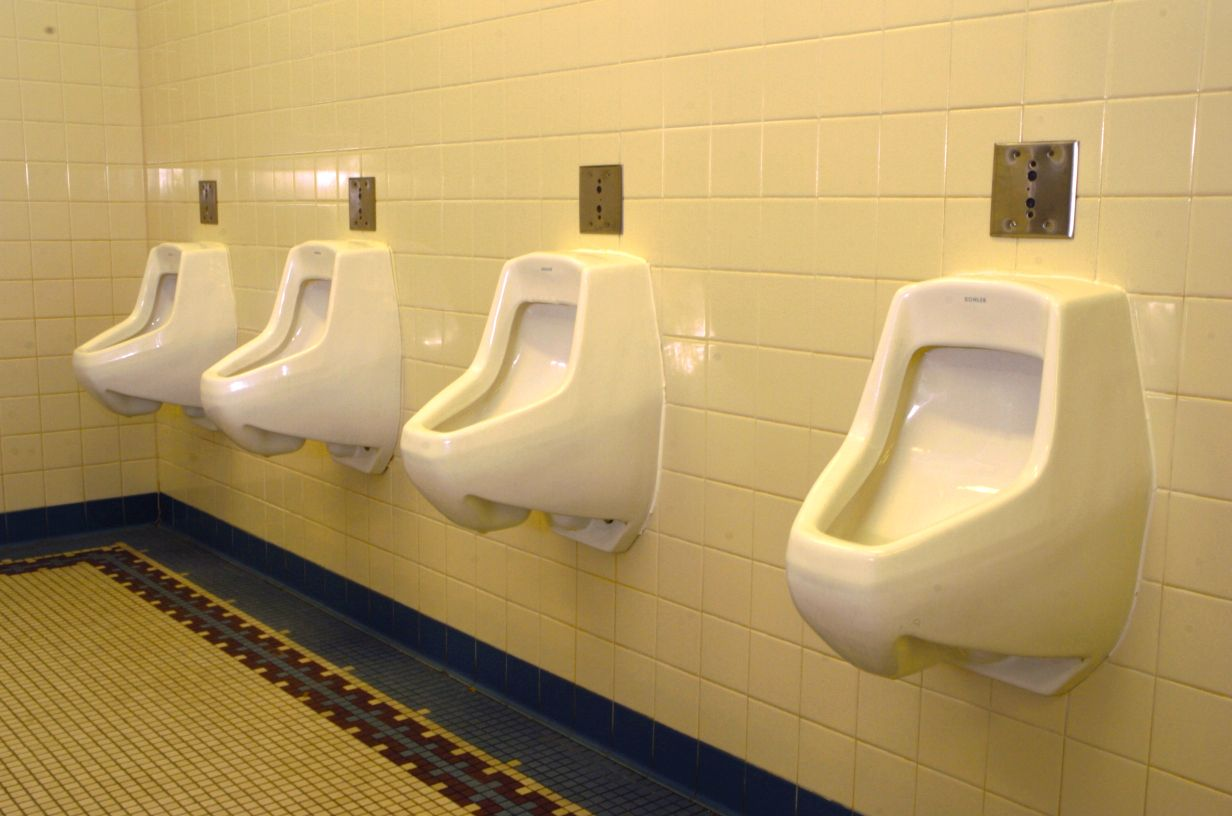
Male urinals without partitions

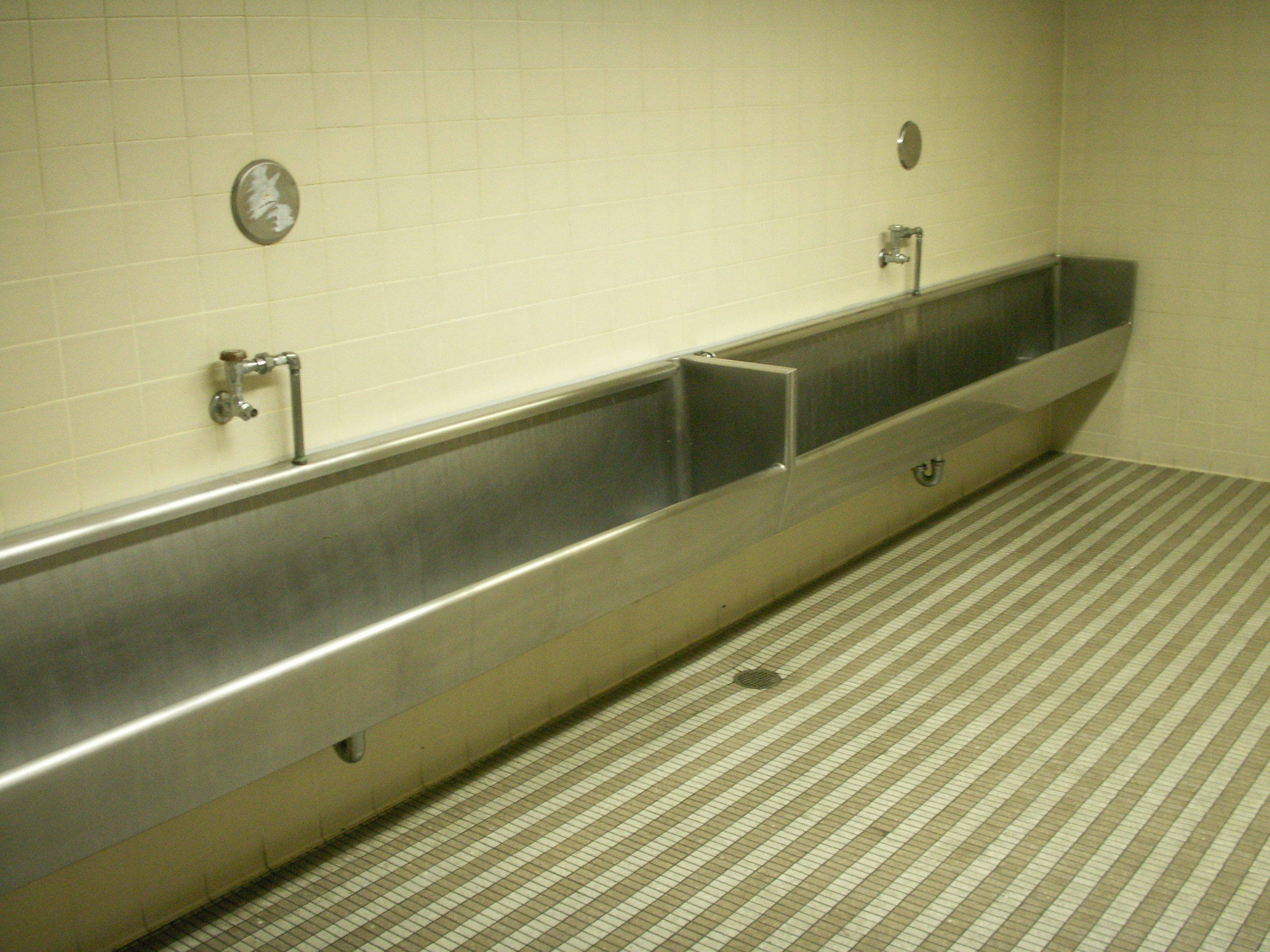
A trough urinal in a male public restroom

Urinals for males are common in public toilets as they are more space efficient than toilets (for urination). Urinals in public toilets are common in Western countries but less so in Muslim countries, partly due to Islamic toilet etiquette rules. Urinals for females exist but are rare. Urinals can be with automatic or manual flushing, or without flush water as is the case for waterless urinals. They can be arranged as single sanitary fixtures (with or without privacy walls) or in a trough design without privacy walls. The body posture for users of urinals is specifically the standing position. Compared with urination in a general-purpose toilet, usage is faster and more sanitary because at the urinal there are no fecal germs, no additional doors or locks to touch, and no seat to turn up. A urinal takes less space, is simpler, and consumes less water per flush (or even no water at all) than a flush toilet. Urinal setups can have individual urinals (with or without privacy partitions) or a communal urinal (also called a trough urinal) which is used by multiple men.

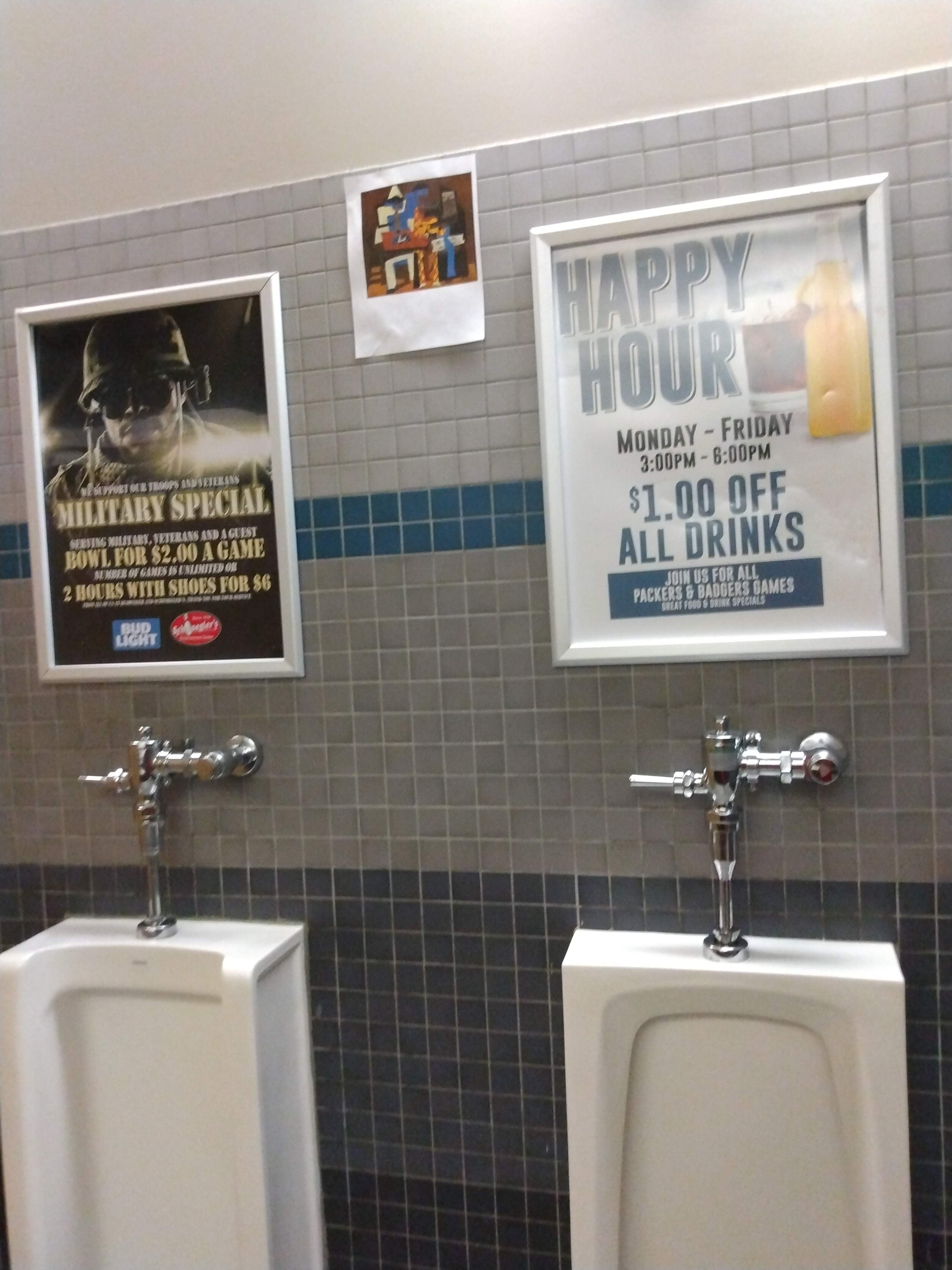
A set of advertisements above a row of urinals

=== Lighting ===
Service lighting consisting of windows that run all the way around the outside of the toilet using electric lights behind the windows, to create the illusion of extensive natural light, even when the toilets are underground or otherwise do not have access to natural light. The windows are sometimes made of glass brick, permanently cemented in place. Lighting installed in service tunnels that run around the outside of the toilets provides optimum safety from electrical shock (keeping the lights outside the toilet), hygiene (no cracks or openings), security (no way for vandals to access the light bulbs), and aesthetics (clean architectural lines that maintain a continuity of whatever aesthetic design is present, e.g., the raw industrial urban aesthetic that works well with glass brick).

=== Cisterns (tanks) ===
Older toilets infrequently have service ducts, and often in old toilets that have been modernized, the toilet cistern is hidden in a tiled over purpose-built 'box'. Often old toilets still have high-level cisterns in the service ducts. On the outside, the toilet is flushed by a handle (just like an ordinary low-level cistern toilet) although behind the wall this handle activates a chain. Sometimes a long flushing trough is used to allow closets to be flushed repeatedly without waiting for the cistern to refill. This trend of hiding cisterns and fittings behind the walls started in the late 1930s in the United States and in the United Kingdom from the 1950s, and by the late 1960s it was unusual for toilet cisterns to be visible in public toilets. In some buildings such as schools, however, a cistern can still be visible, although high-level cisterns had become outdated by the 1970s. Many schools now have low-level cisterns.

=== Hand drying options ===
An option for hand drying is usually provided next to the sink. This can be either a paper towel dispenser (sometimes they have auto-sensors for touchless dispensing) or a mechanical hand dryer (used manually or with auto-sensors). Drying of washed hands is important for convenience but also because wet hands are more easily recontaminated. Paper towels are more hygienic than electric air dryers.

=== Other fixtures ===
Public toilets by their nature see heavy usage. Some high-vandalism settings, such as beaches or stadiums, will use metal toilets. Public toilets generally contain several of the following fixtures.

==== In the lockable cubicle (stall) ====
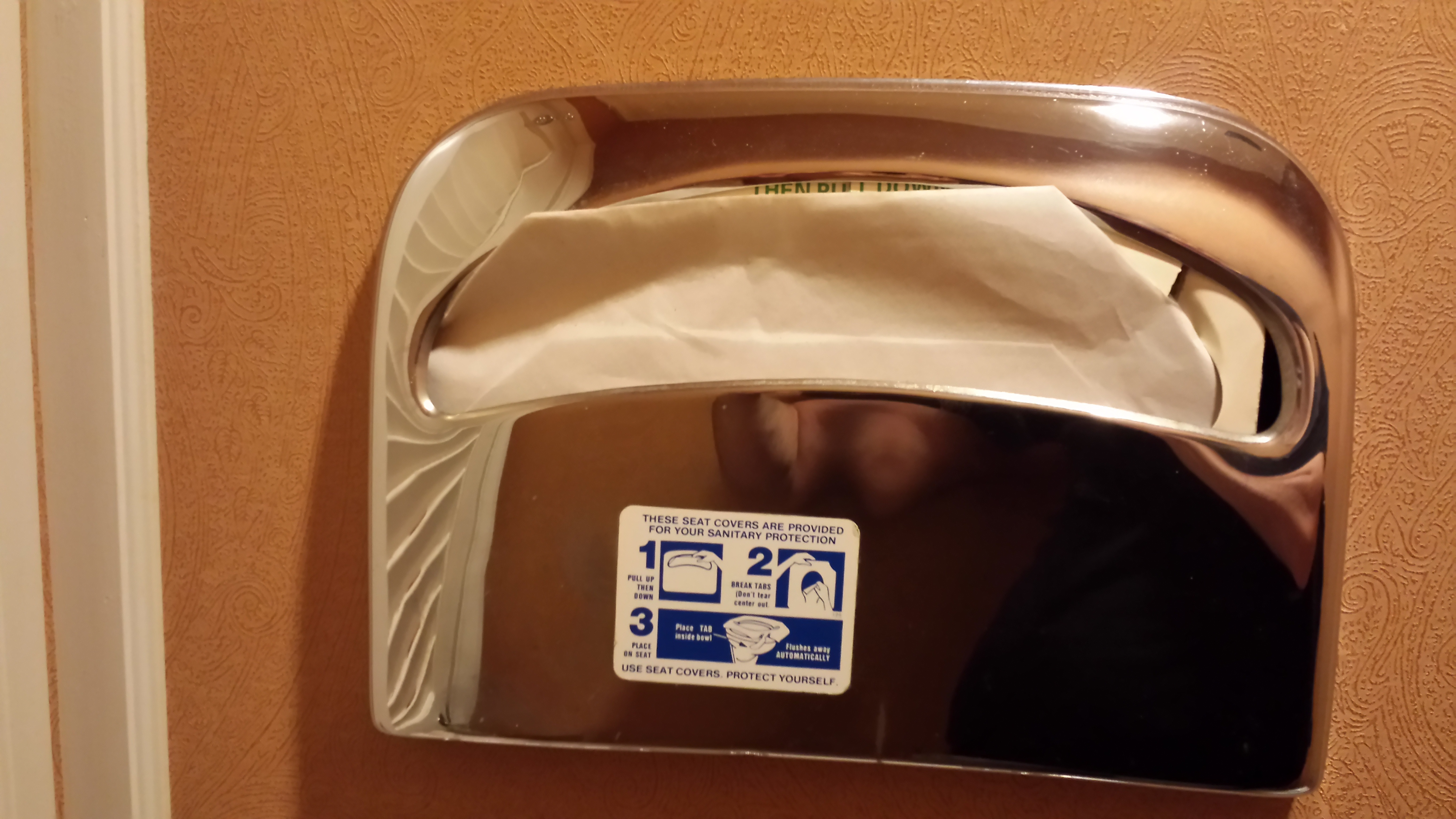
A dispenser of toilet seat covers

- Toilet cubicle door
- Toilet with toilet seat; whereas a home toilet seat has a lid, a public toilet may or may not, and may not even have a seat
- Toilet paper, often within a lockable dispenser
- Coat hook
- "Pull-down" purse holder
- sanitary protection bin for menstrual products; this may be classified as clinical waste and be subject to special regulations concerning disposal
- Dispenser for flushable paper toilet seat covers
- Toilet cubicle door lock sign. The toilet cubicle door lock signs are indicated in either colour: Vacant is marked in green, while Engaged is marked in red

==== At the point of handwashing ====
- Faucets (taps); some are at a lower level for children and wheelchair users
- Antiseptic hand-wash dispenser or soap dispensers, pump bottles or auto dispensers (not commonly supplied)
- Mirror (usually over sinks)
- Waste container / rubbish bin

==== Elsewhere ====
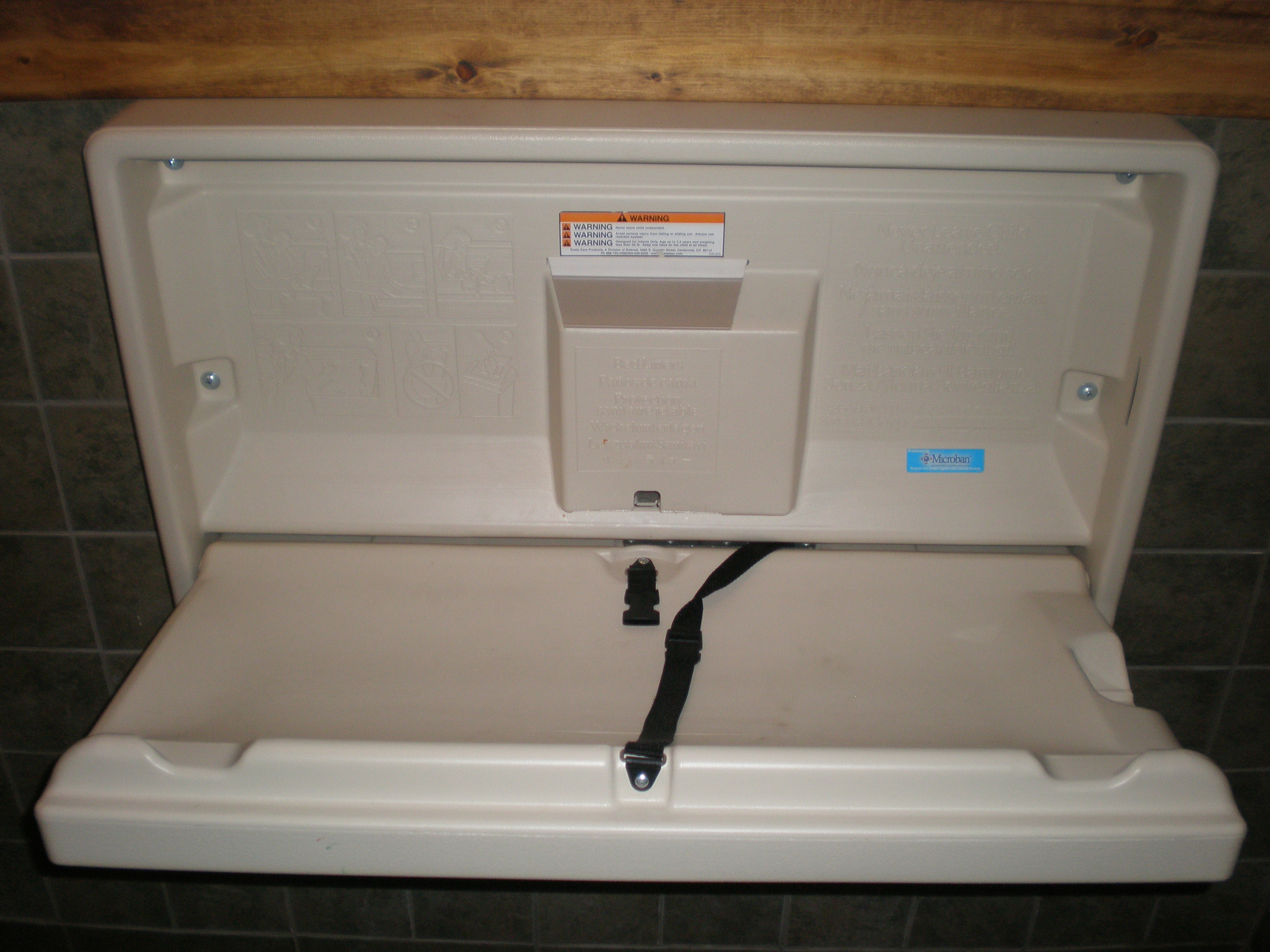
A foldable changing table, open

- Urinals (almost exclusively in public toilets for males; although see female urinal)
- Vending machines dispensing condoms, diapers (nappies), painkillers, energy drinks, perfume, breath mints, facial tissue, confectionery, undergarments, swimwear, soap, sex toys, or sanitary napkins or tampons
- Air fresheners or odour control systems
- Infant changing table, often fold-down (usually in women's rooms, but increasingly also in men's rooms). They are sometimes placed within a, usually large, toilet cubicle.
- Sometimes showers are also present, often with soap, shampoo, or similar dispensers (often at truck stops)

== Cleaning, maintenance and management ==
Thorough cleaning and maintenance are important for public toilets. This task is usually performed by a "public toilet attendant" (who is there during an entire shift) or by professional cleaning staff. They maintain and clean the facilities, ensuring that toilet paper, soap, paper towels, and other necessary items are kept stocked.

Public toilets need both periodic maintenance and emergency cleaning. Volunteer-managed facilities may also be an option in some cases.

There are now durable options for restroom stall materials such as solid plastic that were designed to help fight vandalism. Solid plastic allows for scratches to be less noticeable due to the solid color throughout the product compared to powder coated steel. Powder coated steel chips easily lead to obvious damage compared with solid plastic. Solid plastic is also easier to clean and maintain in public restrooms with high traffic volumes.

== Costs and economics ==
=== User fees ===
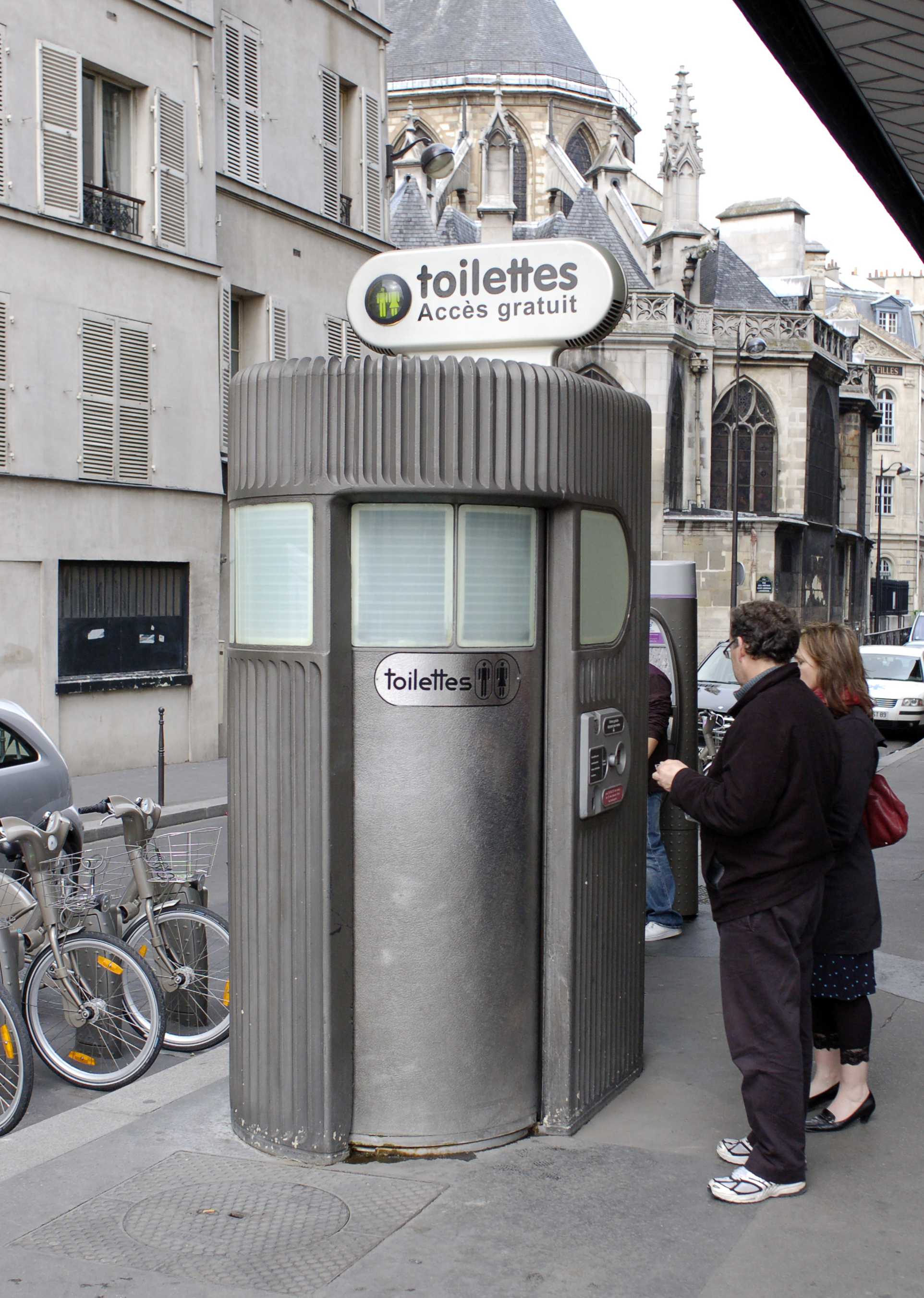
A Sanisette, a freestanding, free toilet stall in Paris (formerly coin-operated)

Toilets that require the user to pay may be street furniture or be inside a building, e.g. a shopping mall, department store, or railway station. The reason for charging money is usually for the maintenance of the equipment. Paying to use a toilet can be traced back almost 2,000 years—the Roman emperor Vespasian is believed to have begun charging his citizens to use toilet facilities c. 74 AD. The payment may be taken by a bathroom attendant, or by a coin-operated turnstile or cubicle door. (see John Nevil Maskelyne, who invented a door lock requiring the insertion of a penny coin, hence the euphemism to "spend a penny") The first pay toilet in the United States was installed in 1910 in Terre Haute, Indiana.

=== Privatization and closures ===
In some places, the provision of public toilet facilities is under great pressure. One response by public authorities is to close the buildings, often citing criminal activity. The United Kingdom government austerity programme has led to major council cut-backs to public toilet provision, with knock-on effects on the public realm as a whole. Some of the buildings, particularly the underground ones, are sold and used for other purposes, e.g. as a bar.

Another response is to privatise the toilets, so that a public good is provided by a contractor, just as private prisons are. The toilets may fall under the category of privately owned public space - anyone can use them, but the land ultimately belongs to the corporation in question. When toilets that have been privatised are improperly run, or closed, there may be calls to take them back into the control of the public authority.

== Society and culture ==
=== Unisex (gender-neutral) ===
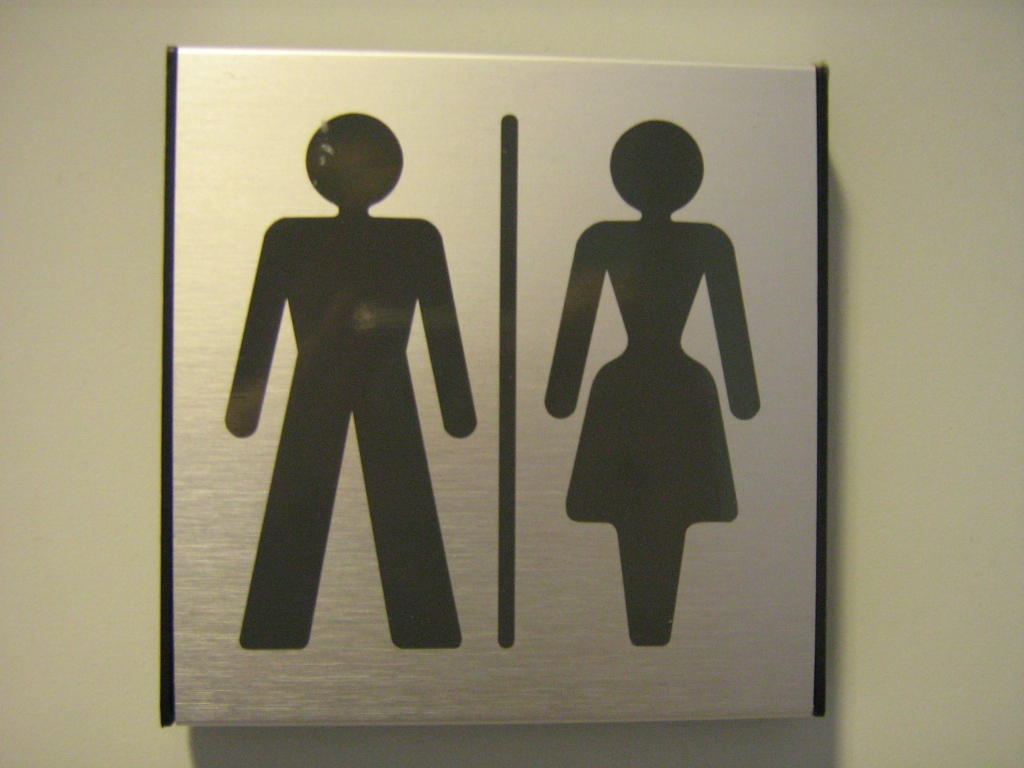
Gender-neutral toilet sign at department of sociology, University of Gothenburg, Gothenburg, Sweden

Public toilets are often separated by sex. In many cultures, this separation is so characteristic that a pictogram of a man or a woman often suffices to indicate the facility, without explicit reference to the fixtures themselves. In restaurants and other private locations, the identifications can be designed to match the decoration of the premises. Toilet facilities for people with disabilities, especially those reliant on a wheelchair, may be either gender-specific or unisex. Gender-neutral toilets are usual in cases where sex-separated ones are not practical, such as in aircraft lavatories and passenger train toilets.

In the 21st century, with support from the transgender rights movement, some initiatives have called for gender-neutral public toilets, also called unisex public toilets (also called gender-inclusive, or all-gender). These may be instead of, or in addition to, gendered toilets, depending on the circumstances. Many groups are re-imagining what public toilets can look like; for instance, architect Joel Sanders, transgender historian Susan Stryker, and legal scholar Terry Kogan launched Stalled!, an open-source website which offers lectures, workshops, and design guidelines for unisex public toilets.

In addition to accommodating transgender and gender non-conforming individuals, gender-neutral public toilets facilitate usage for people who may require assistance from a caretaker of another gender, such as people with disabilities, elderly people, and children.

An additional consideration with regard to gendered public restrooms is the availability of baby changing tables. Sometimes, these tables have only been installed in women's restrooms, owing to stereotypical assumptions that only women were likely to be accompanied by babies needing to have their diapers changed. This can be an impediment for fathers with their children and other male caregivers. Advocates have worked for changing tables to be installed in men's restrooms. Unisex washrooms would provide access to either regardless.

=== Graffiti and street art ===
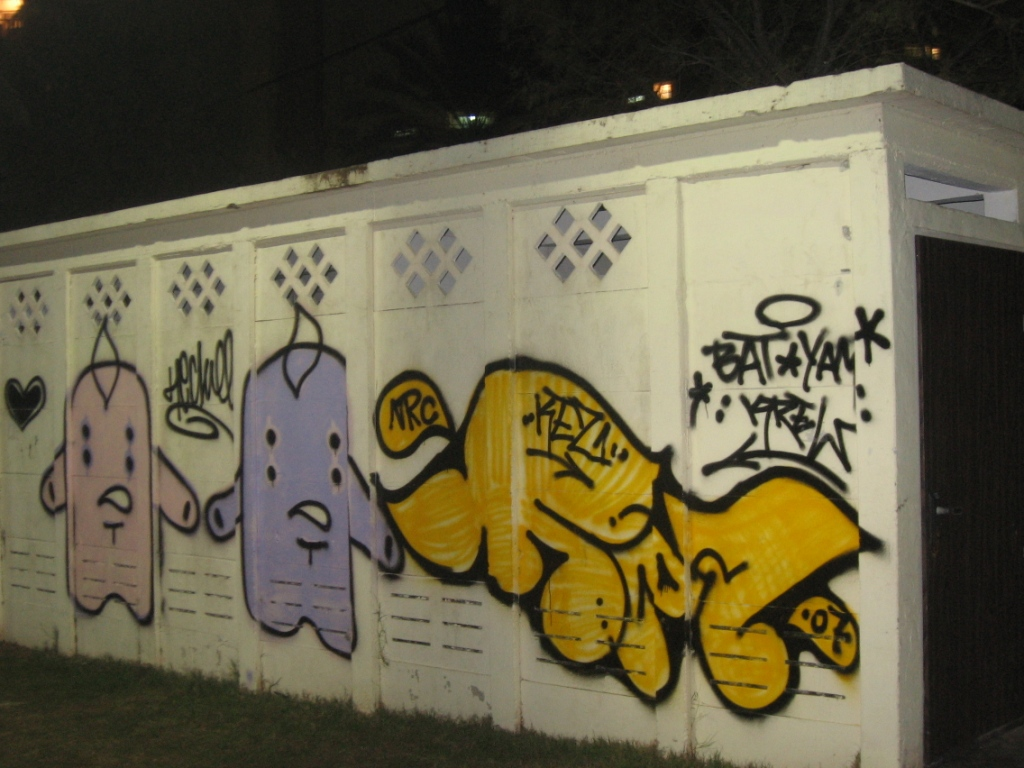
Graffiti at a toilet in Bat Yam, Israel

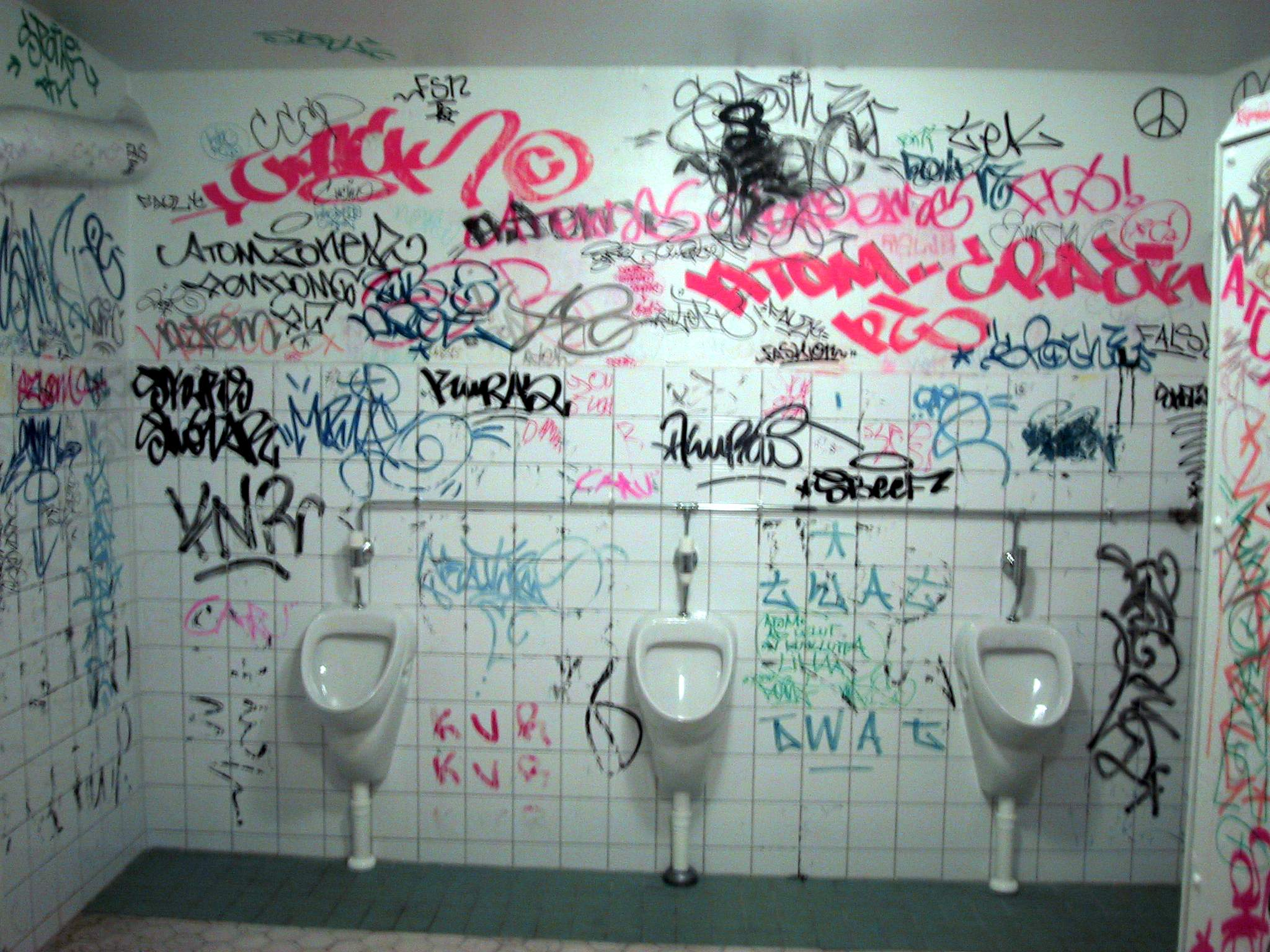
Graffiti at Meilahti Yläaste, Helsinki, Finland, 2006

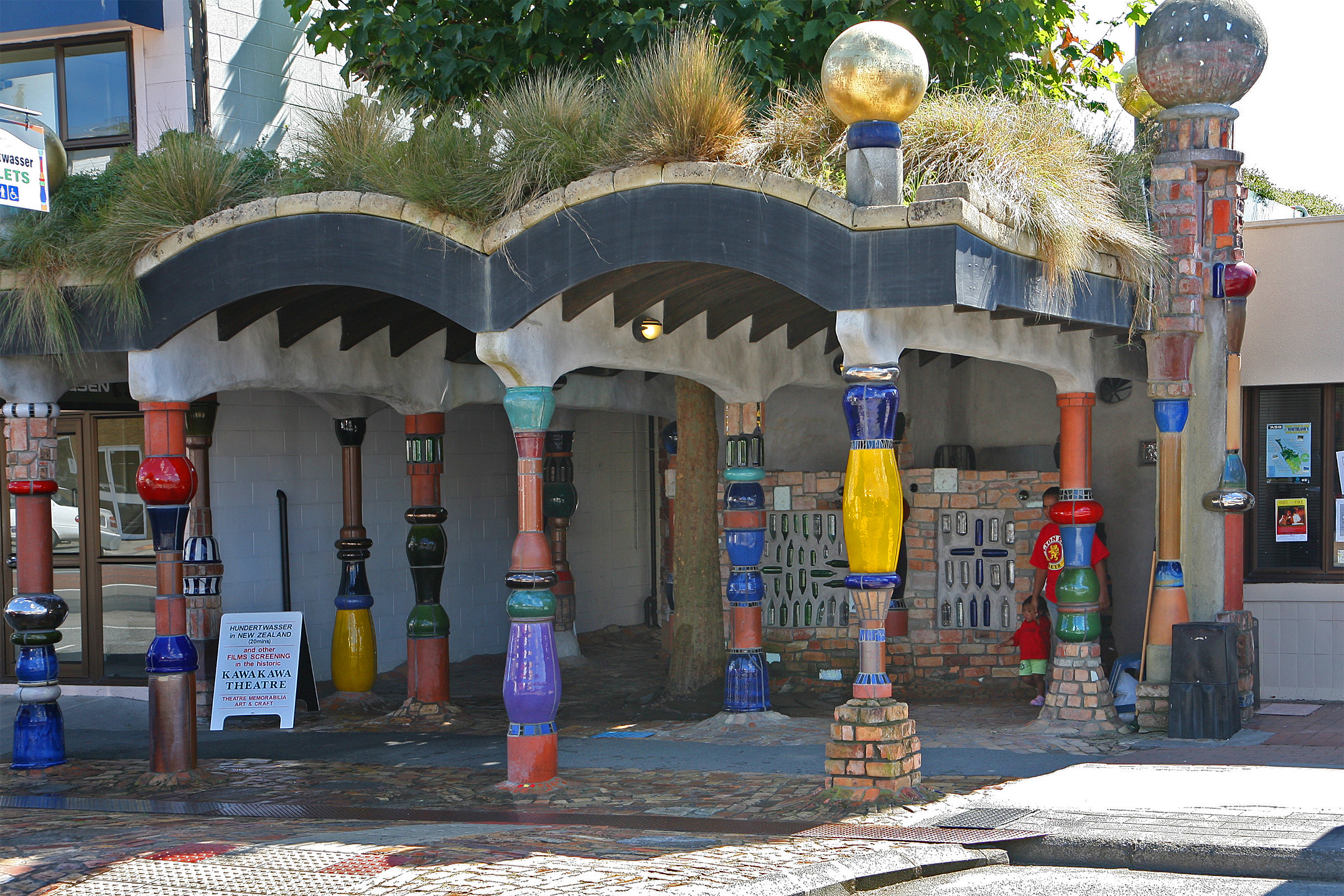
The Hundertwasser Toilets, seen as a tourist attraction in their own right

Public toilets have long been associated with graffiti, often of a transgressive, gossipy, or low-brow humorous nature (cf. toilet humour). The word latrinalia—from latrine (toilet) and -alia (a collection)—was coined to describe this kind of graffiti. A famous example of such artwork was featured on the album cover of the satirical Tony Award Broadway musical Urinetown, using felt-tip pen scribblings.

As graffiti merged into street art, so some public street-level toilets began to make a feature of their visibility. The Hundertwasser toilet block is a colourful example in Kawakawa, New Zealand, designed by an Austrian artist and viewed as a tourist draw in a small town.

=== Drugs, vandalism and violent crime ===
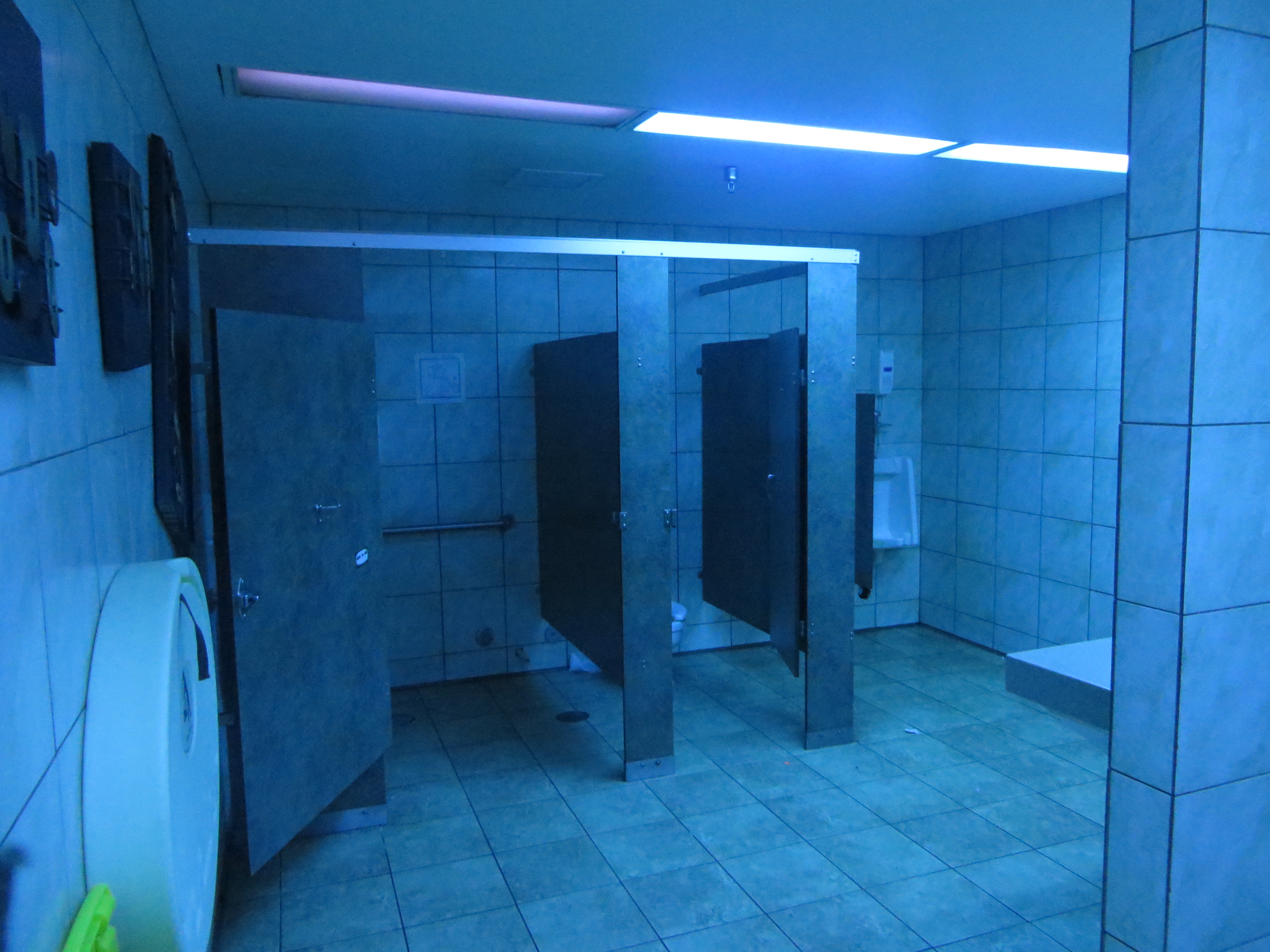
Anti–heroin-use public toilet in the U.S. This toilet for supermarket customers uses very dim, blue lighting to deter heroin users from injecting. The blue gloom makes veins impossible to see.

Some public toilets are known for drug-taking and drug-selling, as well as vandalism. This type of criminal activity is associated with all "neglected, unsupervised buildings", not just toilets, and good cleanliness and maintenance, and ideally an attendant on the premises, can act as a protection against these problems.

Violent crime inside public toilets can be a problem in areas where the rate of such crimes in general is very high. In South Africa, for instance, many people have reported being afraid to use public toilets. There have been several highly publicized murders in public toilets, such as the Seocho-dong public toilet murder case in South Korea in 2016. In the US, an infamous case was the murder of a 9-year-old boy in 1998 in a San Diego county public toilet.

Increasing public toilet provision can help to protect women from violent attacks. Research studies have found increased risk of women and girls being raped where there is limited or no access to safe toilets at night.

Several billion people lack access to improved water and sanitation and must travel long distances or wait until nighttime to defecate under cover of darkness. Women and girls managing menstruation increases their water and sanitation requirements for several days each month. Amongst the UN sustainable development goals, there is specific reference to achieving access to adequate and equitable sanitation and hygiene for all, paying special attention to the needs of women and girls in vulnerable situations (indicator 6.2).

A study conducted by the UCLA School of Law's Williams Institute found no significant change in the number of crimes since the passage of various laws that enable transgender public toilet usage. Transgender and gender non-conforming people are at risk of violence when using the public toilet (see: trans bashing). A 2015 study by the National Center for Transgender Equality found that 59% of transgender Americans avoided using public facilities for fear of confrontation. This landmark study, which included 27,715 respondents, found that 24% of respondents had their presence in the restroom questioned, 12% had experienced verbal harassment, physical assault, or sexual assault when attempting to use the restroom, and 9% were denied access entirely. Several studies have found that preventing transgender people from using public toilets has negative mental health impacts, leading to a higher risk of suicide.

=== Anonymous sex ===
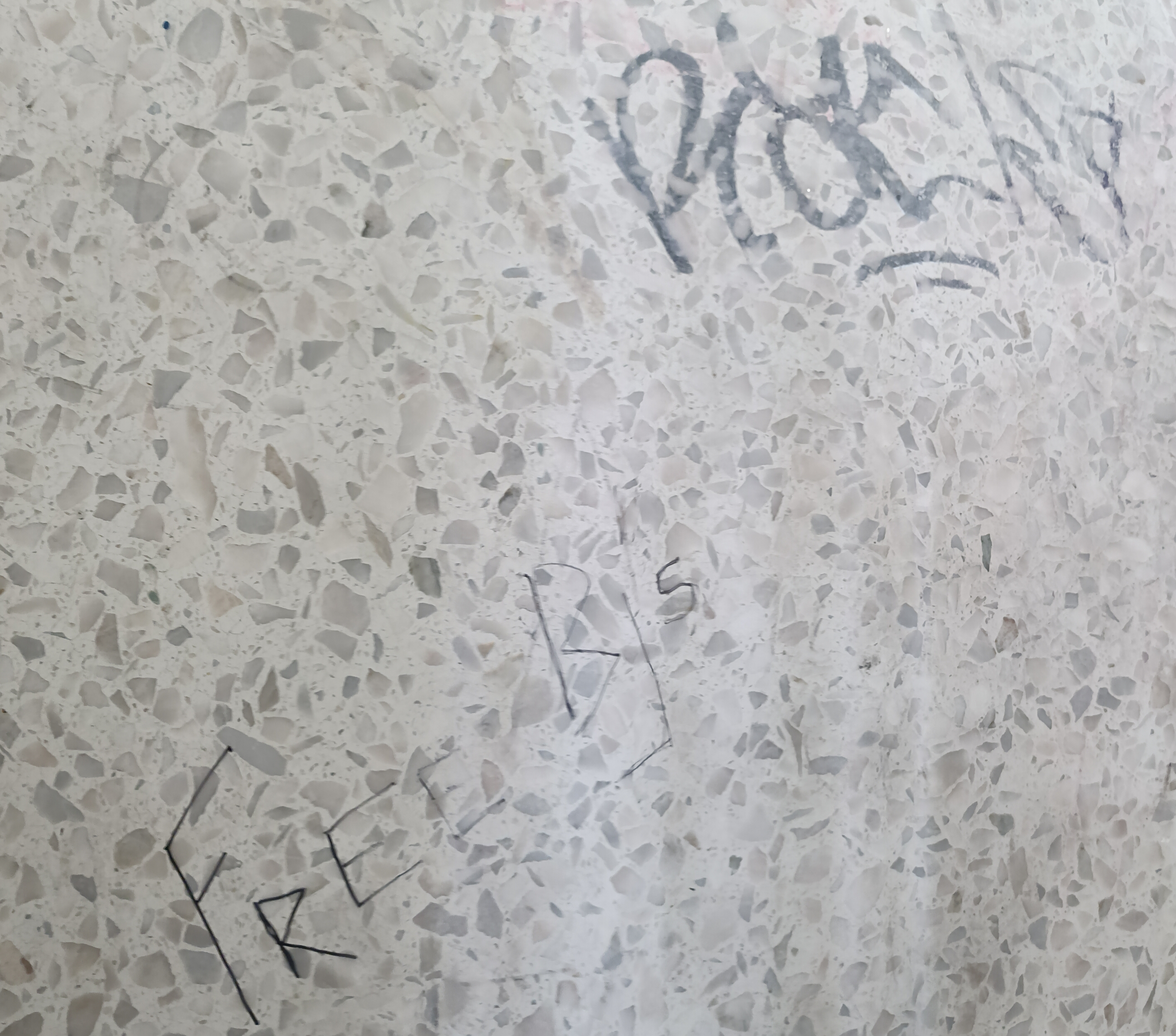
Graffiti on the side of a cubicle in a male toilet. Sydney, Australia 2024.

Before the gay liberation movement, public toilets were amongst the few places where men too young to enter gay bars legally could meet others who they knew with certainty to be gay. Many, if not most, gay and bisexual men at the time were closeted, and almost no public gay social groups were available for those under legal drinking age. The privacy and anonymity public toilets provided made them a convenient and attractive location to engage in sexual acts then.

Sexual acts in public toilets are outlawed in many jurisdictions (e.g. the Sexual Offences Act 2003 in the UK). It is likely that the element of risk involved in cottaging makes it an attractive activity to some.

=== Symbols in unicode ===
Unicode provides several symbols for public toilets.

Symbol	Code	Name	Value	Image
🚹	U+1F6B9	MENS SYMBOL	men's toilet	
🚺	U+1F6BA	WOMENS SYMBOL	women's toilet	
🚻	U+1F6BB	RESTROOM	public toilet or unisex public toilet	
🚼	U+1F6BC	BABY SYMBOL	baby changing station	
♿	U+267F	WHEELCHAIR SYMBOL	disabled accessible facilities	Disabled access
🚽	U+1F6BD	TOILET	public toilet	

== Toilets in particular locations ==
=== Shopping centres ===
Customers often expect retail stores and shopping centres to offer public toilets. Customers rank complimentary toilets highly, and their availability influences shopping behaviour. By offering appropriate customer toilets, retail stores and shopping centres may enhance their profits and image; however, many retailers pay insufficient attention to their customer toilet facilities. Due to the potential of customer toilets to increase profits and improve store image, retailers could benefit from regarding toilets as a marketing investment rather than a property expense. Some businesses, like Starbucks, have officially opted to let anyone use their toilets, without having to purchase anything. This decision was made after a highly publicized instance of racial profiling.

=== Schools ===
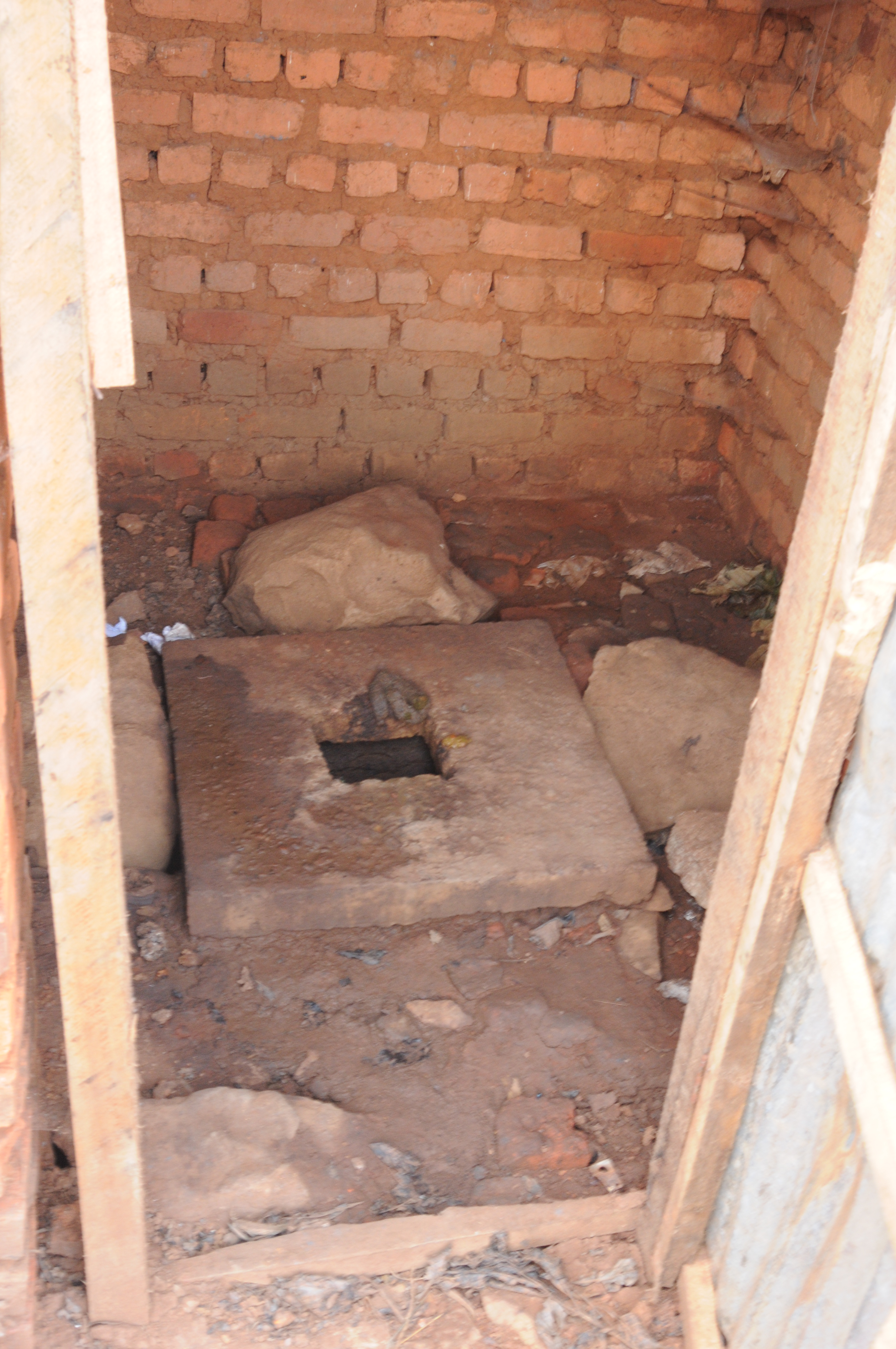
School toilet in Burundi

Lack of adequate school toilets is a very serious problem in many developing countries, and contributes to many problems from poor child health to school dropouts. Many pit latrines are not adequately built for young children, which has resulted in the tragic consequence of children dying by falling inside the hole. Globally, about 620 million children do not have adequate toilets at school, around 900 million cannot wash their hands properly, and almost half of schools do not provide soap.

The situation of inadequate school toilets violates children's right to education and right to water and sanitation. Such situations are common in many parts of the world, especially in Africa and South Asia, but also in other regions. For example, in the Caucasus and Central Asia, 30% of schools do not provide adequate toilets and 37% of schools do not have access to adequate water supplies. The presence of soap and toilet paper is very important, but is largely non-existent in many regions. Missing or inadequate doors and partitioning are observed in both high- and low-income countries, which can affect children's self-esteem, especially around puberty; in the case of girls, lack of menstrual hygiene management and privacy (such as the availability of functional toilet doors with locks, disposal facilities and menstrual hygiene products in schools, soap and toilet paper) can severely impact upon their well-being and is considered a form of violation of girls' rights.

In Japan, there is still squat toilets in most schools, which most Japanese children are not able to use or find it uncomfortable, which causes constipation.

The Bill & Melinda Gates Foundation has funded several research projects for provision of community, shared or school toilets in developing countries since 2011, when they launched their "Reinvent the Toilet Challenge".

=== Prisons ===
It is today accepted in the countries of the Council of Europe that a lack of basic privacy is a violation of fundamental rights. For example, the European Court of Human Rights ruled in Szafrański v. Poland (2015) that the forcing of prisoners to use the toilet without adequate privacy amounts to a violation of Article 8 (right to respect for private life) of the European Convention on Human Rights.

=== In Vietnam ===
In Vietnam, many cities, especially large and densely populated cities, are experiencing a severe shortage of public toilets due to lack of land for toilet construction. The general situation of toilets in Vietnam is insufficient, poorly installed, and dirty. Many public places do not have toilets, leading to the situation of littering everywhere.

== Gallery ==
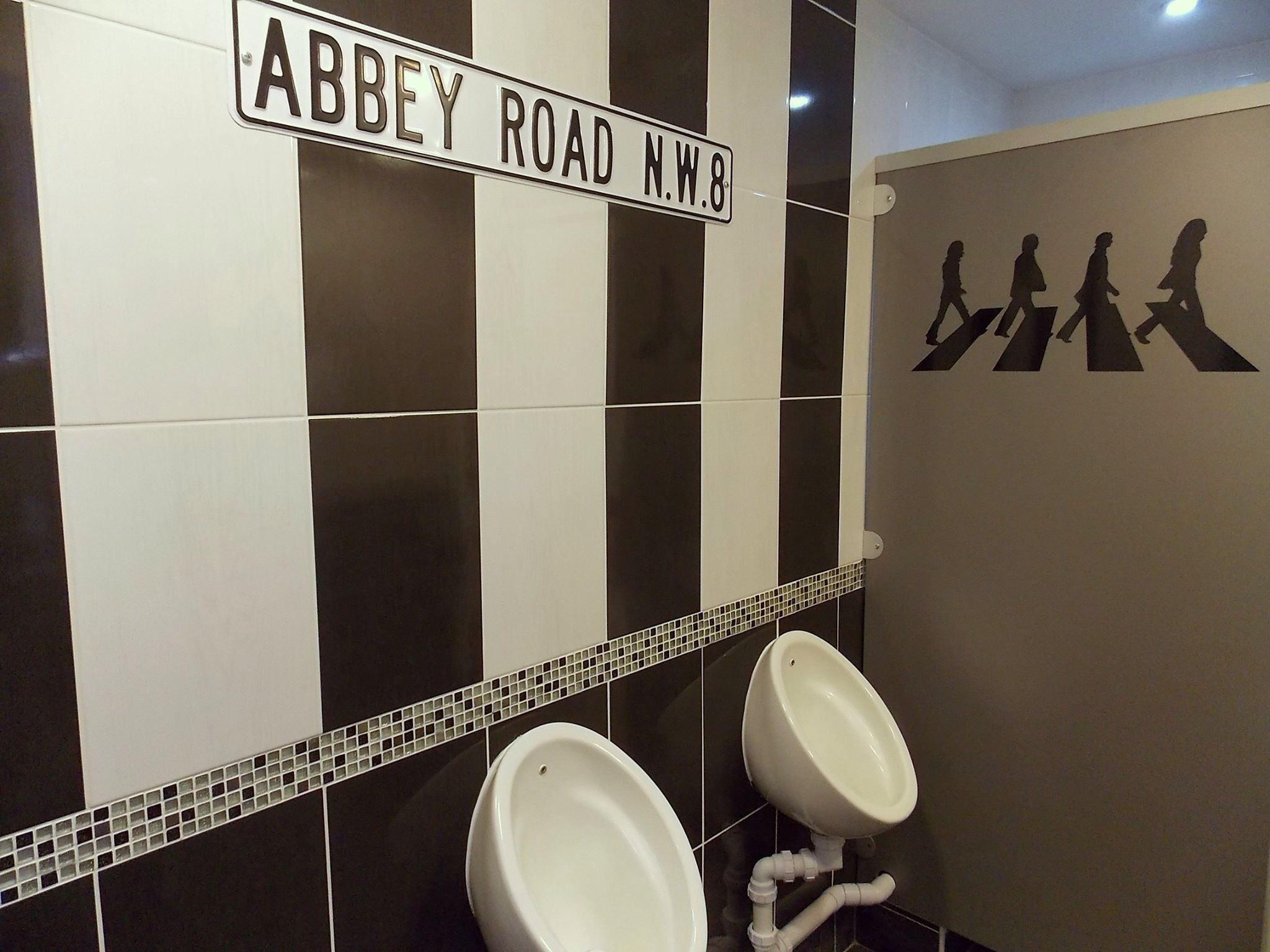
Gents' toilets inspired by the Beatles album Abbey Road in Parkend, England

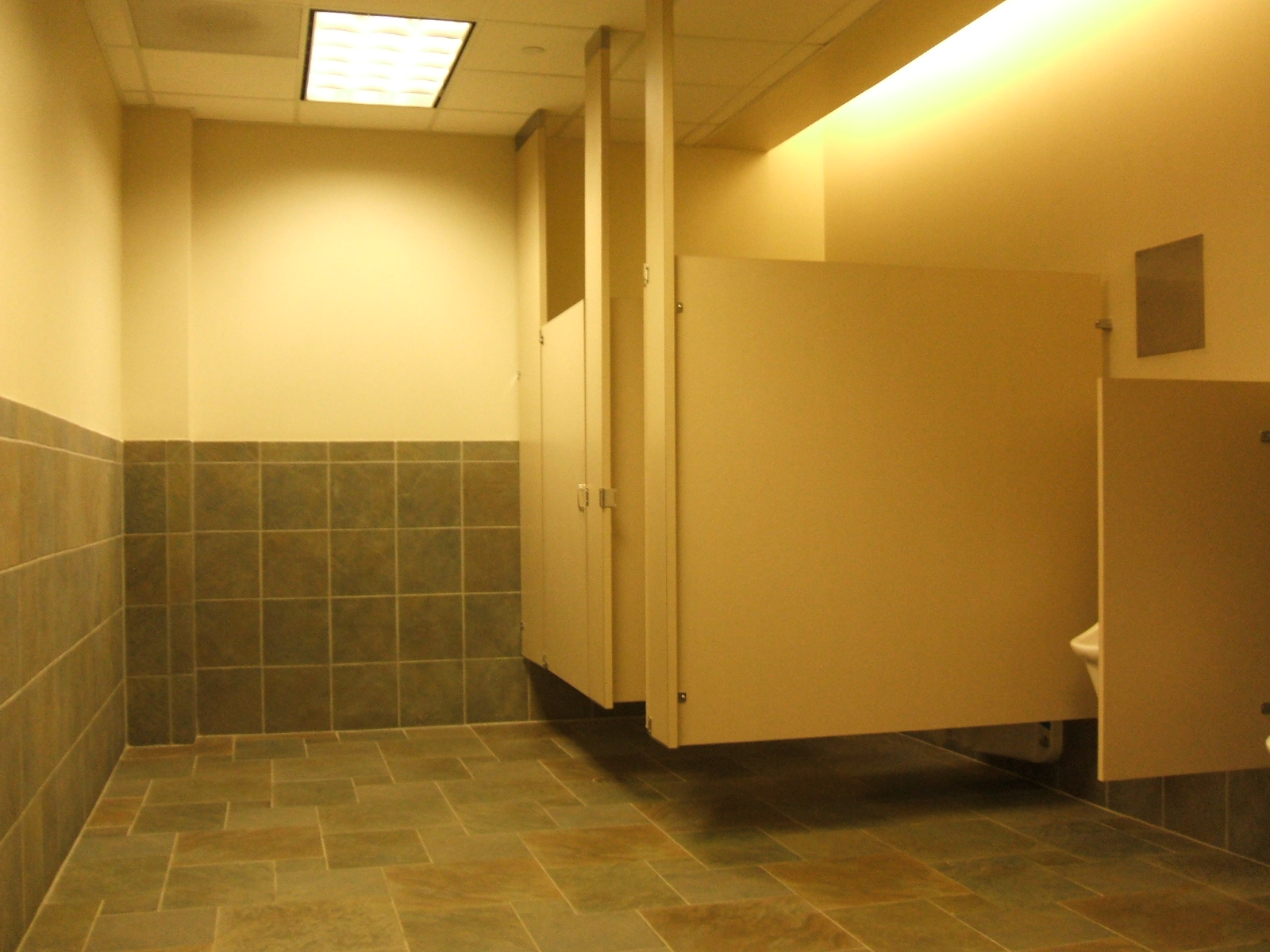
Typical male public toilet in the United States

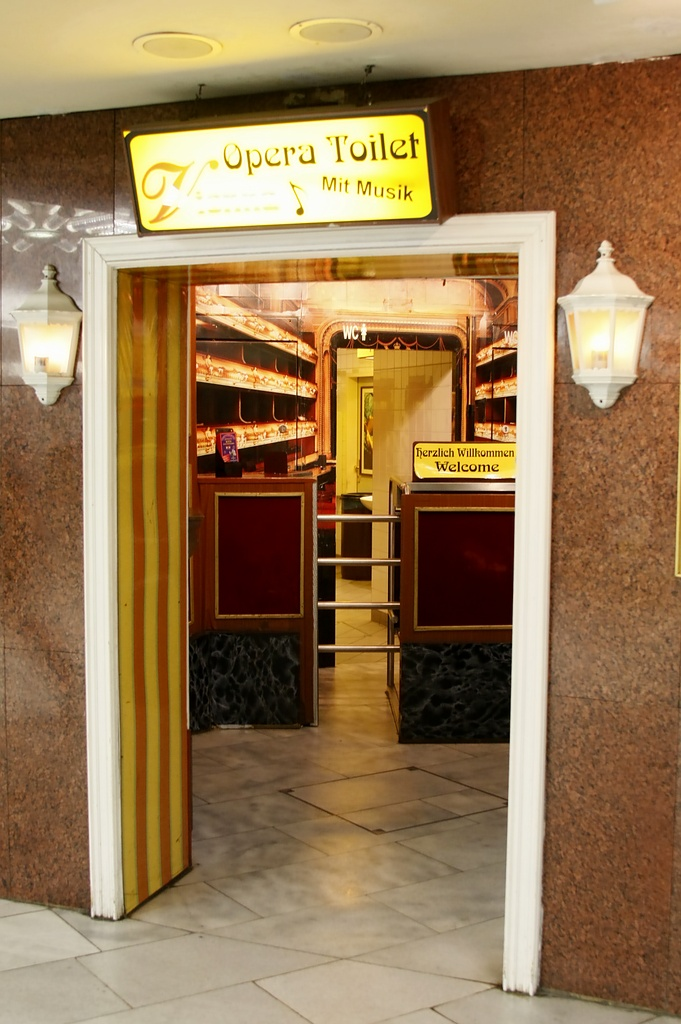
The public toilet at the Vienna State Opera has recorded music.

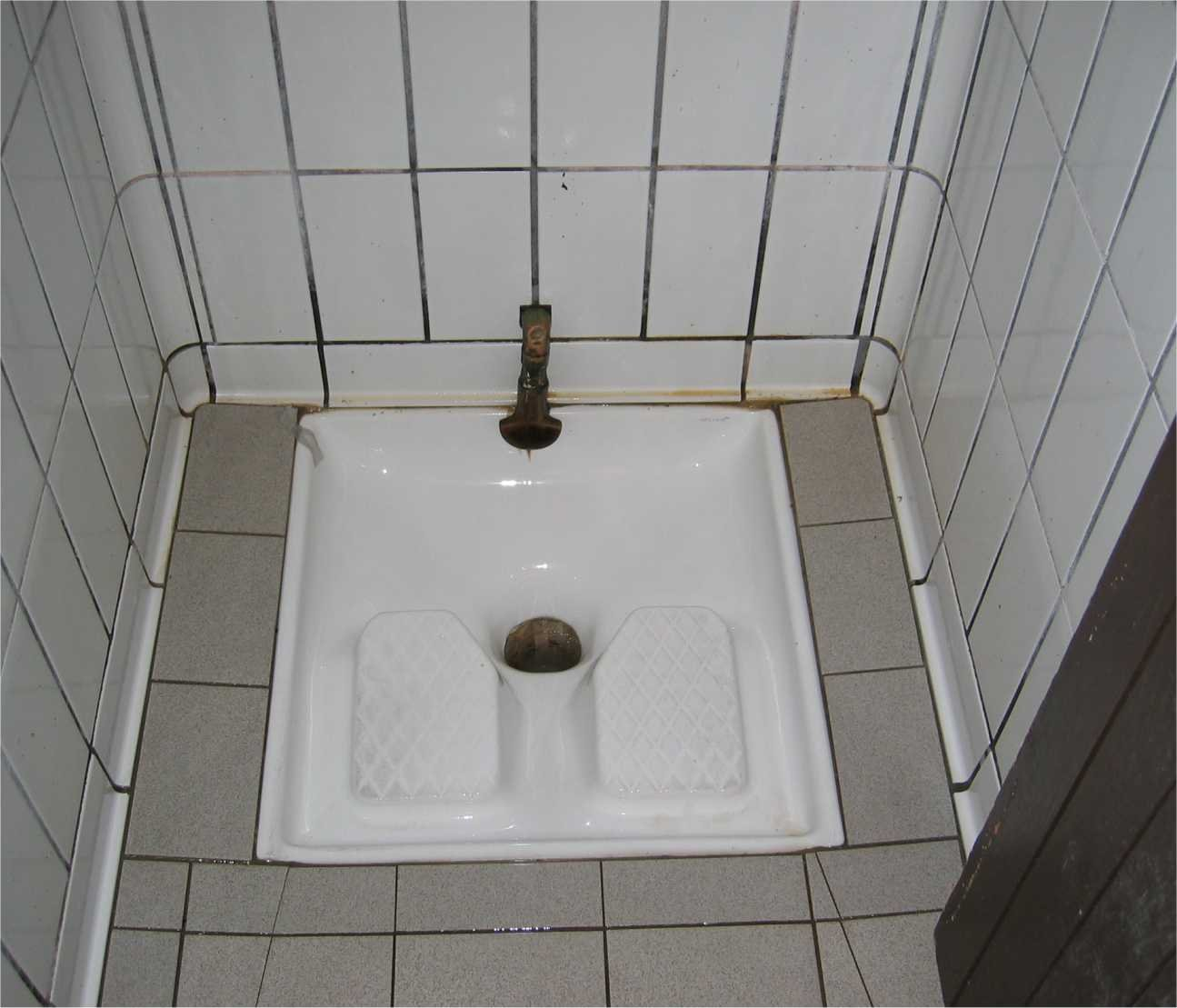
Roadside squat toilet near Toulouse, France

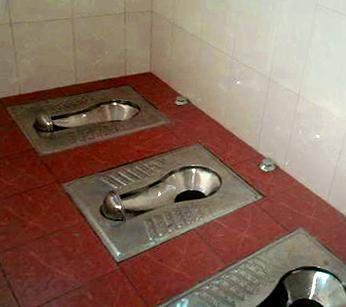
Traditional squat toilets in Beijing, China

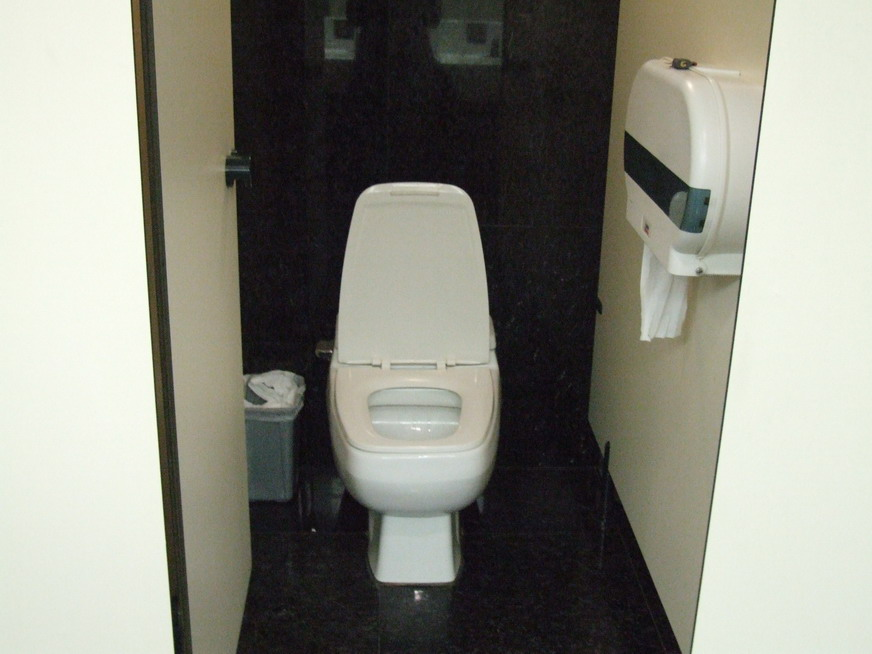
Modern sit toilet in Beijing Airport, China

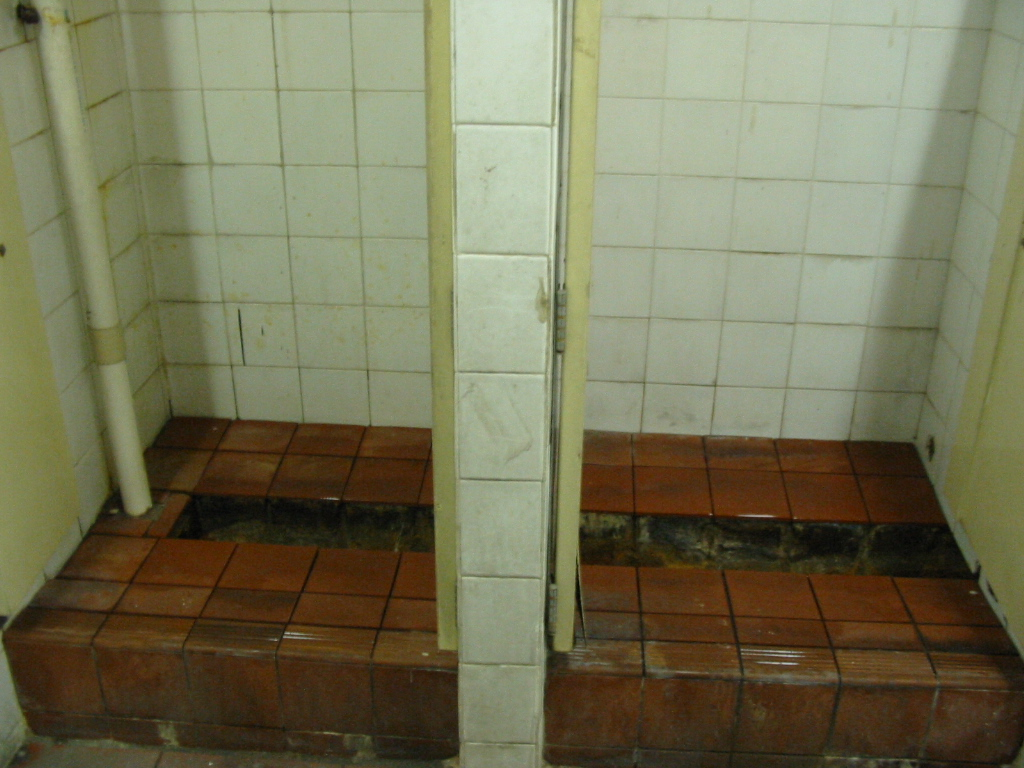
Trough closet cubicles in a Hong Kong factory

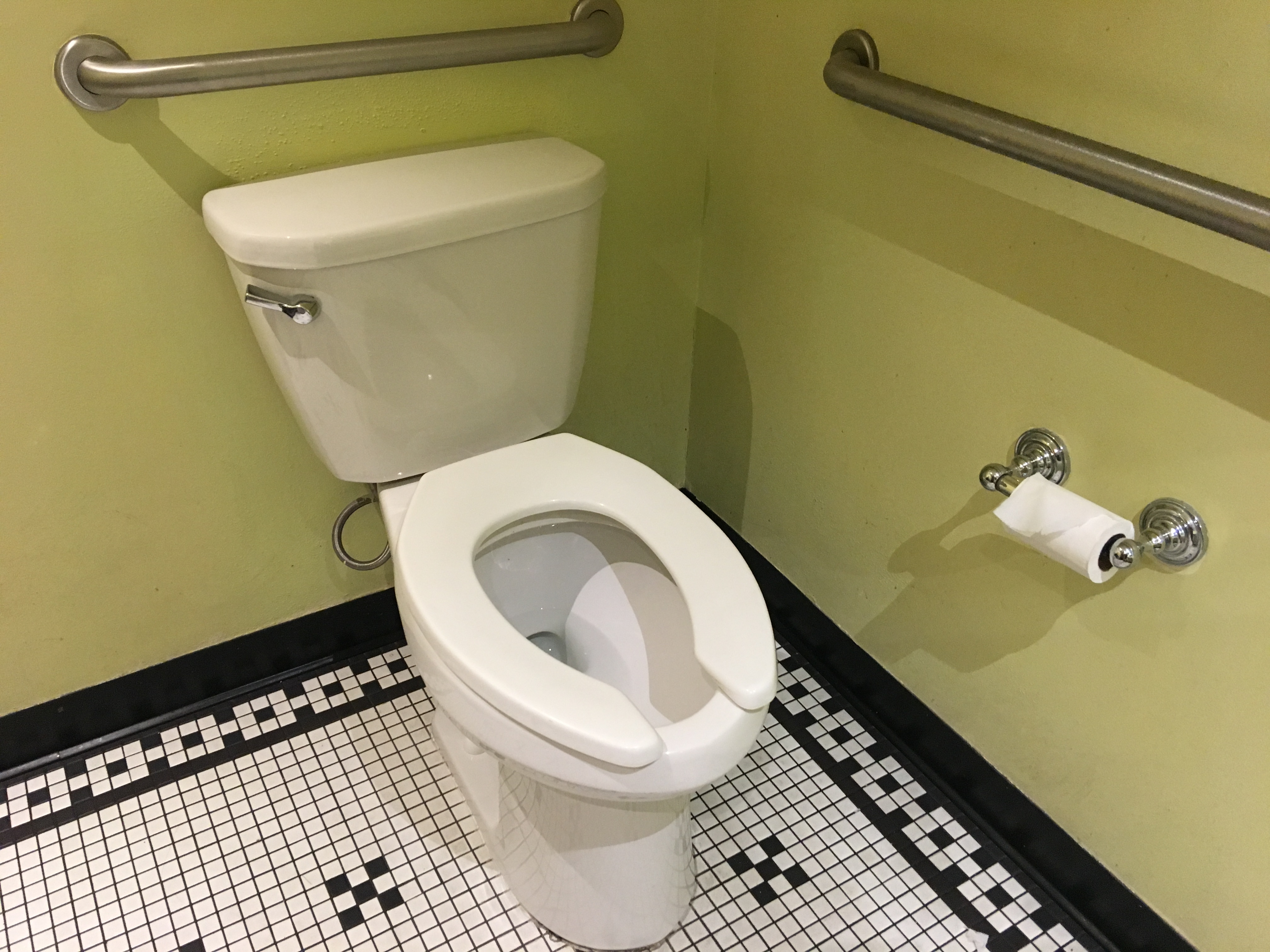
Public toilet in New Hampshire, U.S.

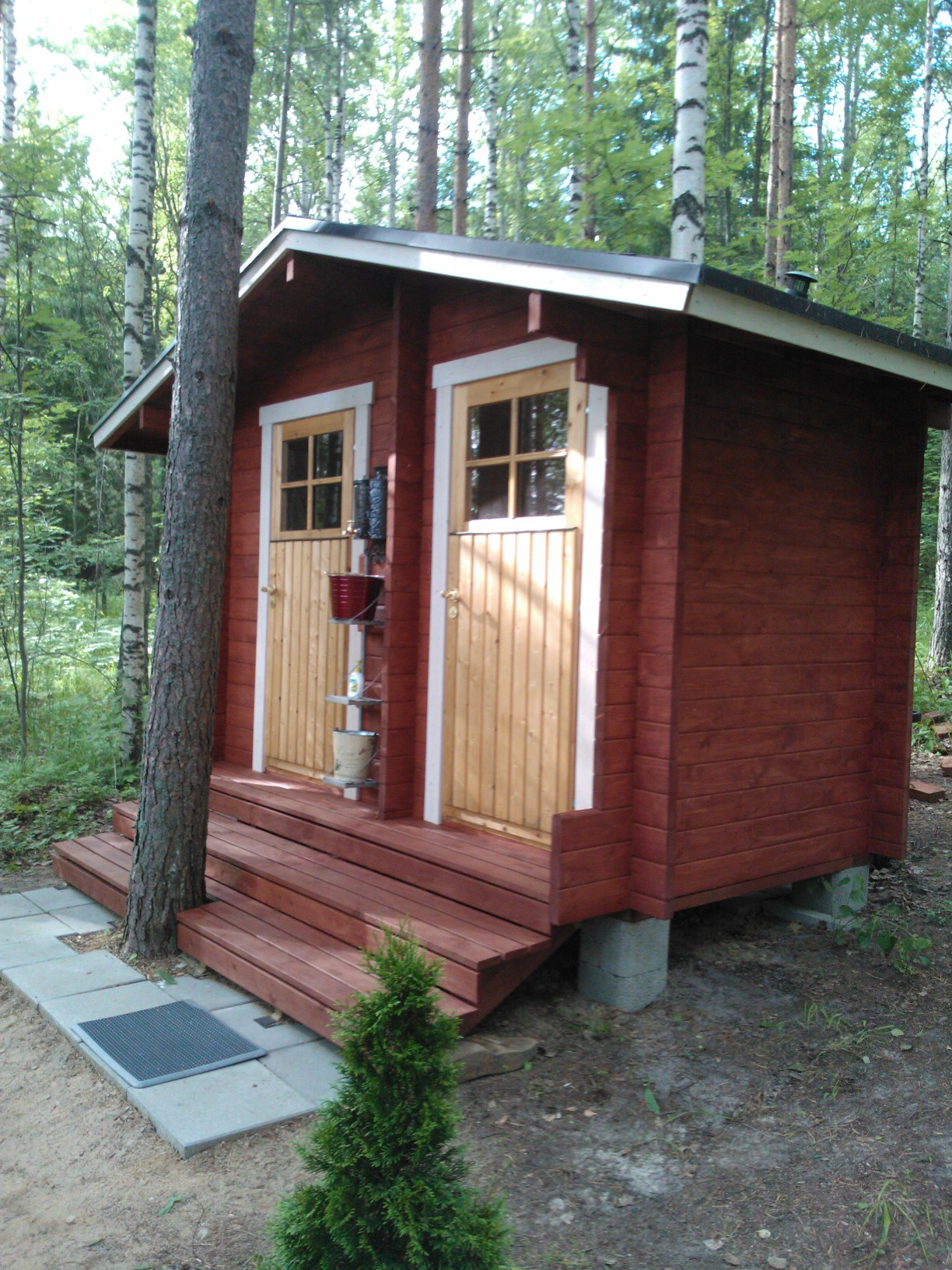
An outhouse toilet in Rantasalmi, South Savo, Finland

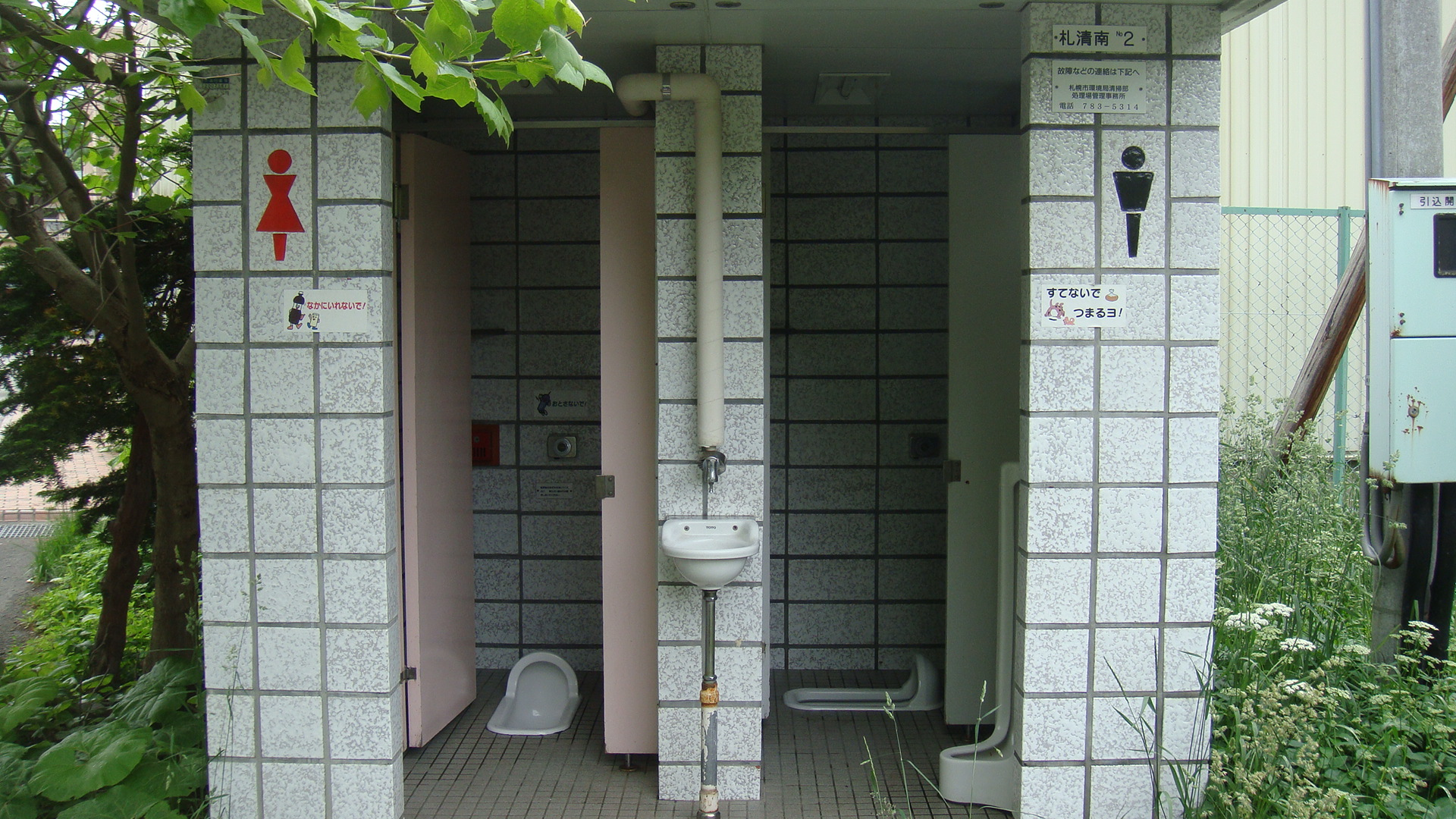
Public toilet at Jozankei Hot Springs, Hokkaido, Japan

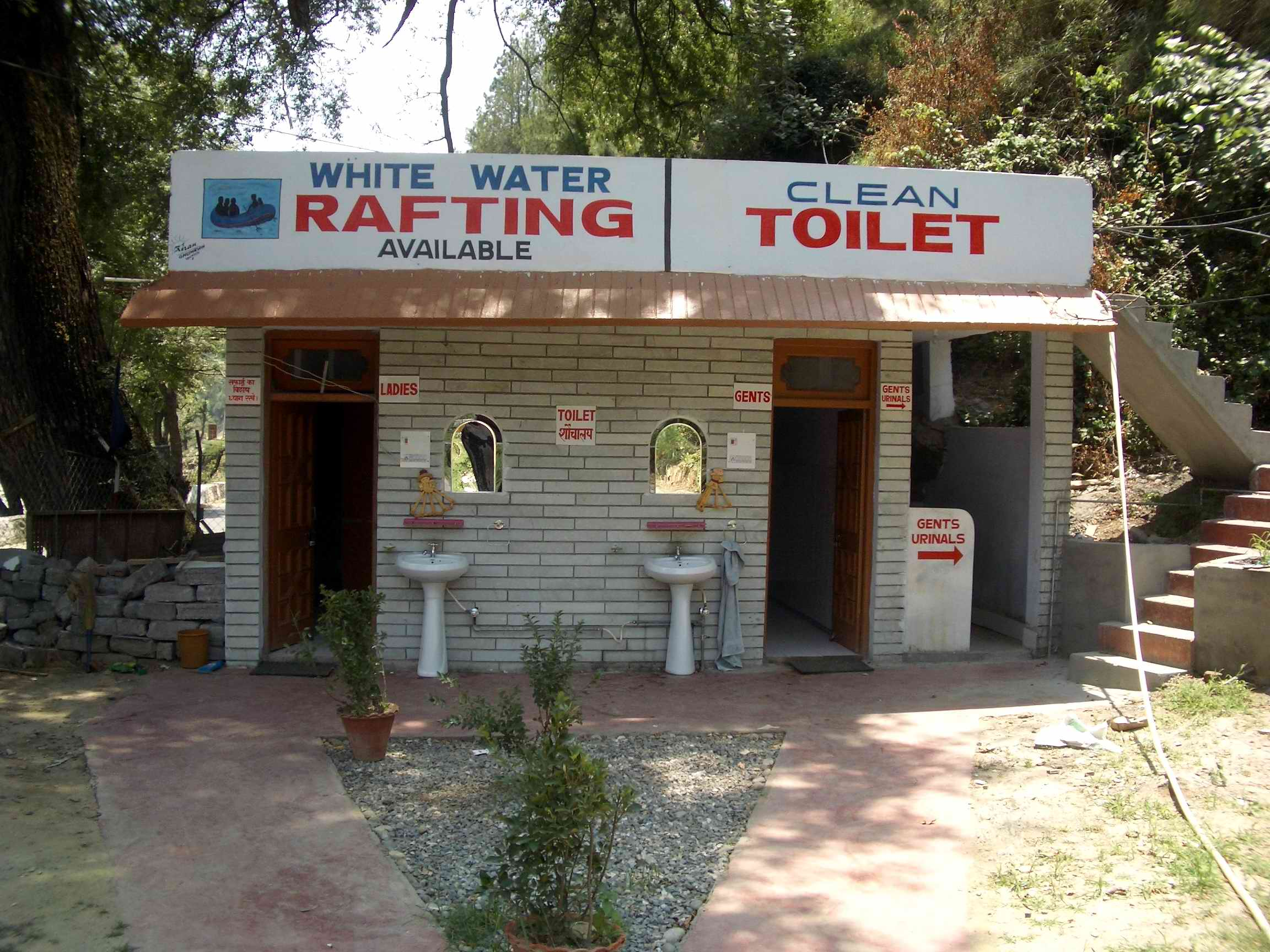
Public toilets near Kullu, Himachal Pradesh, India

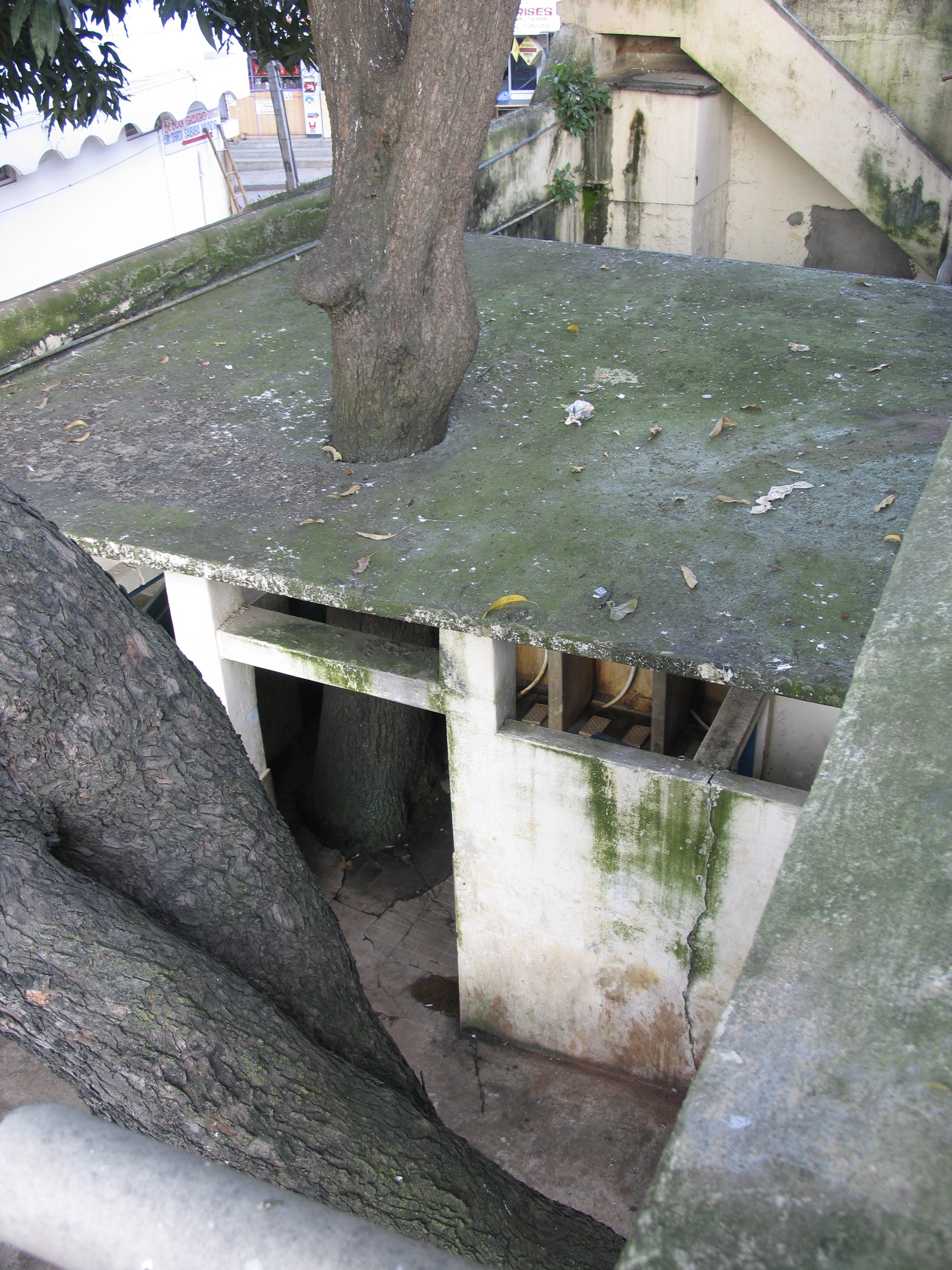
Public toilets near cinema in Bangalore, India

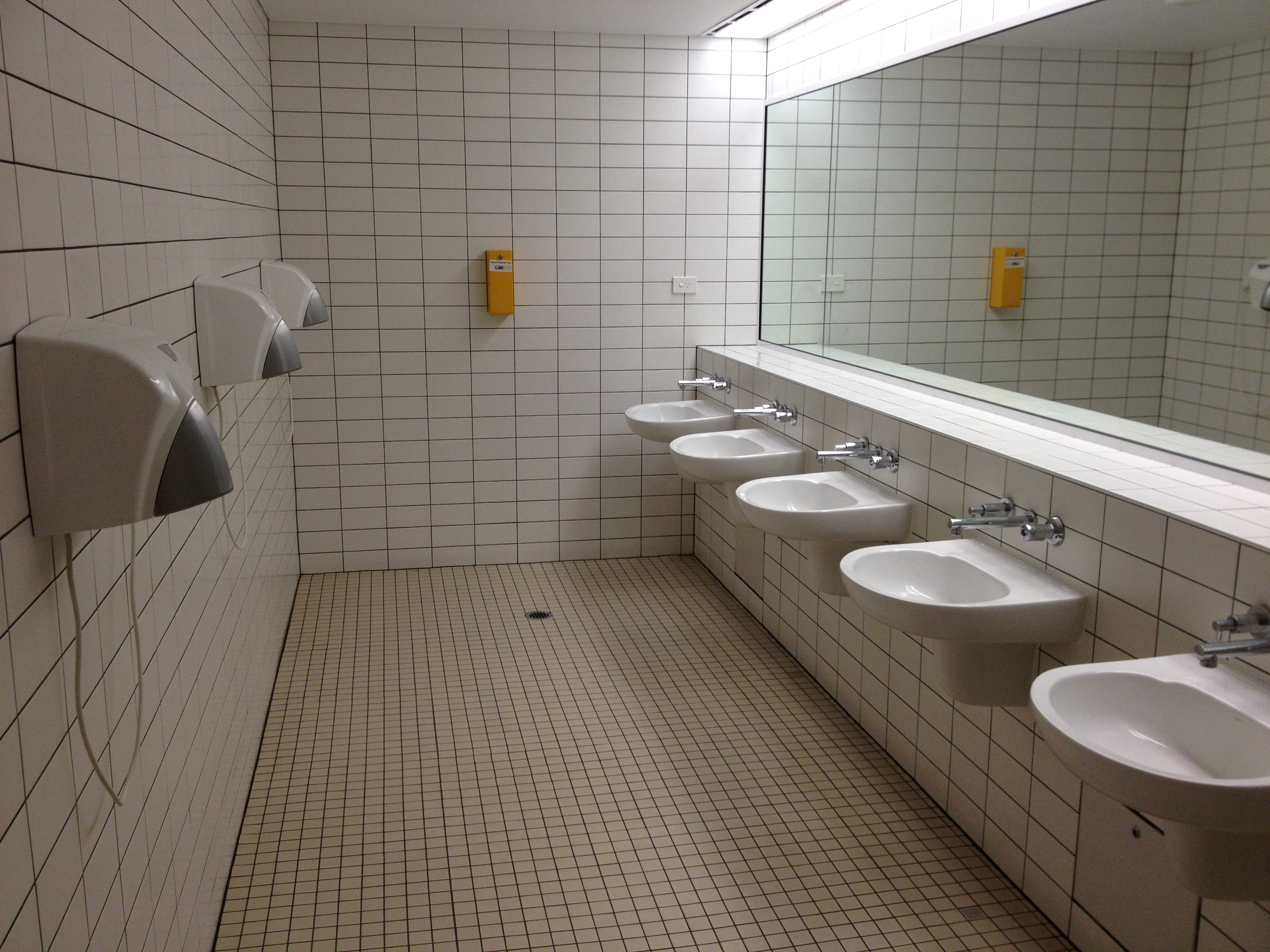
Sinks in the public toilet of the Queensland Art Gallery

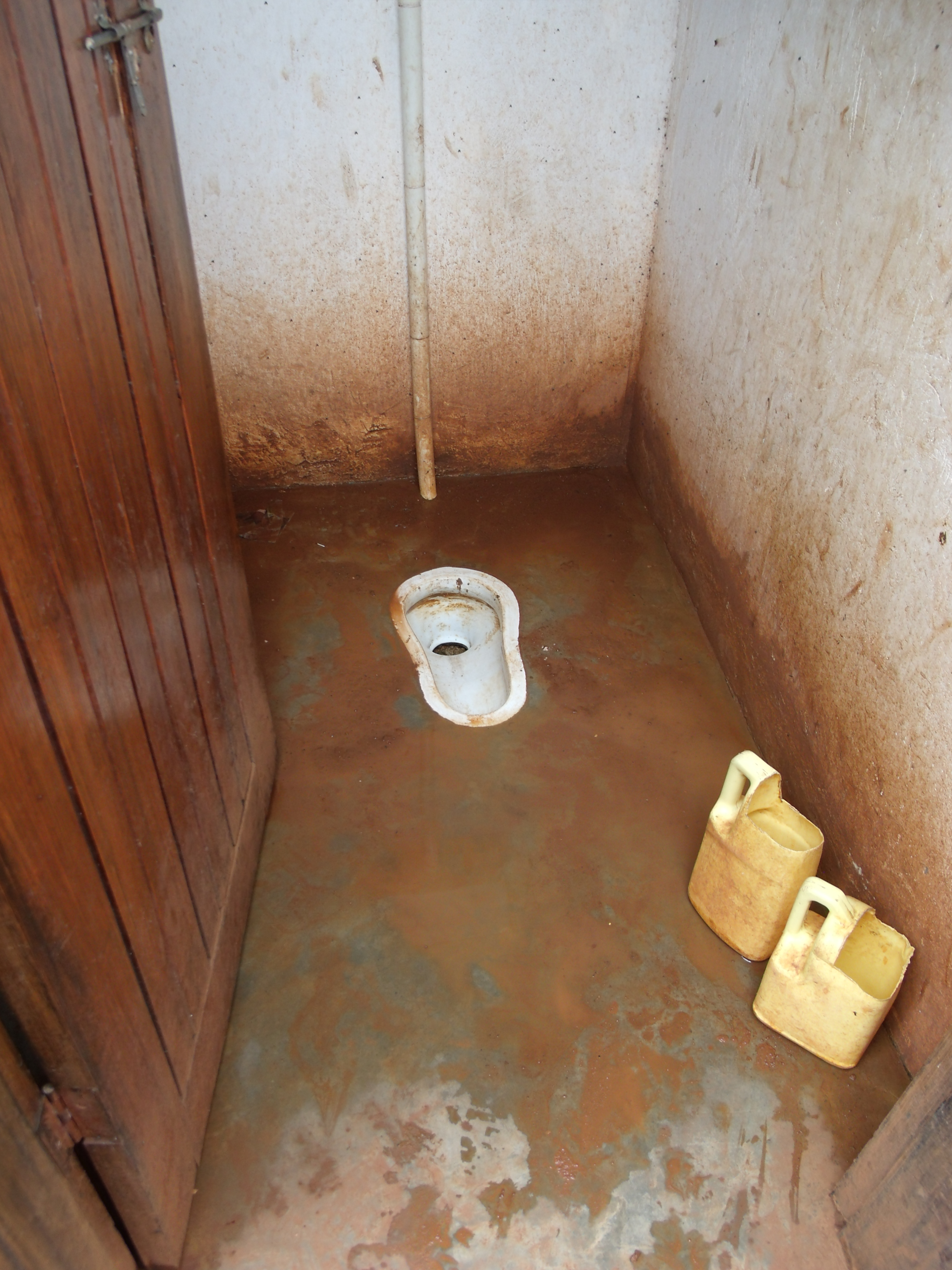
Inside of cubicle in public toilet in informal settlement in Kampala, Uganda

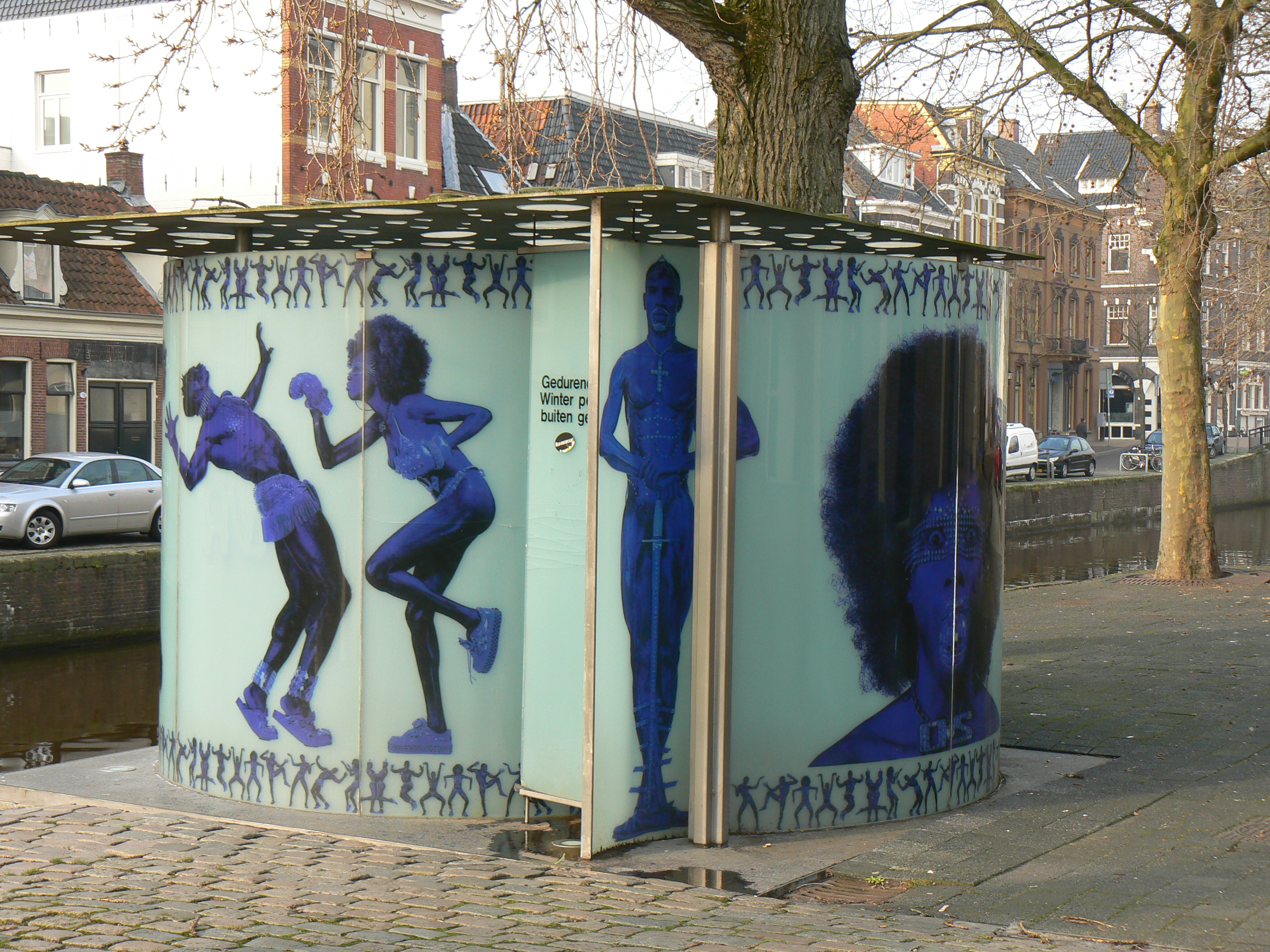
Public toilet by Rem Koolhaas and Erwin Olaf in Groningen, the Netherlands

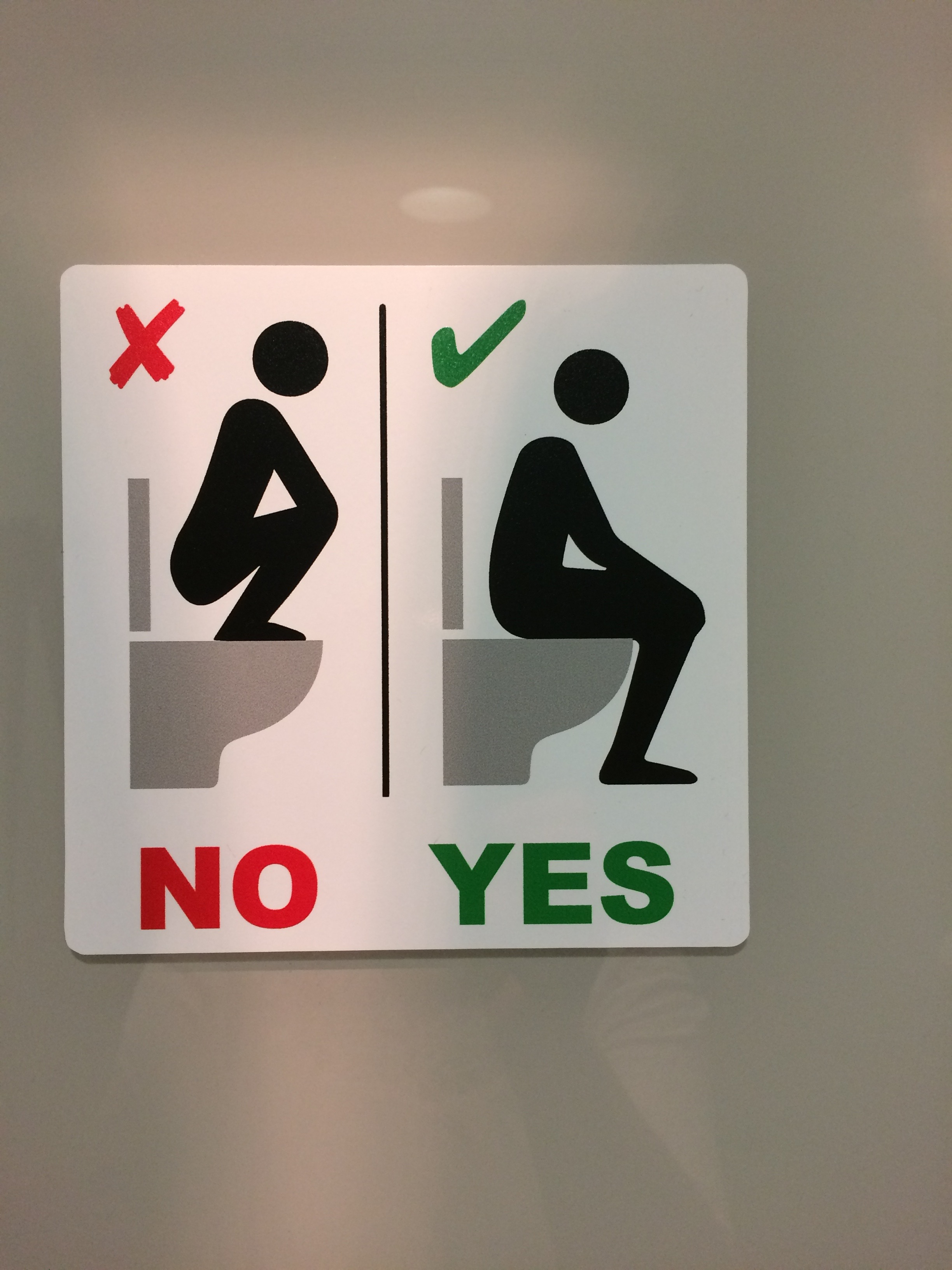
Instructions posted in women's public toilet, Germany

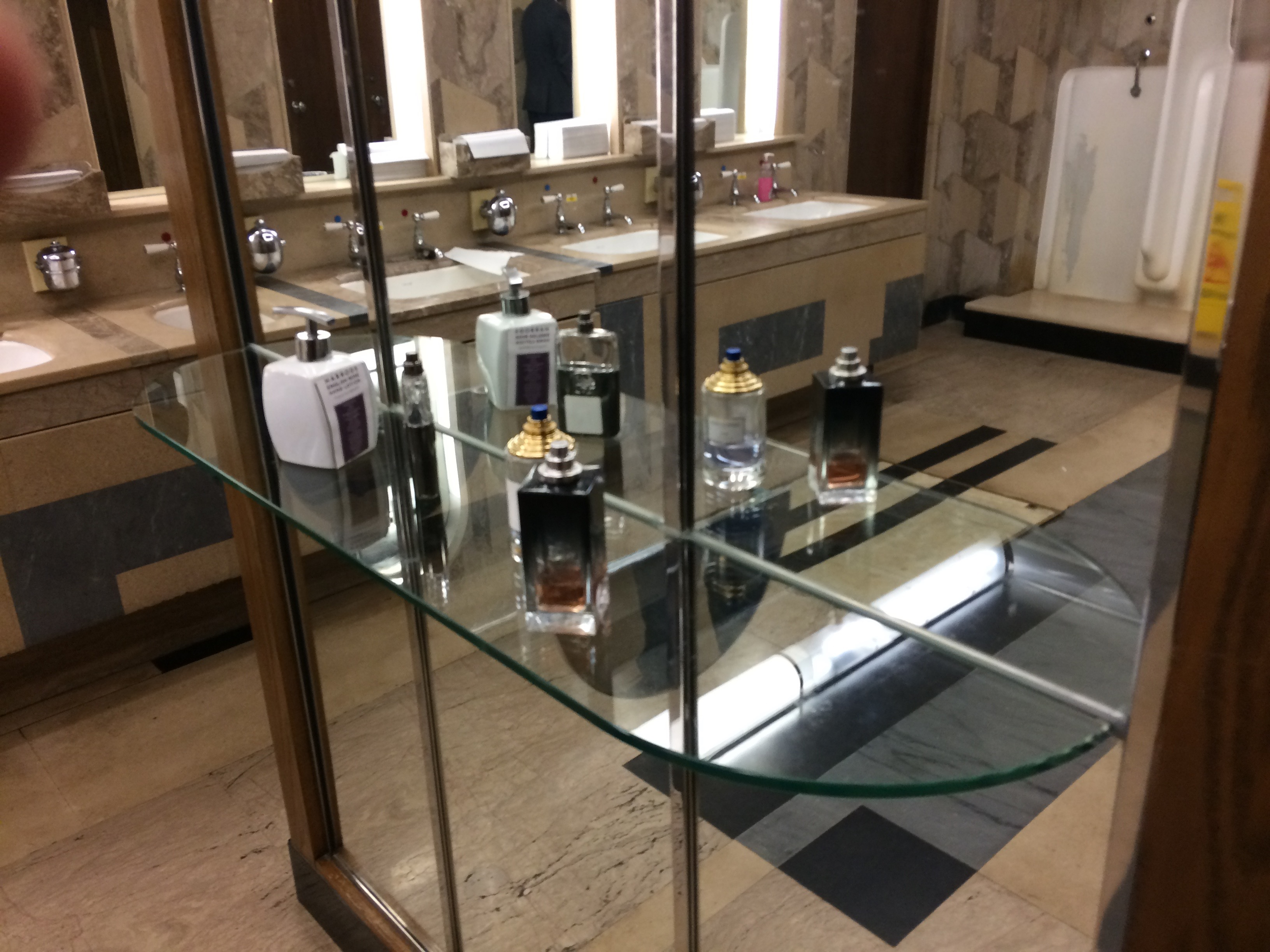
Gents' toilets in Harrods department store in London

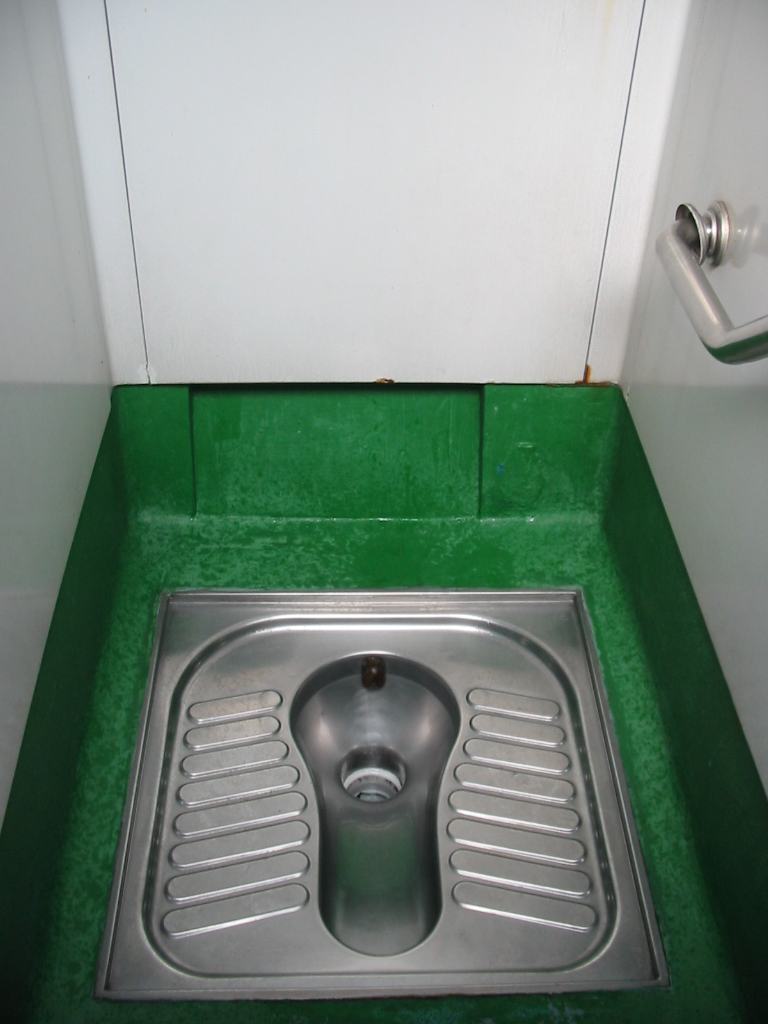
Public squat toilet in Hong Kong

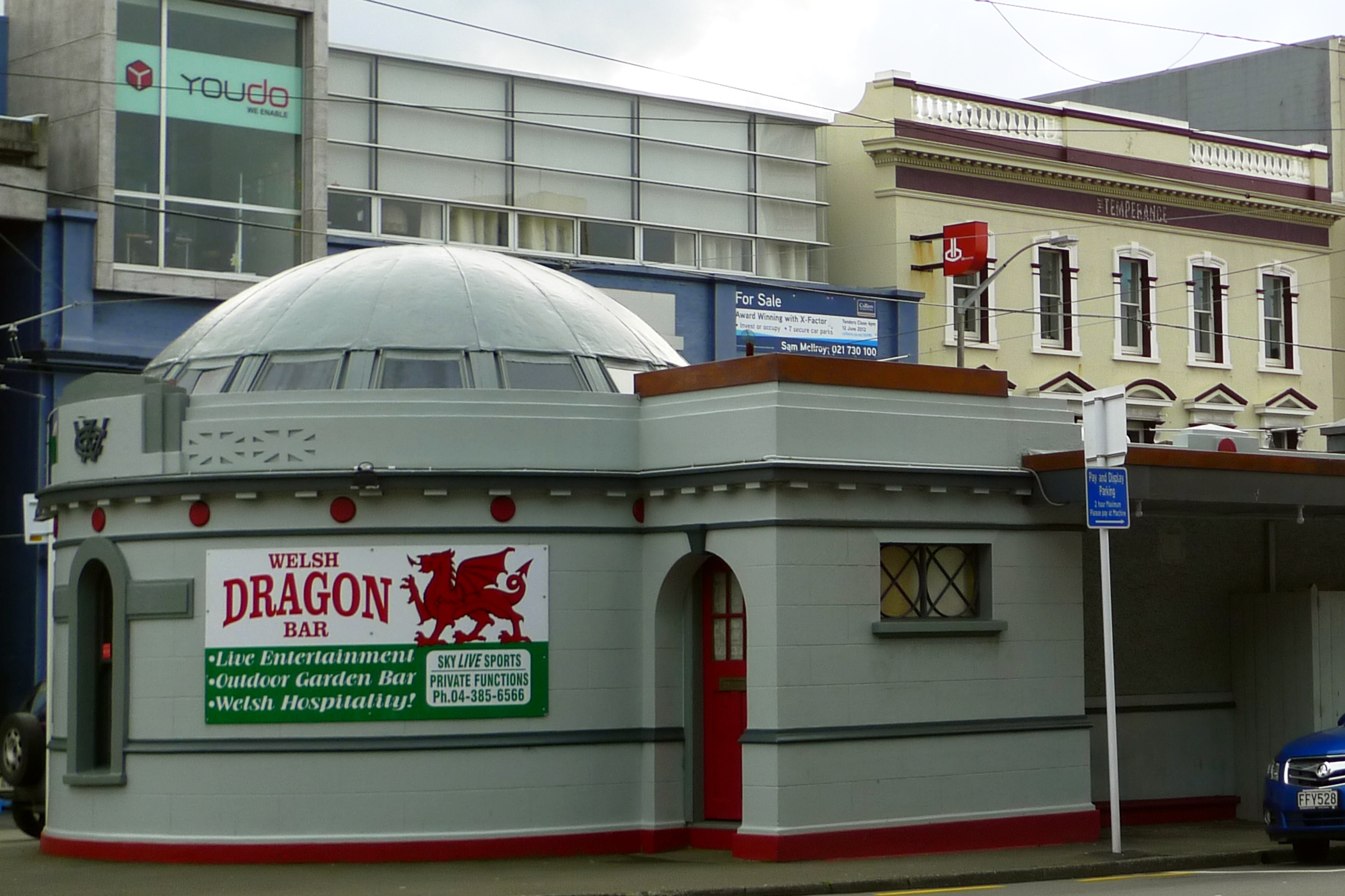
Welsh Dragon Bar, Wellington, New Zealand; formerly a public toilet

Toilet sign / AIGA badges

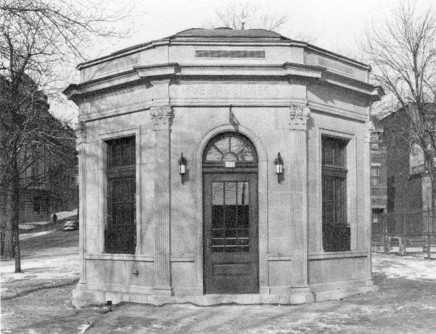
Vespasienne pissoir in Montréal, Quebec

== See also ==
- Accessible toilet
- Toilet room, in a private setting
- EToilet
- National Public Toilet Map (in Australia)
- Human right to water and sanitation
- Sanitation
- Self-cleaning floor
- Spray-and-vac cleaning, a method of professional cleaning
- World Toilet Day
- World Toilet Organization
