= Workplace safety =

Workplace safety may refer to:

- Occupational safety and health, a cross-disciplinary area concerned with protecting the safety, health and welfare of people engaged in work or employment
- Workplace Safety and Health Act, Singapore
