= AIHS =

AIHS may refer to:

- Australian Institute of Health and Safety Melbourne, Australia
- Ace Institute of Health Sciences, Pakistan
- American Irish Historical Society
- Australian International Hotel School, Canberra, Australia
- International Academy of the History of Science (French: Académie Internationale d'Histoire des Sciences)
