= List of acts of the Parliament of Western Australia from 2002 =

This is a list of acts of the Parliament of Western Australia for the year 2002.

== 2002 ==
Short title, or popular name	Citation	Royal assent
Long title
Law Reform (Miscellaneous Provisions (Asbestos Diseases)) Act 2002	No. 1 of 2002	20 March 2002
An Act to amend the Law Reform (Miscellaneous Provisions) Act 1941 (Note: Law Reform (Miscellaneous Provisions) Act 1941 (No. 29)) to provide for the survival of claims for damages in certain causes of action in relation to asbestos-related conditions and for other purposes.
Railway (Jandakot to Perth) Act 2002	No. 40 of 2002	5 December 2002
An Act to authorise the construction of a railway from Jandakot to Perth.
	No. X of 2002	
Occupational Safety and Health Amendment Act 2002	No. 54 of 2002	3 January 2003
An Act to amend the Occupational Safety and Health Act 1984 (Note: Occupational Health, Safety and Welfare Act 1984 (No. 101)) to extend its operation to police officers, and for related purposes.

== Sources ==
- "legislation.wa.gov.au".
