= Worksafe =

WorkSafe is a term used for workplace health and safety organisations.

- Worksafe Inc, workers' health and safety non-profit organization in Oakland, California
- WorkSafeBC, the Workers' Compensation Board of British Columbia
- WorkSafe New Zealand, the workplace health and safety regulator in New Zealand
- WorkSafe Victoria, the trading name of the Victorian Workcover Authority
- Worksafe (Western Australia), an agency in the Western Australian Department of Commerce

== See also ==
- Not safe for work, a term describing web content not suitable for workplace or public viewing
