= Australian Institute of Health and Safety =

The Australian Institute of Health and Safety (previously known as the Safety Engineering Society of Australia and the Safety Institute of Australia) is Australia's peak body for the occupational health and safety profession. Established in 1948, the institute has a membership of over 4,000 individuals and more than 50 corporate members. In many cases, members work actively in the field of OHS as health and safety representatives or OHS practitioners or professionals. Other members simply have an interest in health and safety in the workplace.

== History ==
The Safety Engineering Society of Australia was founded by a small group of students who enrolled in, and attended, the first industrial safety and accident prevention course conducted by Melbourne Technical College in 1948. Graduates from the course were awarded a Certificate of Industrial Safety and Accident Prevention.

After completing the course, the group of students collaborated to form the nucleus of the society, and held regular monthly meetings. The founding members of the society included:

- Eric Warburton (the first President)
- Chris Allan (the first Secretary)
- Eugene Falk (Secretary)
- Harold Greenwood-Thomas, Bill Reid, Bill Jenkins, Peter Cathcart, Bill Carroll and Cecil Holmes.

Membership of the society expanded steadily in the early years, reaching a point where every state had a branch affiliated with the federal body. In general, membership included a majority of safety engineers and safety officers, as well as some medical practitioners, insurance officers, occupational nurses, educators and other people interested in promoting health, safety and accident prevention.

With time, it became apparent that the term "safety engineering" in the society's name emphasised only one of the many disciplines associated with the effective control of accidents, injuries and diseases. As a result, the Safety Institute of Australia was incorporated in 1977 with a new constitution and members of the society became members of the new SIA.

Some of the notable people who carried forward the aims and objectives of the society at that time were Eric Wigglesworth, Samuel Barclay, Sol Freedman, Frank Kuffer, Roger Smith, Cip Corva, Hilton Ludekens and Fred Catlin.

== Activities ==
=== Library ===
In 1977, the SIA joined with the South Melbourne Technical School in establishing a specialist resource collection in the field of industrial safety and health. This library became the most comprehensive research resource available for safety professionals and was maintained by institute members for many years.

=== Diploma course ===
In 1981, the SIA played a major role in launching Ballarat College of Advanced Education’s occupational hazard management course, the first tertiary level, graduate diploma, course of its kind. Since that time, the SIA has successfully promoted and supported a wide range of undergraduate, graduate and postgraduate educational courses around Australia, and today the Australian OHS Education Accreditation Board (AOHSEAB) continues this work.

=== Events ===
Through its early decades, the SIA ran many events and conferences for members.

In September 1987, this accelerated when the institute joined with the International Commission on Occupational Health and ran the 22nd International Congress on Occupational Health in Sydney, Australia, titled "Work for Health". The program offered 288 oral presentations and 178 poster presentations, selected from 760 abstracts submitted by a variety of professionals with an interest in the science of safety and injury prevention.

Since that time, the institute has run nearly 100 state and national conferences and continues to provide an active conference program including state and territory events and a national annual safety convention, which brings together the wider health and safety community.

These include a 1991 conference with the Victorian Occupational Health and Safety Commission on noise control and hearing conservation to coincide with the introduction of new regulations and a code of practice. Noise was noted at the time as one of the oldest recognised workplace hazards.

=== Working relationships ===
Since 1958, the institute has maintained a close working relationship with the Standards Australia. The institute has served on many technical committees dealing with, among others, risk management, fire safety, occupational health and safety, road and traffic design and the Building Code of Australia. Members have represented Australian standards while attending conferences and working parties with the International Organization for Standardization and the European Committee for Standardization. Today, the AIHS has representatives on 15 standards committees.

The AIHS also has a long history in working with regulators, employers, unions and government departments in the pursuit of more effective health and safety policy and regulation. Over the decades, branches of the institute have often had very strong links to the regulators within their state or territory, engaging in shared activities and projects reflect the common interests that the institute shares with these bodies. The institute was also a member of the National Occupational Health and Safety Committee (NOHSC), the precursor to Safe Work Australia and the institute retains ongoing links with Safe Work Australia.

== See also ==
- National Safety Council of Australia
