= Safety Jackpot =

Safety Jackpot is a commercially available gamecard based incentive program created in 1991 aimed at reducing workplace accidents. The program works by rewarding gamecards to employees for weekly safe behavior. The scratch off gamecards reveal points which employees collect and redeem for merchandise items in the program catalog. The bottom of each gamecard reveals a letter. When the word 'jackpot' is spelled, the employee receives bonus points and is entered into a series of sweepstakes drawings for cash rewards.
