= Ace Institute of Health Sciences =

Educational institution in Lahore, Pakistan

Coordinates: 31.4894°N 74.3131°E

Ace Institute of Health Sciences (AIHS) is a medical sciences institution in Pakistan.

The institute is located in Lahore, and was established in 1999 as the first independent professional health sciences institute in the private sector. The institute consists of five academic departments, an Intermediate college, a tertiary level diagnostic laboratory service, a PCR center, a dental center, and a physiotherapy center.

AIHS offers 16 professional degree and diploma programs in Pharmaceutical Sciences, Physical Medicine & Rehabilitation, Biomedical Laboratory Sciences, Dental Sciences and Medical and Surgical technologies.

== Affiliations and recognitions ==
AIHS is recognized by and affiliated with universities and professional accrediting bodies including the following:

- University of Sargodha, Government of the Punjab
- University of Health Sciences (UHS), Lahore, Government of the Punjab
- King Edward Medical University, Lahore
- Pharmacy Council of Pakistan, Ministry of Health, Government of Pakistan
- Health Department, Punjab Medical Faculty, Government of the Punjab
- Education Department, Government of the Punjab
- Board of Intermediate & Secondary Education, Education Department, Government of the Punjab

== Academic programs ==
The institute offers the following academic programs:

- Doctor of Pharmacy (Pharm D) Program
- Doctor of Pysiotharapy (DPT) Program
- Pharmacy Technician (Category 'B') Course
- FSc Physiotherapy
- FSc Dental Hygiene
- FSc Ophthalmology
- FSc Medical Imaging Technology
- FSc Medical Laboratory Technology
- FSc Operation Theater Technology
- Dental Hygiene (Professional Diploma)
- Dental Technician (Professional Diploma)
- Laboratory Technician (Professional Diploma)
- Laboratory Assistant (Professional Diploma)
- Radiography Technician (Professional Diploma)
- Operation Theater Tech (Professional Diploma)
- Pharmacy Apprentice (Category 'C') Diploma

The institute has training linkages with a number of hospitals and medical centers, retail pharmacy chains, pharmaceutical industries and other healthcare organizations.

== Campuses and facilities ==
The institute has two campuses in central Lahore. The institute has following campuses: Campus-1 6-P, Model Town Lahore Tel: 042-35161016,035165723 Fax: 042-35175674

Campus-2 18-E, Model Town Lahore Tel: 042-35850307-8 Fax:042-35175674

The total faculty strength is 65 (full-time and adjunct). Almost 45% of faculty have an M. Phil or higher degree. 20% of the faculty has a Ph.D or terminal degree in their specialization. Some of the pioneer faculty appointed by Brigadier (Retd) Muhammad Afzal (L) Chairman & Founder of the institution include Dr. Abbass Bhatti, Dr. Usman Ghani, Dr. Yasir Naqvi, Mr. Shams-ul-Hassan, Dr. Ghulam Jilany Khan, Dr. Ali Jawad, Ms. Rabia Naveed, Ms. Rabia Saleem, Dr. Ata-Ul-Hasnain, Mr. Shahzad Qamar, Ms. Wafa Sidiqui. Ms. Solat. Since 1999, when the institute opened its doors, more than 5,000 students have graduated with a degree or a professional diploma.
