= Safe Work Australia =

Government agency responsible for work health and safety

Safe Work Australia is an Australian Government statutory agency established in 2009 under the Safe Work Australia Act 2008. Their primary responsibility is to improve work health and safety and workers’ compensation arrangements across Australia.

They represent a genuine partnership between governments, unions and industry, working together towards the goal of reducing death, injury and disease in the workplace.

Safe Work Australia is jointly funded by the Commonwealth, state and territory governments through the Intergovernmental Agreement for Regulatory and Operational Reform in Occupational Health and Safety signed in July 2008.

== Governance ==
Safe Work Australia comprises 15 Members who work with agency staff to deliver the objectives of the strategic and operational plans. These members include an independent Chair, nine members representing the Commonwealth and each state and territory, two members representing the interests of workers, two representing the interests of employers and the Chief Executive Officer. Safe Work Australia Members meet at least three times a year.

== History ==
On 1 November 2009, Safe Work Australia began operating as an independent statutory agency. Below is a table outlining Safe Work Australia’s history.

Safe Work Australia (Independent Statutory Agency)	1 November 2009 – present
Safe Work Australia (Executive Agency)	July 2009 – October 2009
Safe Work Australia (group within the Department of Education, Employment and Workplace Relations)	April 2009 – June 2009
Australian Safety and Compensation Council (ASCC)	October 2005 – March 2009
National Occupational Health and Safety Commission (NOHSC)	December 1985 – September 2005

== Role ==
Safe Work Australia works to:

- raise awareness of work health and safety as a key issue in the community
- improve work health and safety, by understanding what influences Australian workplace cultures and then putting in place mechanisms to effect change
- harmonize work health and safety laws throughout Australia
- develop national work health and safety and workers’ compensation policy, and
- identify opportunities for improvement in workers’ compensation arrangements.

This is achieved by:

- promoting work health and safety through events including National Safe Work Australia Week and the annual Safe Work Australia Awards
- developing, implementing and driving the new National Work Health and Safety Strategy 2012–2022
- developing, implementing and monitoring the harmonised work health and safety framework
- developing and implementing the National Workers’ Compensation Action Plan 2010–2013
- developing and maintaining collaborative Australian and international partnerships on work health and safety, and
- monitoring, collecting, analysing and reporting on research and data for work health and safety and workers’ compensation policy development and evaluation.

== Relationship with the Commonwealth, states and territories ==
Safe Work Australia works with the Commonwealth, state and territory governments to improve work health and safety and workers’ compensation arrangements. Safe Work Australia is the national policymaker, not a regulator of work health and safety. The Commonwealth, states and territories have responsibility for regulating and enforcing work health and safety laws in their jurisdiction.

== International collaboration ==
Safe Work Australia participates in a range of international activities. In line with the National OHS Strategy 2002-2012, Safe Work Australia undertakes these activities to improve communication with relevant national and international research bodies and improve national and international outcomes in work health and safety and workers' compensation. Safe Work Australia also participates in and facilitates visits to Australia from international organizations and government delegations seeking to exchange information about current work health and safety policy and practice.

Australia is a signatory to a number of international conventions (an international agreement between countries established through consensus) relating to work health and safety policy. Some of the international organizations Safe Work Australia works with include:

- United Nations
- International Labour Organization
- The Globally Harmonised System of Classification and Labeling of Chemicals (GHS)
- World Health Organization
- European Agency for Safety and Health at Work
- Organisation for Economic Co-operation and Development
- Asia-Pacific Economic Co-operation, and
- International Organization for Standardization

== See also ==
- Health care in Australia
- WorkSafe Victoria
- Worksafe (Western Australia)
