= Occupational infectious disease =

Infectious disease contracted in a workplace

An occupational infectious disease is an infectious disease that is contracted at the workplace. Biological hazards (biohazards) include infectious microorganisms such as viruses, bacteria and toxins produced by those organisms such as anthrax.

According to the International Labour Organization, by 2017 communicable diseases accounted for 9% of total estimated deaths attributed to work worldwide. They were more common in low-income countries, ranging from 30% in the Africa to less than 5% in high-income countries.

== From other workers and customers ==
COVID-19 is a significant respiratory disease that can be spread in workplaces. Vaccination is the most effective hazard control for COVID-19 to protect against severe illness or death. Breakthrough infections happen in only a small proportion of people who are fully vaccinated. The U.S. Occupational Safety and Health Administration recommends implementing multiple layers of controls, including measures such as remote work and flextime, engineering controls (especially increased ventilation), administrative controls such as vaccination policies, personal protective equipment (PPE), face coverings, social distancing, and enhanced cleaning programs with a focus on high-touch surfaces.

Influenza (flu) is another significant respiratory disease that can be spread in workplaces. Flu infections are estimated to cost employers $76.7 million a year in the United States due to employee absenteeism, presenteeism, and other indirect costs. Influenza-like illnesses accounted for 39% of all illness-related work days lost among unvaccinated participants. Hazard controls include encouraging all employees to get a seasonal flu vaccine; putting in place policies for telework or leave allowing sick workers, or workers caring for sick family members, to stay at home without fear of any reprisals; and promoting preventive actions such as respiratory etiquette and hand washing.

== From animals ==
Transmission of disease from animals to humans is known as zoonosis. Outdoor workers and those who work with animals have an elevated risk of zoonotic disease, including agricultural workers, veterinarians, landscapers, and construction workers.

=== Farm animals ===
Contact with farm animals can lead to disease in farmers or others that come into contact with infected farm animals. Glanders primarily affects those who work closely with horses and donkeys. Close contact with cattle can lead to cutaneous anthrax infection, whereas inhalation anthrax infection is more common for workers in slaughterhouses, tanneries and wool mills.

Methicillin-resistant Staphylococcus aureus (MRSA) has been identified in pigs and humans raising concerns about the role of pigs as reservoirs of MRSA for human infection. One study found that 20% of pig farmers in the United States and Canada in 2007 harbored MRSA. A second study revealed that 81% of Dutch pig farms had pigs with MRSA and 39% of animals at slaughter carried the bug were all of the infections were resistant to tetracycline and many were resistant to other antimicrobials. A more recent study found that MRSA ST398 isolates were less susceptible to tiamulin, an antimicrobial used in agriculture, than other MRSA or methicillin susceptible S. aureus. Cases of MRSA have increased in livestock animals. CC398 is a new clone of MRSA that has emerged in animals and is found in intensively reared production animals (primarily pigs, but also cattle and poultry), where it can be transmitted to humans. Although dangerous to humans, CC398 is often asymptomatic in food-producing animals.

Close contact with sheep who have recently given birth can lead to infection with the bacterium Chlamydia psittaci, causing chlamydiosis (and enzootic abortion in pregnant women), as well as increase the risk of Q fever, toxoplasmosis, and listeriosis, in the pregnant or otherwise immunocompromised. Echinococcosis is caused by a tapeworm, which can spread from infected sheep by food or water contaminated by feces or wool.

Bird flu is common in chickens and, while rare in humans, the main public health worry is that a strain of bird flu will recombine with a human flu virus and cause a pandemic like the 1918 Spanish flu. In 2017, free-range chickens in the UK were temporarily ordered to remain inside due to the threat of bird flu.

Cattle are an important reservoir of cryptosporidiosis, which mainly affects the immunocompromised. Reports have shown mink can also become infected.

In Western countries, Hepatitis E burden is largely dependent on exposure to animal products, and pork is a significant source of infection, in this respect.

Outbreaks of zoonoses have been traced to human interaction with, and exposure to, other animals at fairs, live animal markets, petting zoos, and other settings. In 2005, the Centers for Disease Control and Prevention (CDC) issued an updated list of recommendations for preventing zoonosis transmission in public settings. The recommendations, developed in conjunction with the National Association of State Public Health Veterinarians, include educational responsibilities of venue operators, limiting public animal contact, and animal care and management.

A July 2020 report by the United Nations Environment Programme stated that the increase in zoonotic pandemics is directly attributable to anthropogenic destruction of nature and the increased global demand for meat, and that the industrial farming of pigs and chickens in particular will be a primary risk factor for the spillover of zoonotic diseases in the future.

=== Wild animals ===
Some examples are West Nile virus and Lyme disease.

=== In veterinary medicine ===
Veterinarians are exposed to unique occupational hazards when it comes to zoonotic disease, including exposure to blood-borne pathogens. The close interactions with animals put veterinarians at increased risk of contracting zoonoses. A systematic review of veterinary students found that between 17 – 64% had acquired a zoonotic disease during their studies. The animal species, work setting, health and safety practices, and training can all affect the risk of injury and illness. Needlestick injuries can result in bloodborne-pathogen exposures; they are the most common accidents among veterinarians, but are likely underreported.

== From patients ==
In the health sector, the most common occupational infections are blood-borne pathogens including hepatitis B, hepatitis C, and HIV/AIDS; tuberculosis; methicillin-resistant Staphylococcus aureus (MRSA); and respiratory infections such as coronaviruses (including COVID-19) and influenza. Healthcare workers are also at risk for diseases that are contracted through extended contact with a patient, including scabies. Emerging infection disease is also of concern.

Health professionals are at risk for contracting blood-borne diseases through needlestick injuries or contact with bodily fluids. In epidemic situations, such as the 2014-2016 West African Ebola virus epidemic or the 2002–2004 SARS outbreak, healthcare workers are at even greater risk, and were disproportionately affected in both the Ebola and SARS outbreaks. Risk can be mitigated with vaccination when there is a vaccine available, like with hepatitis B.

Exposure to respiratory infectious diseases like tuberculosis (caused by Mycobacterium tuberculosis) and influenza can be reduced with the use of respirators; this exposure is a significant occupational hazard for health care professionals. In general, appropriate personal protective equipment (PPE) is the first-line mode of protection for healthcare workers from infectious diseases. For it to be effective against highly contagious diseases, personal protective equipment must be watertight and prevent the skin and mucous membranes from contacting infectious material. Different levels of personal protective equipment created to unique standards are used in situations where the risk of infection is different. Practices such as triple gloving and multiple respirators do not provide a higher level of protection and present a burden to the worker, who is additionally at increased risk of exposure when removing the PPE. Compliance with appropriate personal protective equipment rules may be difficult in certain situations, such as tropical environments or low-resource settings. A 2020 Cochrane systematic review found low-quality evidence that using more breathable fabric in PPE, double gloving, and active training reduce the risk of contamination but that more randomized controlled trials are needed for how best to train healthcare workers in proper PPE use.

The healthcare workforce faces unique health and safety challenges and is recognized by the National Institute for Occupational Safety and Health (NIOSH) as a priority industry sector in the National Occupational Research Agenda (NORA) to identify and provide intervention strategies regarding occupational health and safety issues.

== In laboratories ==
A laboratory-acquired infection (LAI) is an infection that is acquired in a laboratory, usually as part of a medical research facility or hospital. There are various microbes, viruses, fungi, and parasites that can infect a host via several routes of transmission.

Laboratory facilities handling microbes, viruses and/or parasites adhere to various biosecurity measures in order to prevent biosecurity accidents and incidents.

In 2001, experts from OECD countries created a consensus report called, calling upon "national governments to undertake actions to bring the BRC concept into being in concert with the international scientific community". The report details "Biological Resource Centres" (BRCs) as "repositories and providers of high-quality biological materials and information".
