= Workplace Safety and Health Act =

Statute of the Parliament of Singapore

The Workplace Safety and Health Act 2006 is an act issued by the Republic of Singapore. It addresses requirements for safety and health in workplaces, and replaced the Factories Act as of 1 March 2006.

== The Occupational Safety and Health Framework ==
The Occupational Safety and Health (OSH) framework aims to cultivate good safety habits in all individuals, so as to create a strong safety culture at the workplace.

The new framework is guided by the following principles:

- Reducing risks at the source by requiring all stakeholders to eliminate or minimise the risks they create;
- Instilling greater ownership of safety and health outcomes within the industries; and
- Preventing accidents through higher penalties for compromises in safety management.

== The Workplace Safety and Health Act ==
The Workplace Safety and Health Act (WSHA) is the key legislation affecting the principles of the OSH framework.

The WSHA emphasises the importance of managing Workplace Safety and Health (WSH) proactively, by requiring stakeholders to take reasonably practicable measures that ensure the safety and health of all individuals affected in the course of work.

The WSHA replaces the Factories Act. The key reforms under the WSHA include:

- Allowing for a gradual increase in scope to cover all workplaces;
- Assigning responsibilities to a range of stakeholders at the workplace along lines of control;
- Focusing more on WSH systems and outcomes;
- Providing for more effective enforcement through the issuance of "remedial orders"; and
- Providing for higher penalties for non-compliant and risk-taking behaviour, to prevent accidents at the source.

== Workplace Safety and Health Act Subsidiary Legislation ==
- WSH (Workplace Safety and Health Officers) Regulations
- WSH (General Provisions) Regulations
- WSH (Construction) Regulations 2007
- WSH (First Aid) Regulations
- WSH (Incident Reporting) Regulations
- WSH (Risk Management) Regulations
- WSH (Exemption) Order
- WSH (Composition of Offences) Regulations
- WSH (Transitional Provision) Regulations
- WSH (Offences and Penalties) (Subsidiary Legislation under Section 67(14)) Regulations
- WSH (Registration of Factories) Regulations 2008
- WSH (Shipbuilding and Ship-repairing) Regulations 2008
- WSH (Workplace Safety and Health Committees) Regulations 2008
- WSH (Abrasive Blasting) Regulations 2008
- WSH (Safety and Health Management system and Auditing) Regulations 2009
- WSH (Confined Spaces) Regulations 2009
- WSH (Noise) Regulations 2011
- WSH (Medical Examinations) Regulations 2011
- WSH (Operation of Cranes) Regulations 2011
- WSH (Scaffolds) Regulations 2011
- WSH (Work at Heights) Regulations
- WSH (Asbestos) Regulations 2014
- WSH (Explosive Powered Tools) Regulations 2009
- WSH (Design for Safety) Regulations 2015
- WSH (Major Hazards Installations) Regulations 2017
