= Principles of motion economy =

Set of rules and suggestions to improve the manual work in manufacturing

The principles of motion economy form a set of rules and suggestions to improve the manual work in manufacturing and reduce fatigue and unnecessary movements by the worker, which can lead to the reduction in the work related trauma.

== Categories ==
The principles of motion economy can be classified into four groups:

1. Principles related to the use of human body,
2. Principles related to the arrangement of the work place,
3. Principles related to the design of tools and equipment.
4. Principles related to time conservation.

=== Use of human body ===
- The two hands should begin motions at the same time.
- The two hands should not be idle at the same time except during rest periods.
- Motions of the arms should be made in opposite and symmetrical directions and should be made simultaneously
- Hand motions should be confined to the lowest classification with which it is possible to perform the work satisfactorily:

1. Finger motions
2. Wrist motions
3. Forearm motions
4. Upper arm motions
5. Shoulder motions

- Momentum should be employed to assist the worker whenever possible, and it should be reduced to a minimum if it must be overcome by muscular effort.
- Smooth continuous motions of the hands are preferable to zigzag motions or straight-line motions involving sudden and sharp changes in direction.
- Ballistic (i.e. free swinging) movements are faster, easier and more accurate than restricted or controlled movements.

=== Arrangement of the work place ===
- There should be a definite and fixed place for all tools and materials.
- Tools, materials, and controls should be located close in and directly in front of the operator.
- Drop delivers should be used whenever possible.
- Materials and tools should be located to permit the best sequence of motions.
- Arrange the height of the workplace and chair for alternate sitting and standing, when possible.
- Provide a chair of the type and height to permit good posture.

=== Design of tools and equipment ===
- Combine tools whenever possible.
- Preposition tools and materials.
- Where each finger performs some specific movement, the load should be distributed in accordance with the inherent capacities of the fingers.
- For light assembly, a screwdriver handle should be smaller at the bottom.
- Momentum should be used to help the worker in doing their task not to increase their task.g

=== Time conservation ===
- Even a temporary delay of work by a man or machine should not be encouraged.
- Machine should not run idle, it is not desirable that a lathe machine is running and its job is rotating but no cut is being taken.
- Two or more jobs should be worked upon at the same time or two or more operations should be carried out on a job simultaneously if possible.
- Number of motion involved in completing a job should be minimized.
