= Worksafe (Western Australia) =

Government agency in Western Australia

WorkSafe is an agency within the Department of Local Government, Industry Regulation and Safety, which is part of the Government of Western Australia, and responsible for the administration of the Occupational Safety and Health Act 1984. There are also agencies in other states of Australia, and at a national level with similar names and objectives.

The principal objective of the act and the division is to secure the safety and health of people in the workplace.

== Overview ==
WorkSafe is part of the Department of Local Government, Industry Regulation and Safety in Western Australia. They are responsible for the administration and enforcement of workplace health and safety legislation, as well as ensuring the safe storage, handling, and transport of dangerous goods. They administer the Work Health and Safety Act 2020 (WHS Act) and the Dangerous Goods Safety Act 2004 (DGS Act).

The division consists of the following business and operational areas:

- Legal Services
- Regulatory Support
- WorkSafe Industrial and Regional
- WorkSafe Investigations
- WorkSafe Mines Safety
- WorkSafe Petroleum Safety and Dangerous Goods
- WorkSafe Service Industries and Specialists.

WorkSafe oversees the regulatory and policy requirements of workers' health and safety in the general industries, mining sector, petroleum and geothermal energy operations, safety legislation for dangerous goods and major hazard facilities.

The WorkSafe Commissioner, reporting to the Minister for Industrial Relations, is responsible for performing the functions and exercising the powers as the regulator under the WHS Act.

Sally North is the current WorkSafe Commissioner.

WorkSafe’s role is to drive workplace change through education, specialist advice and enforcement.

- Compliance and enforcement: WorkSafe ensures duty holders comply with the Work Health and Safety Act 2020 and the Dangerous Goods Safety Act 2004.
- Education and guidance: WorkSafe provides resources to employers and workers to help them manage risks and adopt safe work practices. These resources are available both on the WorkSafe website and on the SafetyLine Hub.
- Inspections and investigations: WorkSafe inspectors and dangerous goods officers inspect workplaces, investigate incidents, and help identify hazards to prevent harm.
- Support for employers and workers: WorkSafe offers information and advice on health and safety systems and safe work practices.

WorkSafe’s collaborative approach is fostered through working with peak work health and safety bodies including the Work Health and Safety Commission and the Mining and Petroleum Advisory Committee. These peak bodies include representatives of employers, unions and WHS experts, collectively influencing workplace environments and building industry capacity to deliver strong WHS performance.

== Legislation ==
=== Work health and safety laws ===
The Occupational Health and Safety Act 1984 was repealed on 31 March 2022 and replaced by the Work Health and Safety Act 2020 aligning Western Australia’s laws with the national model WHS laws adopted by most other Australian jurisdictions.

The Work Health and Safety Act 2020 is supported by three sets of regulations.

- Work Health and Safety (General) Regulations 2022

Applies to all workplaces except those covered by the other two sets of regulations or those in the Commonwealth jurisdiction

- Work Health and Safety (Mines) Regulations 2022

Applies to mining and mineral exploration operations

- Work Health and Safety (Petroleum and Geothermal Energy Operations) Regulations 2022

Applies to onshore and offshore petroleum, pipeline and geothermal energy operations within Western Australia’s state jurisdiction

=== Dangerous goods safety laws ===
WorkSafe administers seven pieces of legislation relating to the manufacture, storage, handling, transport, and use of dangerous goods, including explosives and non-explosives:

This includes the operation of major hazard facilities across Western Australia.

- Dangerous Goods Safety Act 2004
- Dangerous Goods Safety (General) Regulations 2007
- Dangerous Goods Safety (Storage and Handling of Non-explosives) Regulations 2007
- Dangerous Goods Safety (Major Hazard Facilities) Regulations 2007
- Dangerous Goods Safety (Road and Rail Transport of Non-Explosives) Regulations 2007
- Dangerous Goods Safety (Explosives) Regulations 2007
- Dangerous Goods Safety (Security Sensitive Ammonium Nitrate) Regulations 2007

== Strategic direction ==
WorkSafe’s strategic plan, The way forward 2023-24 to 2025-26, is a high-level, three-year rolling strategy that describes the goals, priority areas and measures of success for health and safety actions undertaken by WorkSafe.

The four key priorities are:

- Repeat hazard exposure
- Psychosocial hazards
- Respiratory hazards
- Consultation and representation.

The strategy aims to influence industry practices and reduce workplace harm beyond regulatory enforcement. It aligns with Safe Work Australia’s Australian Work Health and Safety Strategy 2023–2033.

WorkSafe's overarching goals for the period of 2023-24 to 2025-26.

- To reduce work-related fatalities by ten per cent and reduce the incidence of serious injuries and illnesses by seven per cent over the three-year period.
- To minimise the number of dangerous goods incidents, by ensuring dangerous goods are used and transported safely.

== Programs and initiatives ==
=== ThinkSafe. WorkSafe. ===
The ThinkSafe. WorkSafe. campaign was launched in 2024 to improve work practices to achieve better health and safety outcomes for workers. It is also to reinforce the importance of health and safety for every worker. The campaign supports basic risk management messages that focus on harm reduction and changing behaviour at the individual or organisational level.

=== Safe Work Month ===
Each October, WorkSafe participates in Safe Work Month, a national event led by Safe Work Australia. The campaign encourages workplaces to commit to creating a healthy and safe workplace. Throughout the month, events and industry forums are held to boost engagement, raise awareness, and encourage everyone to make health and safety a priority.

WorkSafe also hosts the Work Health and Safety Excellence Awards during the month, to recognise individuals and organisations for their outstanding contributions to workplace safety and innovation.

=== Mental Awareness, Respect and Safety (MARS) Program ===
The MARS Program is an inter-agency collaboration launched in December 2021, involving the Department of Local Government, Industry Regulation and Safety (LGIRS), the Mental Health Commission, the Equal Opportunity Commission and the Department of Communities.

MARS Program works with the mining industry to drive positive cultural change and take meaningful action towards identifying and responding to psychosocial issues and other WHS issues.

=== WorkSafe SmartMove ===
WorkSafe SmartMove is an online program that teaches work health and safety to new and young workers. Created by WorkSafe Western Australia, it is aimed at senior high school students and young people starting work through placements, work experience, or school-based traineeships and apprenticeships. The program began in December 1998 as part of the SafetyLine Online initiative.

SmartMove helps participants spot workplace hazards, assess risks, and use safe practices to stay healthy and safe at work. The program offers certificate modules for different industries and includes sessions on new workplace hazards. About 92% of senior high schools in Western Australia use the program each year.
