= Right to sit =

Policies granting the right to be granted suitable seating at work

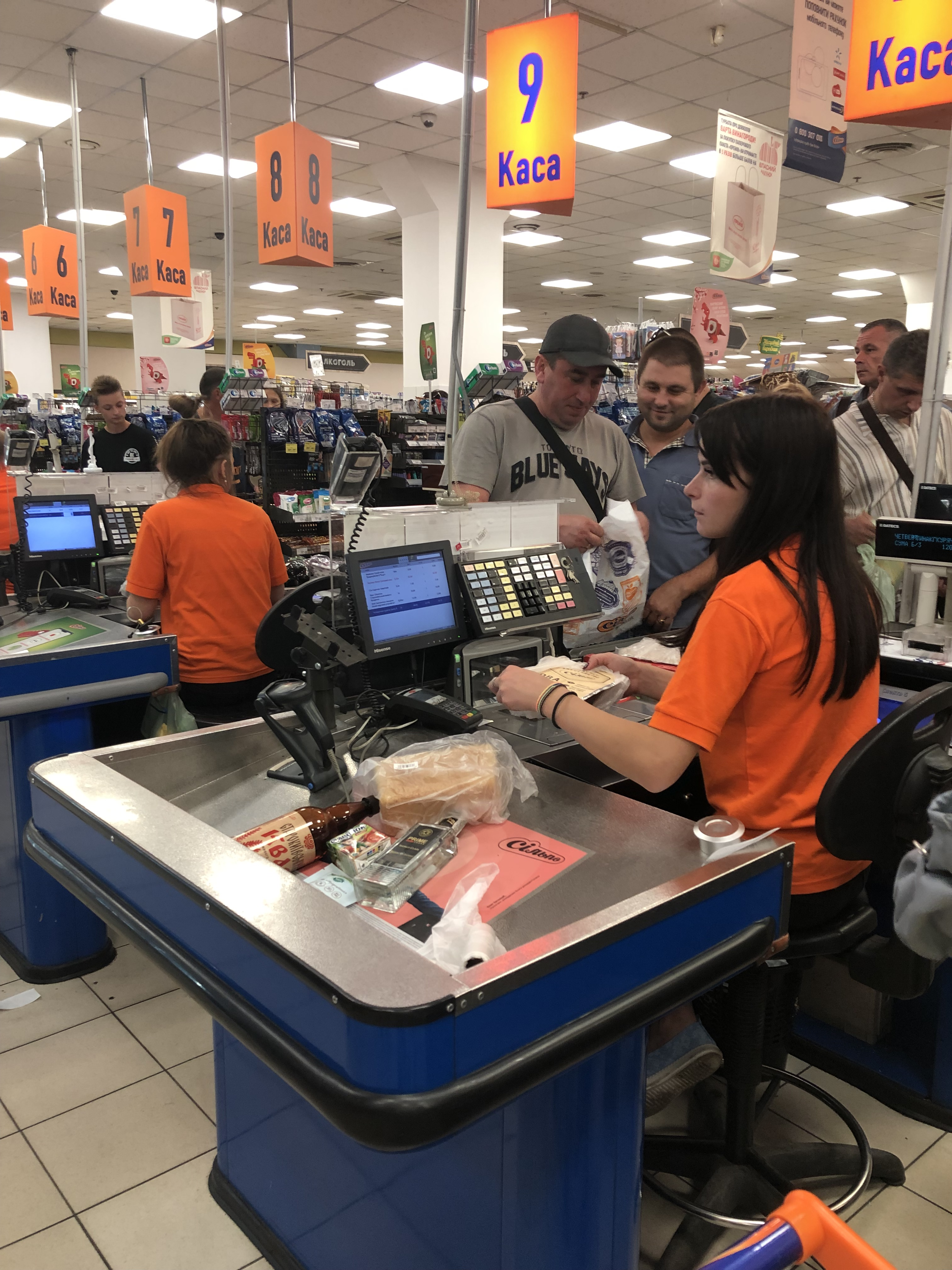
Seated cashiers at a supermarket in Ukraine, July 2019.

The right to sit, also known as suitable seating, refers to laws or policies granting workers the right to be given seating at the workplace. Jurisdictions that have enshrined "right to sit" laws or policies include Austria, Japan, Germany, Mexico, France, Spain, Argentina, the United Kingdom, Jamaica, South Africa, Eswatini, Cameroon, Tanzania, Uganda, Lesotho, Malaysia, Brazil, Israel, Ireland, Zambia, Guyana, the Indian states of Tamil Nadu and Kerala, and the British overseas territories of Gibraltar and Montserrat. Almost all states of the United States and Australia, as well as the majority of Canadian provinces, passed right to sit legislation for women workers between 1881 and 1917. US states with current, gender-neutral right to sit legislation include California, Florida, Massachusetts, Montana, New Jersey, Oregon, and Wisconsin.

A right to sit provision is included in the International Labour Organization's Hygiene (Commerce and Offices) Convention, 1964; the international treaty being ratified by 52 countries as of 2023. EU-OSHA recommends suitable seating as a best practice. Local jurisdictions with right to sit laws include Ann Arbor, Michigan; St. Louis, Missouri; and London's Royal Borough of Kensington and Chelsea.

Some jurisdictions have revoked their right to sit laws, including Quebec, Washington, D.C., the majority of US states, and some cities such as Baltimore, Chicago, and Portland. Many right to sit laws originally contained gendered language specifying women workers only. Some jurisdictions maintain gendered laws, such as Belize and Trinidad and Tobago, but many jurisdictions have amended their right to sit laws to be gender neutral. Jurisdictions without general right to sit laws often grant seating to disabled, pregnant, or minor workers as a reasonable accommodation. In some workplaces, unionized workers have gained suitable seating provisions in their work contracts as part of collective bargaining. The right to stand may also be protected in some jurisdictions, especially for workers with a sitting disability.

== About ==
National right to sit laws. Right to sit laws at the state, provincial, or local levels. Ratification of the Hygiene (Commerce and Offices) Convention, 1964. Law repealed.

Right to sit laws have been enacted in some form in countries in Africa, Asia, Europe, North America, South America, and Oceania. Cashiers typically sit down while working in many European countries, where right to sit laws are common. This is partly because many large European retail chains let customers bag their own groceries rather than have the cashier do the bagging.

The German supermarket chain Aldi allows cashiers to sit while attending to their registers, in accordance with German labor law. In jurisdictions without right to sit laws, Aldi still allows their workers to sit down not because of concern for worker health or comfort, but rather due to research which suggests that workers who are allowed to sit down are more productive and efficient.

American corporations have strongly opposed right to sit laws. According to John Logan, the director of Labor and Employment Studies at San Francisco State University, corporate opposition to these laws is "about maintaining unilateral control of the workplace" and maintaining "flexibility" for owners to do what they want.

Some labor unions have demanded suitable seating provisions in worker contracts as part of collective bargaining negotiations.

== By jurisdiction ==
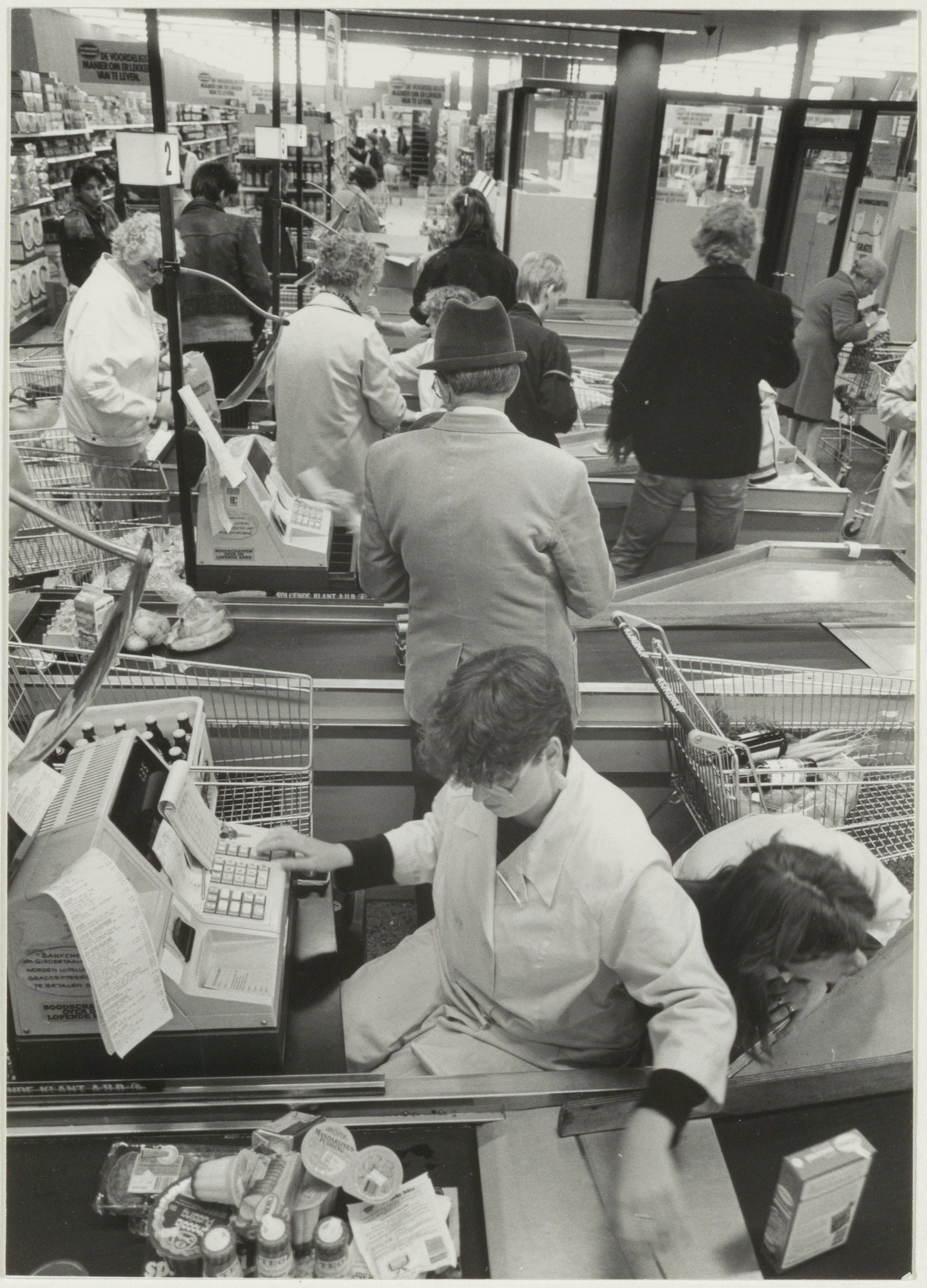
Seated cashiers at a supermarket in the Netherlands, June 1985

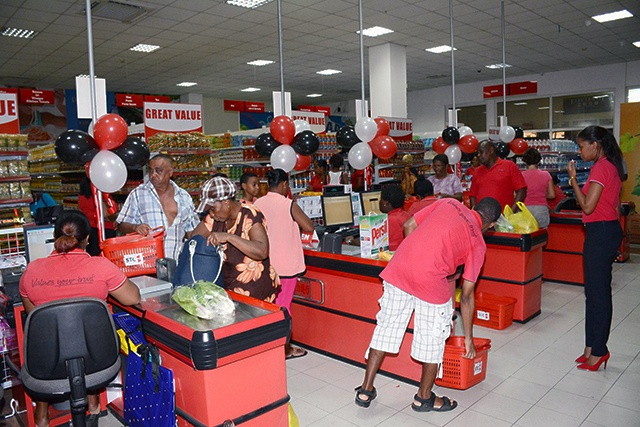
Seated cashiers at a supermarket in Seychelles, February 2020.

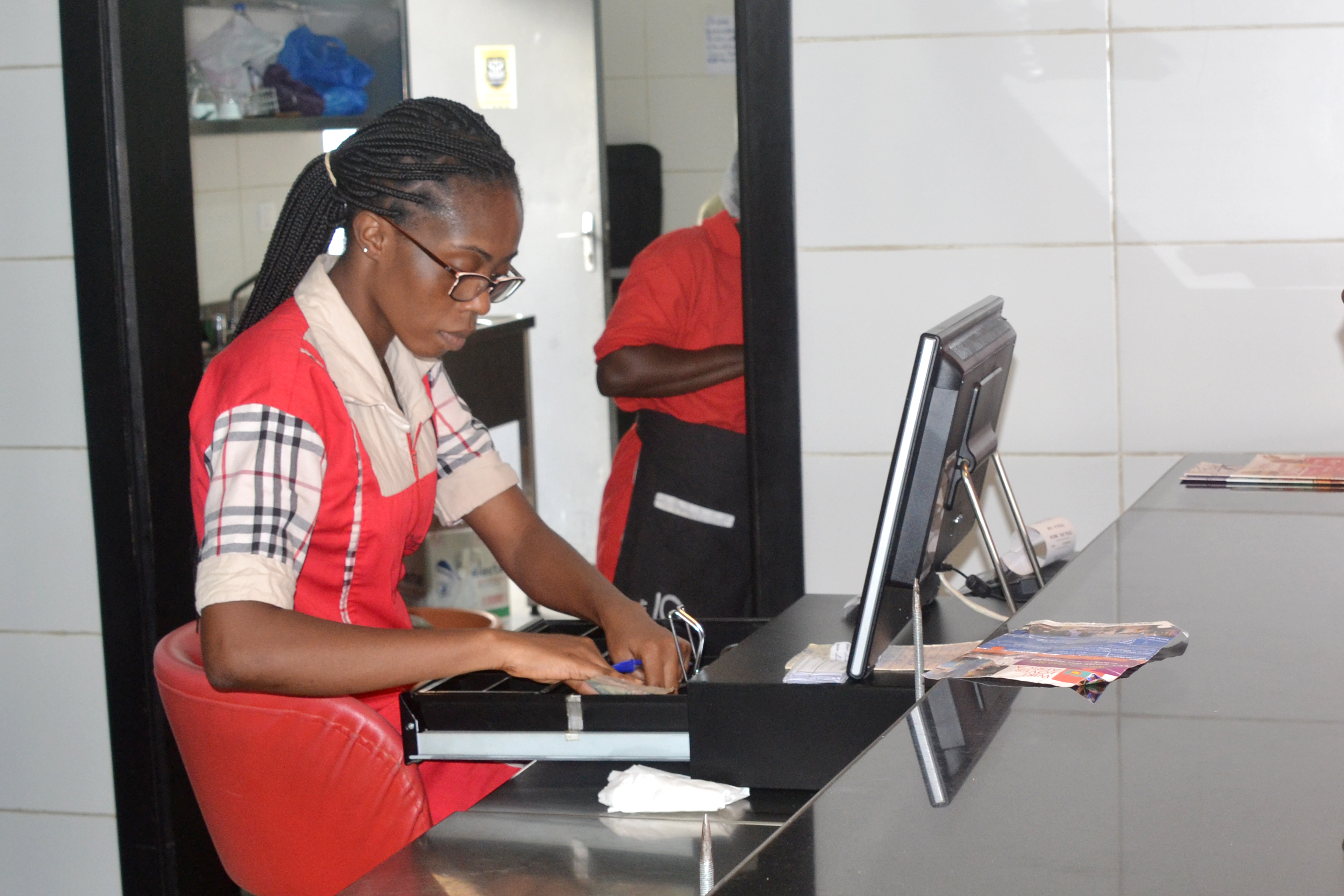
A seated restaurant worker in Ivory Coast, October 2017.

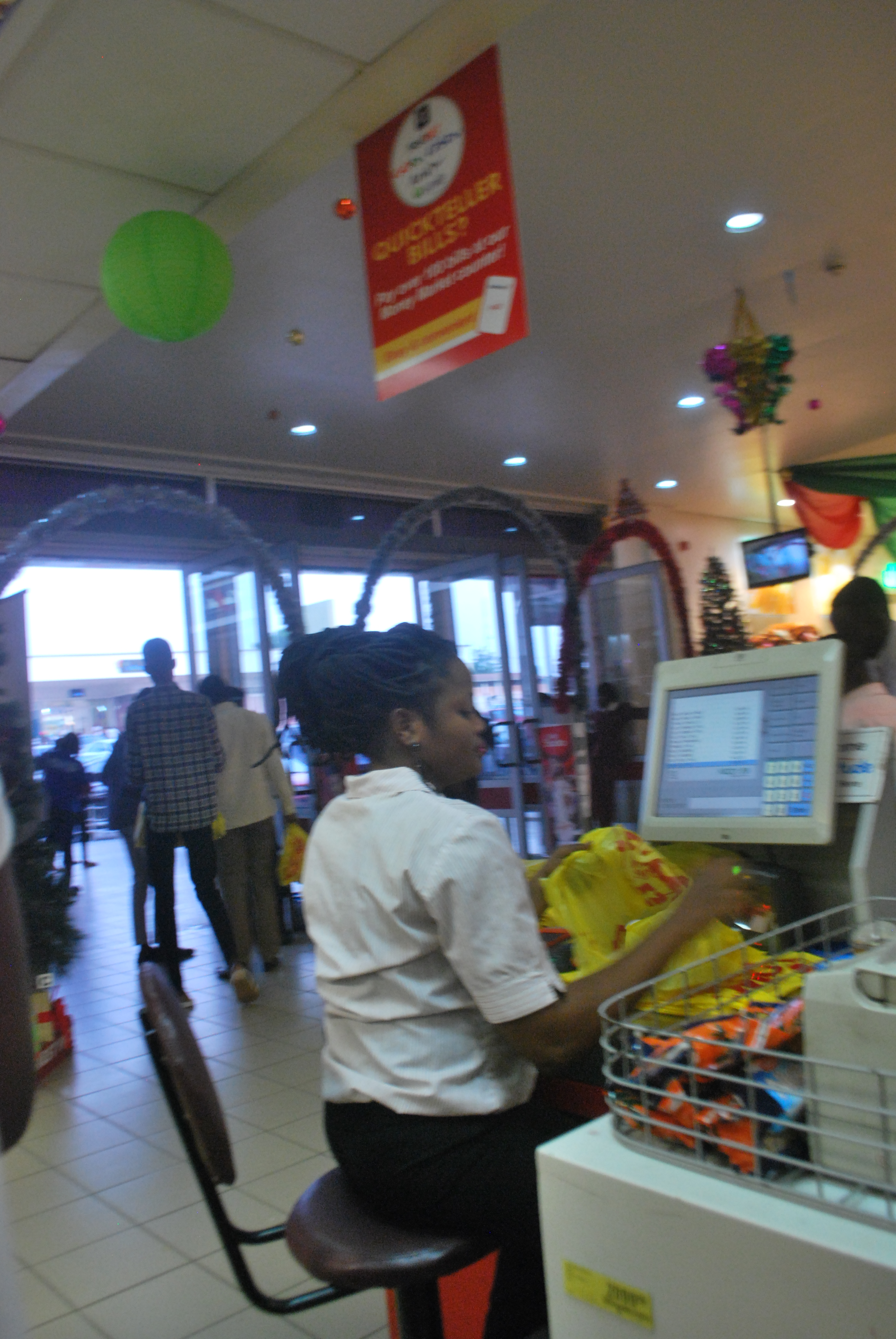
A seated cashier at a grocery store in Nigeria, November 2017.

In much of Europe it is the norm for cashiers to sit while working, whereas prolonged standing while working is the norm in most of North America, Asia, and Australia.

=== European Union ===
The European Agency for Safety and Health at Work has suitable seating requirements in Directive 89/391/EEC.

=== International law ===
Article 14 of the International Labour Organization's Hygiene (Commerce and Offices) Convention, 1964 establishes that "[s]ufficient and suitable seats shall be supplied for workers and workers shall be given reasonable opportunities of using them." This United Nations convention has been ratified by 52 states as of 2023. The law entered into force on 29 March 1966.

=== Algeria ===
Algeria ratified the International Labour Organization's Hygiene (Commerce and Offices) Convention, 1964 on 12 June 1969.

=== Anguilla ===
The Shops Regulation Act of Anguilla grants suitable seating to female workers, stating that "The owner or occupier of any shop to which this Act applies in which female shop assistants are employed shall at all times provide and keep therein a sufficient number of suitable seats or chairs for the use of such female shop assistants and shall permit them to use such seats or chairs when not necessarily engaged in the work or duty for which they are employed."

=== Antigua and Barbuda ===
Chapter 400 of Antigua and Barbuda's Shops Regulation Act grants suitable seating to female workers, stating that "The owner or occupier of any shop to which this Act applies in which female shop assistants are employed shall at all times provide and keep therein a sufficient number of suitable seats or chairs for the use of such female shop assistants and shall permit them to use such seats or chairs when not necessarily engaged in the work or duty for which they are employed."

=== Argentina ===
Argentina passed a suitable seating law in 1935 stating that all workers must be provided chairs with backrests, provided that the job can be reasonably performed while seated.

=== Azerbaijan ===
Azerbaijan ratified the International Labour Organization's Hygiene (Commerce and Offices) Convention, 1964 on 19 May 1992.

=== Australia ===
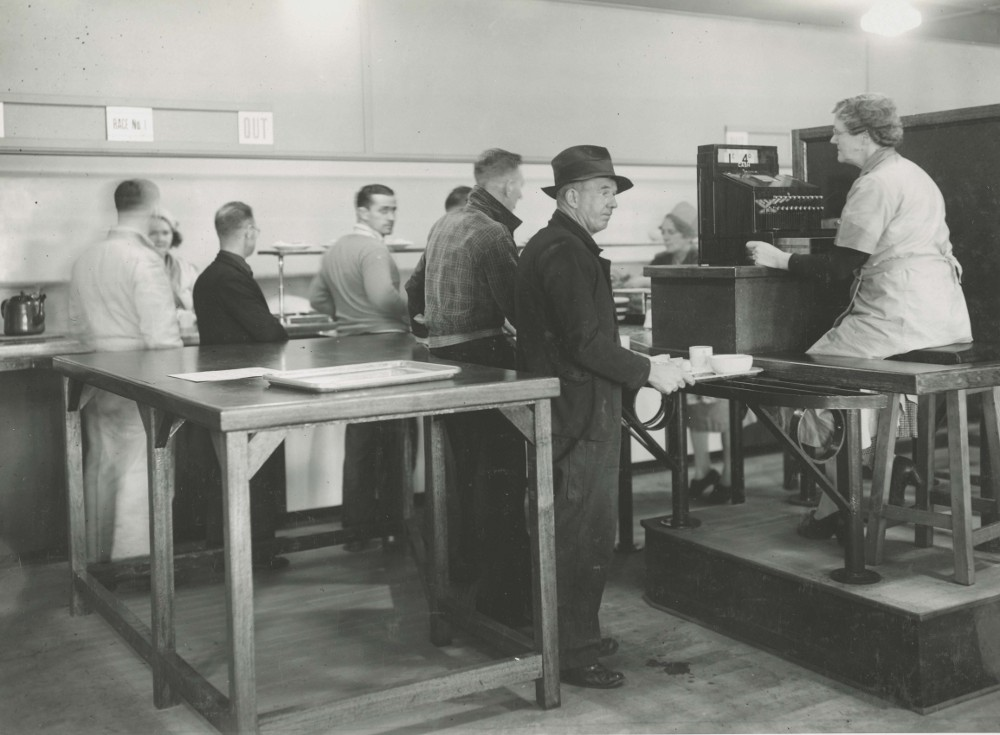
Seated cashier at a cafeteria in Australia, May 1944.

Along with New Zealand, 49 of the 50 states of the United States, and most Canadian provinces, the majority of Australian states passed right to sit legislation during the late 1800s and early 1900s.

According to Safe Work Australia, an Australian government agency, "Too much sitting or standing is bad for your health. Prolonged standing can increase risk of fatigue and illness. Workers should not stay in a seated, standing or static posture for long periods. Persons conducting a business or undertaking have a duty to keep workers safe from the risks of excessive sitting and standing." The agency recommends that employers provide their workers with a "chair, stool or support, so they can alternate between sitting and standing" or "a footrest large enough for the whole foot, so they can stand with either foot raised."

==== New South Wales ====
New South Wales passed a right to sit law in the 1890s.

As of 2008, the right to sit law in New South Wales stated that "When requested by employees and where practicable, suitable seats shall be provided by the employer for employees."

==== Queensland ====
Queensland passed a right to sit law in the 1890s.

==== South Australia ====
In 1896, South Australian MP King O'Malley unsuccessfully introduced the "Seating in Shops Bill" requiring seats to be provided for shop assistants.

==== Victoria ====
The state of Victoria had a right to sit law for women workers in 1956, for those working in clothing manufacturing. The law stated that "[w]hen requested by employees, and where practicable, suitable seats shall be provided by the employer for female employees in positions handy to their work."

==== Western Australia ====
Western Australia passed a right to sit law on December 16, 1899.

=== Austria ===
Austria's General Employee Protection Ordinance includes a right to sit provision. Enacted in 1995, the law states that "For work that is permanent or [where] temporary sitting can be performed, work seats must be made available to employees at the workplace. If, for operational reasons, work seats cannot be set up or used directly at the workplace, even though the work processes and procedures permit temporary sitting, seats must be provided near the workstations."

=== Belarus ===
The Byelorussian Soviet Socialist Republic ratified the International Labour Organization's Hygiene (Commerce and Offices) Convention, 1964 on 26 Feb 1968.

=== Belgium ===
Belgium ratified the International Labour Organization's Hygiene (Commerce and Offices) Convention, 1964 on 17 May 1978.

=== Belize ===
Belize's Shops Act, Chapter 287, states that women workers have a right to suitable seating. The law states that "The occupier of every shop in which female shop assistants are employed shall at all times provide and keep...chairs or other suitable accommodation behind the counter or in such other position as may be suitable for the purpose for the sole use of such female shop assistants in the proportion of not less than one chair or other seating accommodation to every three females employed and shall permit them to make use of such chairs or other seating accommodation when they are not necessarily engaged in the work or duty for which they are employed..."

=== Bolivia ===
Bolivia ratified the International Labour Organization's Hygiene (Commerce and Offices) Convention, 1964 on 31 January 1977.

=== Brazil ===
In Brazil, Article 199 of the Consolidation of Labor Laws mandates the placement of seats that assure a worker's right posture, capable of avoiding uncomfortable or forceful positions, whenever the task demands the worker to be seated. This same article has a single paragraph stating, furthermore, that when a worker performs a task standing, seats will be made available during the existing resting periods.

Brazil ratified the International Labour Organization's Hygiene (Commerce and Offices) Convention, 1964 on 24 March 1969.

=== Bulgaria ===
Bulgaria ratified the International Labour Organization's Hygiene (Commerce and Offices) Convention, 1964 on 29 March 1965.

=== Cameroon ===
Cameroon's right to sit law states that "There shall be provided suitable seats for the use of workers whose work is carried while sitting continuously or intermittently." The law was passed in 1984.

=== Canada ===
Right to sit law active. Law repealed.

There is no right to sit provision under Canadian federal law. At least nine of the ten Canadian provinces and two of the three territories have passed right to sit legislation at some point: Alberta, British Columbia, Manitoba, New Brunswick, Newfoundland and Labrador, Nova Scotia, Ontario, Northwest Territories, Nunavut, Quebec, and Saskatchewan.

Right to sit laws have been repealed in Alberta, British Columbia, New Brunswick and Quebec. Right to sit laws are active in the provinces of Newfoundland and Labrador and Saskatchewan. Nunavut and Northwest Territories both have active right to sit laws.

==== Alberta ====
Alberta's Factories Act of 1922 granted suitable seating to female workers. The act was replaced by the Factories Act of 1942, which also contains a suitable seating provision for female workers. the 1942 act was replaced by the Factories Act of 1955, which contained no suitable seating provision.

==== British Columbia ====
British Columbia's Factories Act, 1966, provided that if an Inspector can determine that "the whole or a substantial portion of the work upon which female employees are engaged in a factory can be efficiently performed while such employees are seated, the employer shall, forthwith upon being required to do so by the Inspector in writing, provide such seats as may be directed by the Inspector." The Factories Act was repealed and replaced by the Workplace Act in 1985, which contained no suitable seating provisions.

==== Manitoba ====
In 1888, Manitoba passed the Shops Regulation Act, the highlight of which was "the requirement for employers to provide a sufficient number of suitable seats or chairs for the use of their female employees who shall be permitted to use the same when not necessarily engaged in their work or duty."

==== New Brunswick ====
In 1916, the Statutes of New Brunswick were amended to grant the right to sit for female workers. New Brunswick's Factory Acts of 1946 and 1952 granted suitable seating for all employees regardless of sex. The 1952 Factory Act was repealed on November 18, 1974.

==== Nova Scotia ====
In Nova Scotia, the Statutes of 1912 granted suitable seating to women workers. The law stated that "Every employer shall at all times provide and keep in the shop occupied by him a sufficient and suitable seat or chair for the use of every female employed in such shop, and shall permit her to use such seat or chair when not necessarily engaged in the work or duty for which she is employed in such shop..."

==== Newfoundland and Labrador ====
The Newfoundland and Labrador Regulation 2012 states that employers in Newfoundland and Labrador must guarantee that a "worker in the course of his or her work has a reasonable opportunity to sit without detriment to his or her work, an employer shall provide and maintain suitable seating for the worker's use to enable him or her to take advantage of that opportunity." The law further states that seating must be "suitably designed, constructed, dimensioned and supported for the worker to do the work, including, where necessary, a footrest that can readily and comfortably support the feet." If standing during work is necessary, the employer must "provide an antifatigue mat, footrest or other suitable device to provide relief."

==== Northwest Territories ====
Occupational Health and Safety Regulations of Northwest Territories states that "If there is a reasonable opportunity for a worker to work while seated without substantially detracting from the work, an employer shall provide and maintain (a) a seat that is suitably designed, constructed, dimensioned and supported for the worker to do the work; and (b) if needed, a footrest that can readily and comfortably support the worker’s feet."

==== Nunavut ====
Nunavut's Occupational Safety and Health Regulations states that "If there is a reasonable opportunity for a worker to work while seated without substantially detracting from the work, an employer shall provide and maintain...a seat that is suitably designed, constructed, dimensioned and supported for the worker to do the work; and (b) if needed, a footrest that can readily and comfortably support the worker's feet."

==== Ontario ====
Ontario passed a Shops Regulation Act in 1888, the same year that Manitoba passed similar legislation, the highlight of which included the right to sit for female workers. An 1891 report published by the University College, Toronto on "The Conditions of Female Labour" mentions that while the Shops Regulation Act protected women workers' right to sit, the law was "to a large extent, a dead letter...as there is no system of inspection under the Act." However, the report notes that some scattered attempts at enforcement had been made in Toronto. The report mentions that employers often would not let women workers sit down because they believed sitting gave "an appearance of dullness of trade." Given the lack of enforcement, the report recommended a system of inspection covering the whole province to effectively guarantee the right to sit.

Ontario's Revised Statutes of 1897 required seats for female workers.

The Revised Statutes of Ontario state that suitable seating must be provided in worker lunch rooms where lunch rooms are required.

==== Quebec ====
During the 1980s and 1990s, Article 11.7.1 of Quebec's "Regulation respecting industrial and commercial establishments" protected a worker's right to sit "where the nature of the work process allows it." In 1989, a middle-aged supermarket cashier with back pain filed a complaint after being denied the right to sit. A Quebec appeals tribunal ruled in favor of the cashier and her union in 1991. Article 11.7.1 was later revoked.

In 2017, a 71-year-old Costco worker in Sainte-Foy, Quebec City, was ordered by his employer to stand while working after he brought a bench to work. He was reprimanded again for leaning against a wall after his bench was prohibited. Stating that "We're not lazy, we're old", the worker insisted on his right to sit. His right to sit was only granted after multiple requests, with Costco demanding that he provide a medical note. After taking his case to upper management, the worker gained the right to sit exception for 15 other Costco workers.

==== Saskatchewan ====
Saskatchewan's Occupational Safety and Health Act, 2020 includes a right to sit provision. The act states that "If, in the course of their work, workers have reasonable opportunities for sitting without substantial detriment to their work, an employer or contractor shall provide and maintain for their use appropriate seating to enable the workers to sit."

=== Central African Republic ===
The Central African Republic ratified the International Labour Organization's Hygiene (Commerce and Offices) Convention, 1964 on 5 June 2006.

=== Chile ===
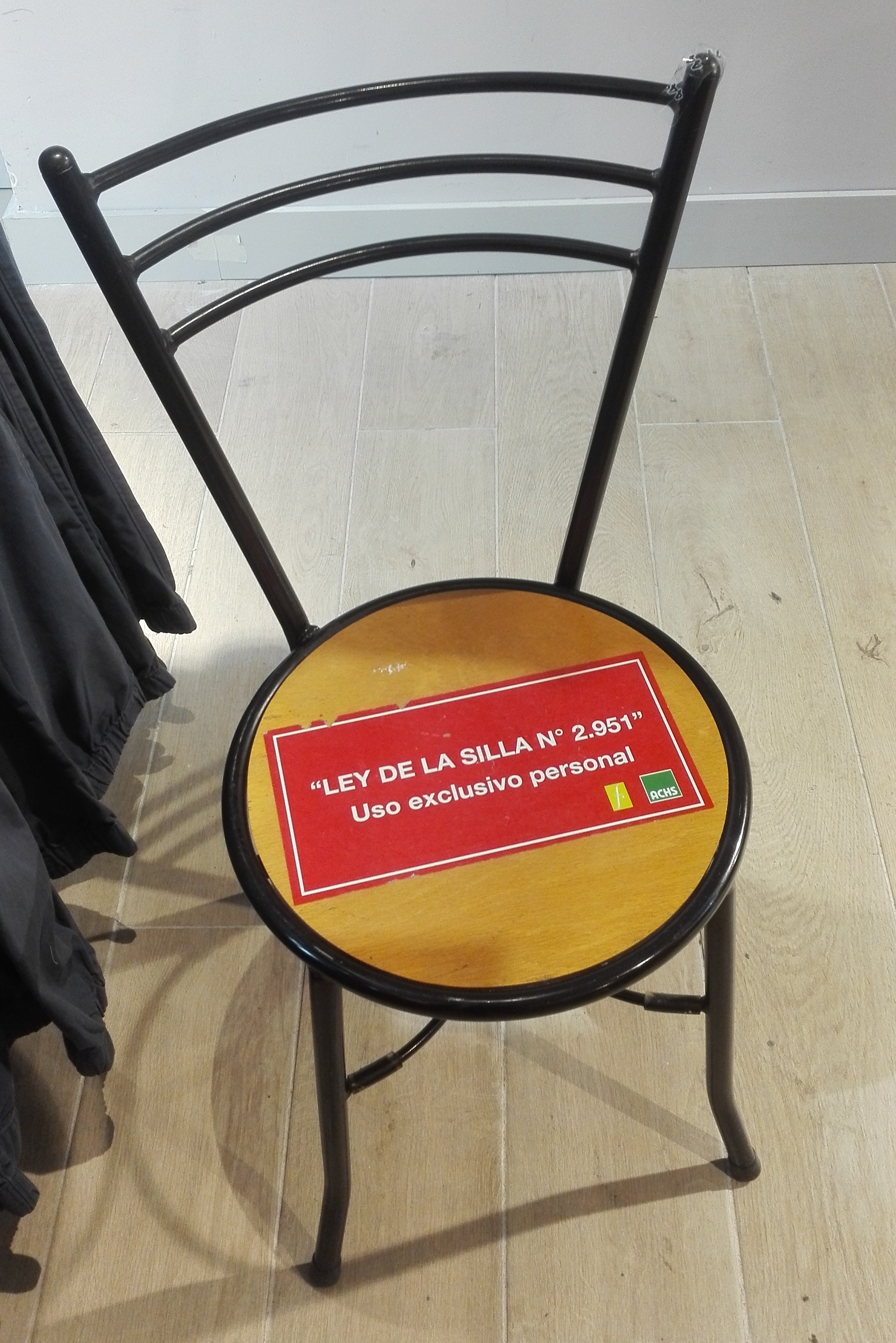
Chair intended for use by workers at a department store in Santiago, Chile.

Chile's "chair law" was enacted in 1914, during the administration of President Ramón Barros Luco. The chair law was one of the earliest successes of the Chilean labour movement. The original chair law no longer exists, but the text of Chile's current suitable seating law is found in Title I, Book II, Article 193 of the Chilean Labor Code of 1994.

=== China ===
==== Macau ====
The International Labour Organization's Hygiene (Commerce and Offices) Convention, 1964 has been applicable in Macau since December 20, 1999. The treaty has not yet been ratified in China, but is applicable in Macau due to the treaty's ratification when Macau was subject to Portuguese rule.

=== Comoros ===
Law No. 88-015/AF of the Labor Code of Comoros grants the right to suitable seating for workers.

=== Costa Rica ===
Costa Rica ratified the International Labour Organization's Hygiene (Commerce and Offices) Convention, 1964 on 27 January 1966.

=== Cuba ===
Cuba ratified the International Labour Organization's Hygiene (Commerce and Offices) Convention, 1964 on 5 February 1971.

=== Cyprus ===
In 2023, right to sit legislation was proposed in Cyprus by MP Giorgos Koukoumas of the Progressive Party of Working People. The bill was passed in October 2023, with 34 votes in favor. The bill was modeled after the best practices of the European Agency for Safety and Health at Work (EU-OSHA).

=== Czech Republic ===
The Czech Republic ratified the International Labour Organization's Hygiene (Commerce and Offices) Convention, 1964 on 1 January 1993.

=== Democratic Republic of the Congo ===
The Democratic Republic of the Congo ratified the International Labour Organization's Hygiene (Commerce and Offices) Convention, 1964 on 5 September 1967.

=== Denmark ===
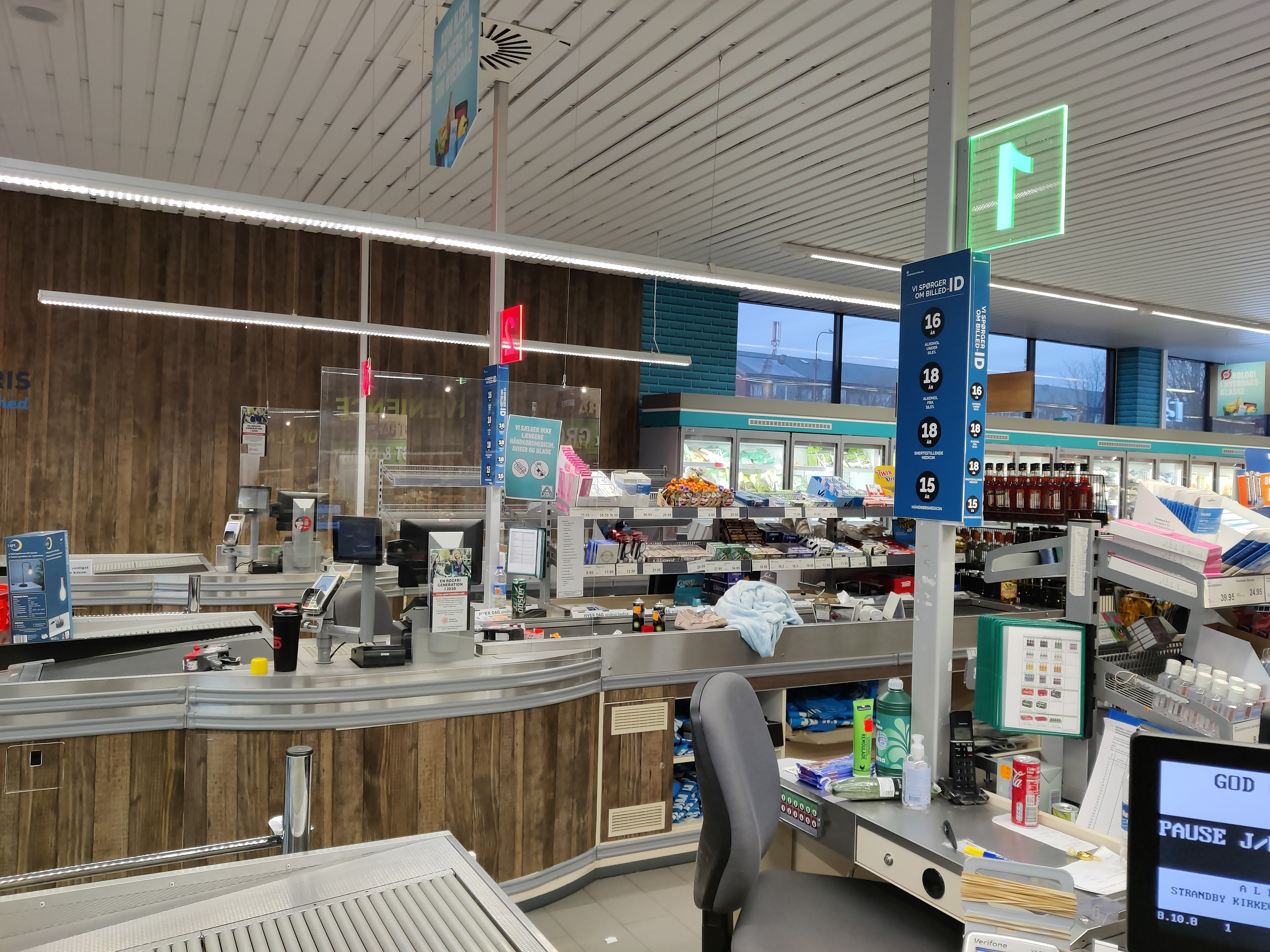
Chairs for cashiers at a supermarket in Denmark, April 2023.

Denmark ratified the International Labour Organization's Hygiene (Commerce and Offices) Convention, 1964 on 17 June 1970.

=== Djibouti ===
Djibouti ratified the International Labour Organization's Hygiene (Commerce and Offices) Convention, 1964 on 3 August 1978.

=== Ecuador ===
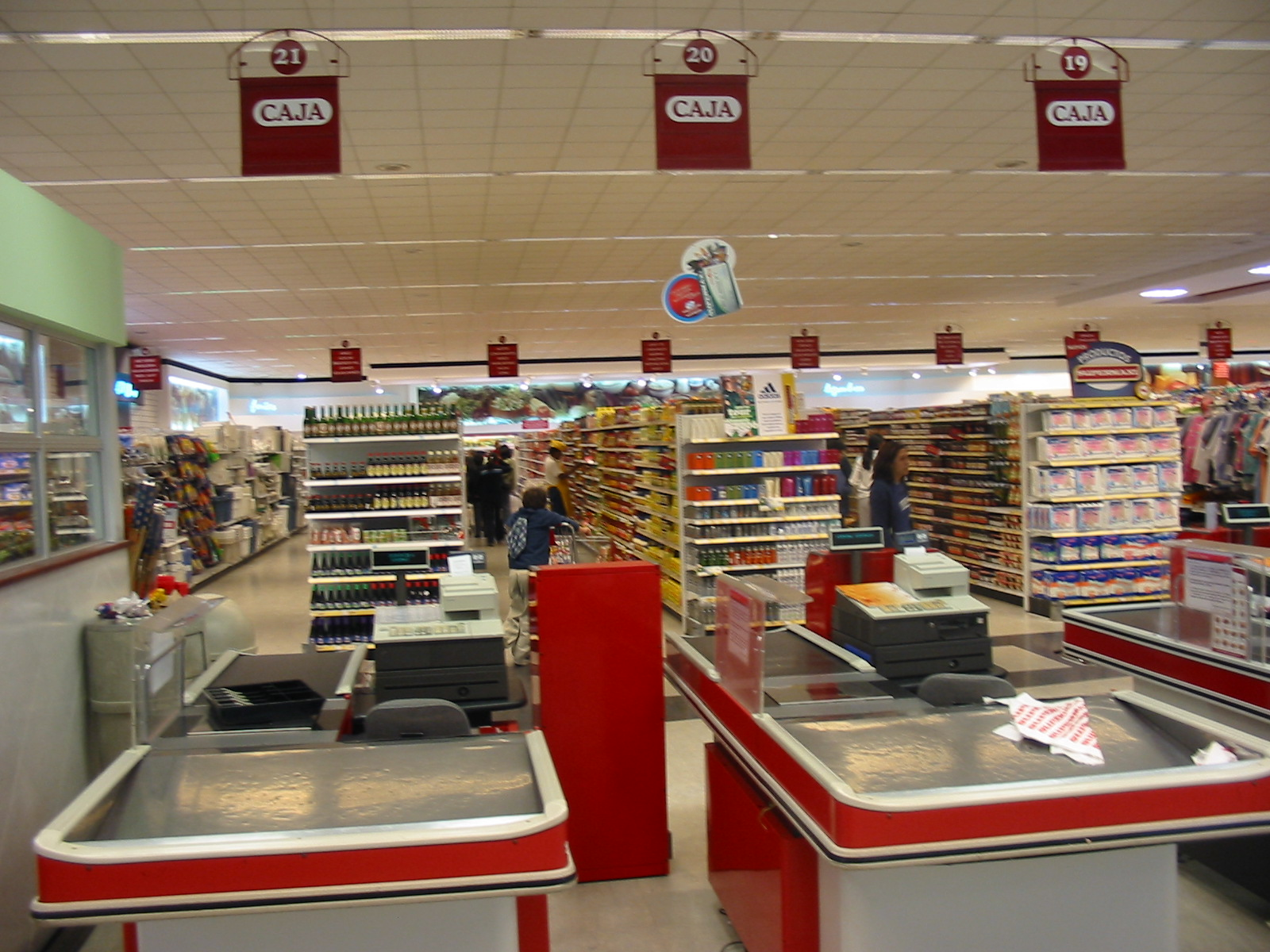
Chairs for cashiers at a supermarket in Ecuador, 2006.

Ecuador ratified the International Labour Organization's Hygiene (Commerce and Offices) Convention, 1964 on 10 March 1969.

=== Eswatini ===
Eswatini's Employment Act, 1980, guarantees a worker's right to sit. The act states that "[e]very employer shall, where a substantial proportion of the work being carried out by his employees can be carried out sitting, provide suitable seating for such employees."

=== Finland ===
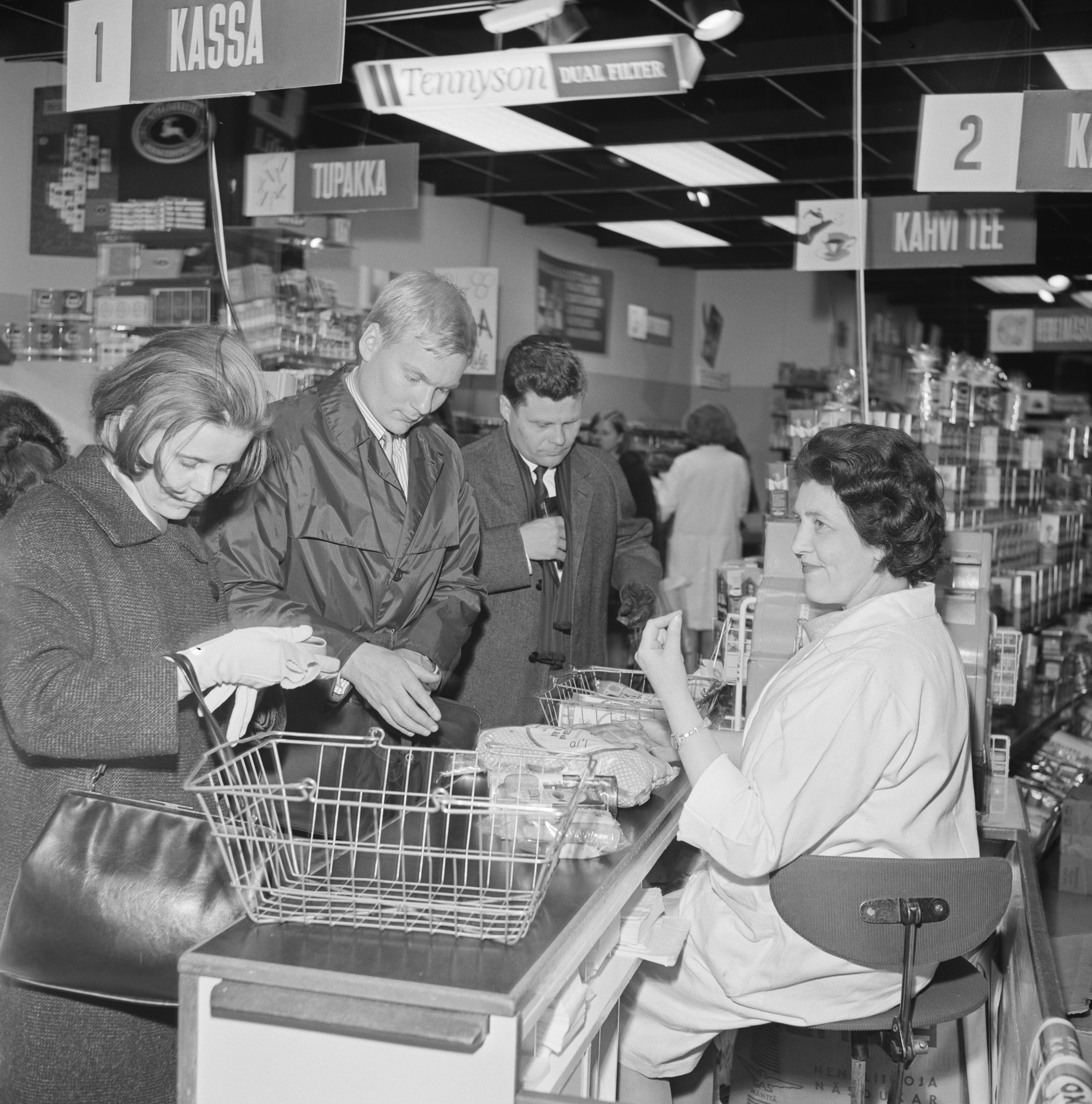
Seated cashier in Finland, 1965.

Finland ratified the International Labour Organization's Hygiene (Commerce and Offices) Convention, 1964 on 23 September 1968.

The Occupational Safety and Health Administration in Finland states that "If the work can be performed sitting down, seats must be provided. Seats are also needed to enable workers to take breaks."

=== France ===
France ratified the International Labour Organization's Hygiene (Commerce and Offices) Convention, 1964 on 6 April 1972.

French labour law states that suitable seats must be made available to each worker at or near their workstation.

=== Germany ===
Germany ratified the International Labour Organization's Hygiene (Commerce and Offices) Convention, 1964 on 5 December 1973.

Germany's right to sit ordinance states that "If the work can be performed wholly or in part when seated or if the working sequence permits occasional sitting, workers must be provided with seating facilities at the workstation. If it is not possible for operational reasons to provide seating facilities directly at the workstation, even though the working sequence permits occasional sitting, workers must be provided with seating facilities near the workstations."

=== Ghana ===
Ghana ratified the International Labour Organization's Hygiene (Commerce and Offices) Convention, 1964 on 21 November 1966.

=== Guatemala ===
Guatemala ratified the International Labour Organization's Hygiene (Commerce and Offices) Convention, 1964 on 21 October 1975.

=== Guinea ===
Guinea ratified the International Labour Organization's Hygiene (Commerce and Offices) Convention, 1964 on 12 December 1966.

=== Guyana ===
Guyana's Shops (Consolidation) Act states in Chapter 91:04 that the "occupier of a shop shall provide for the sole use of shop assistants seating accommodation" when suitable and that there should be no less than one chair for every three employees in a room.

=== India ===
Indian states with right to sit laws.

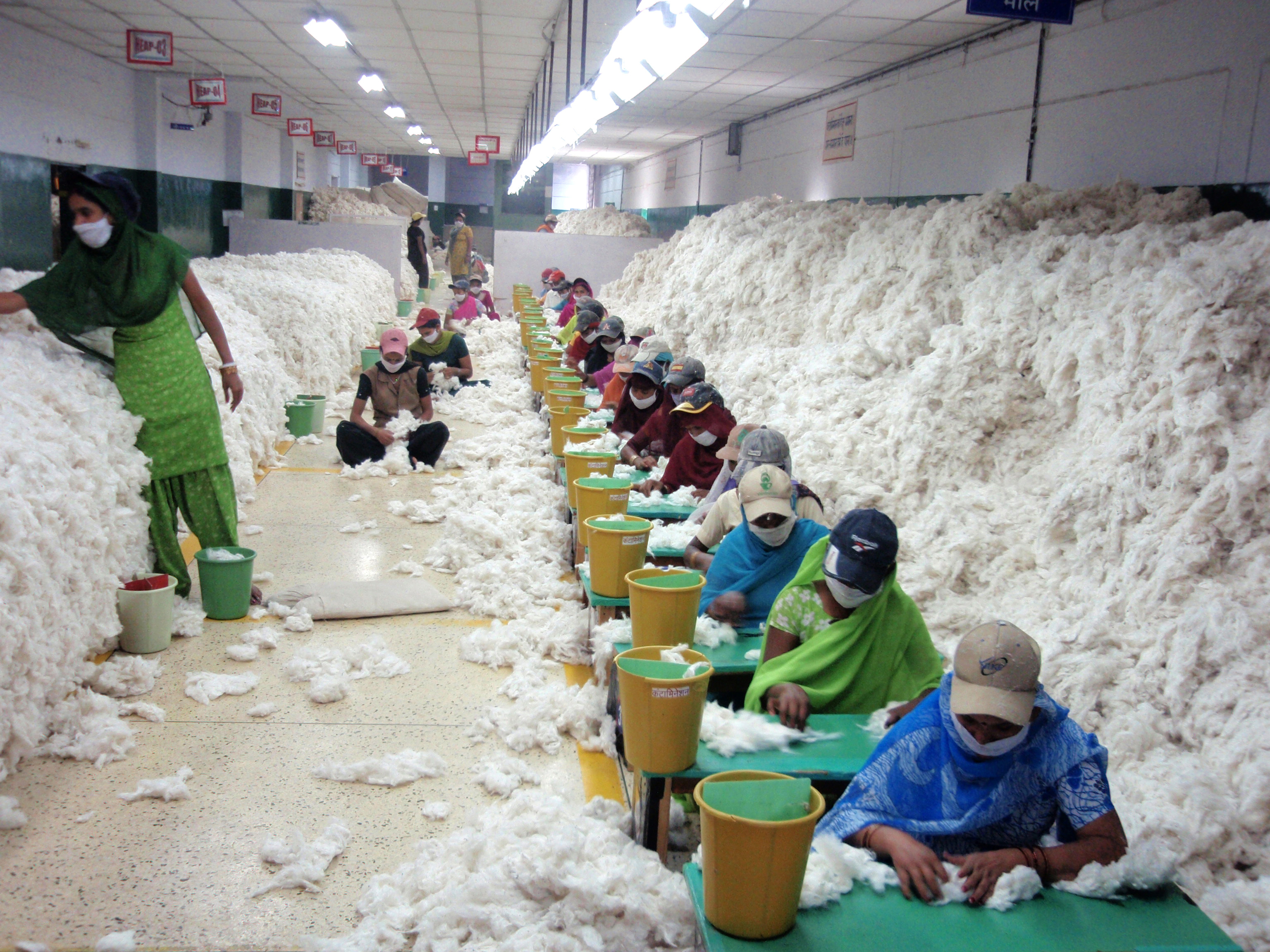
Seated workers at a cotton mill in India, February 2010.

The campaign to gain the right to sit in India has been led by working-class feminists, labor union organizers, and communists in South India, particularly in Kerala and Tamil Nadu. Two Indian states have passed right to sit laws as of 2021, with labor activists seeking a nationwide Indian right to sit law.

The Factories Act, 1948, contains a suitable seating provision for factory workers. In 1948, the law stated that "In every factory, suitable seating arrangements must be provided and maintained for all workers required to stand, so they can sit and take rest when opportunities arise during their work." As of 2024, the law states that "In every factory suitable arrangements for sitting shall be provided and maintained for all workers obliged to work in a standing position, in order that they may take advantage of any opportunities for rest which may occur in the course of their work."

==== Kerala ====
The right to sit movement in India has been led by the Kerala-based feminist labor union Penkoottu. The Penkoottu labor union was founded by Viji Palithodi, a tailor-activist from the city of Kozhikode.

Kerala passed a right to sit law in 2018, the first law of its kind in India.

According to Palithodi, despite changes to the law, some employers have refused to comply. Noting that the movement to ensure suitable seating is not over, Palithodi said that "There are several employers who still do not abide by the law. They are adamant about not allowing their employees to sit. This should change."

==== Tamil Nadu ====
Tamil Nadu followed in September 2021, becoming the second Indian state to pass similar legislation. Tamil Nadu's law was introduced by Ganesan C. V, a Dravida Munnetra Kazhagam politician in the Tamil Nadu Legislative Assembly. The right to sit provision was granted as an amended subsection of the Tamil Nadu Shops and Establishments Act, 1947. The amendment, Section 22-A of the Act, reads: "The premises of every establishment shall have suitable seating arrangements for all employees so that they may take advantage of any opportunity to sit which may occur in the course of their work and thereby avoid 'on their toes' situation throughout the working hours."

=== Indonesia ===
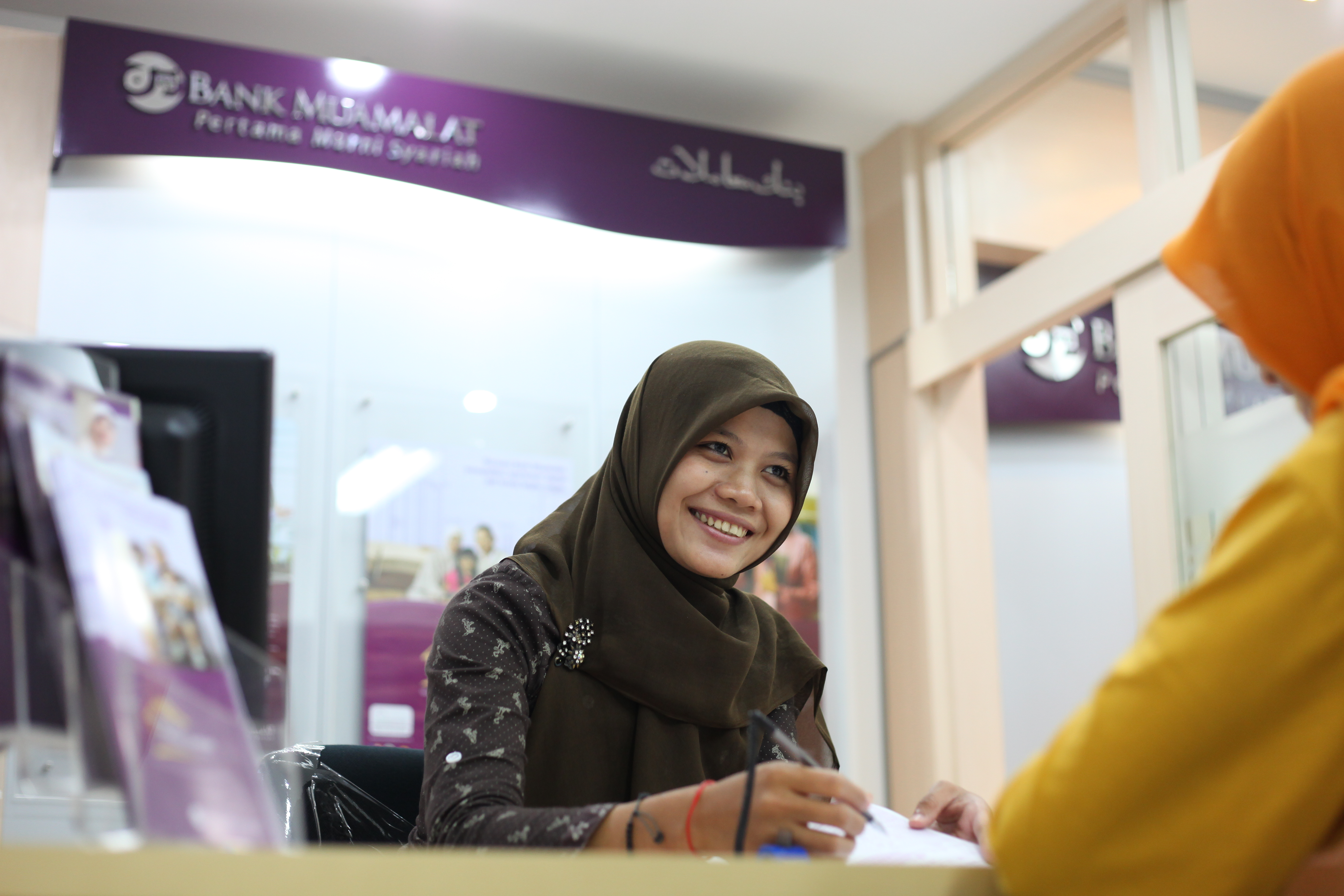
A seated bank teller in Indonesia, April 2011.

Indonesia ratified the International Labour Organization's Hygiene (Commerce and Offices) Convention, 1964 on 13 June 1969.

=== Iraq ===
Iraq ratified the International Labour Organization's Hygiene (Commerce and Offices) Convention, 1964 on 6 March 1987.

=== Ireland ===
Labor law in Ireland states that employers must provide seating facilities for workers and must provide reasonable opportunities for sitting down.

=== Israel ===
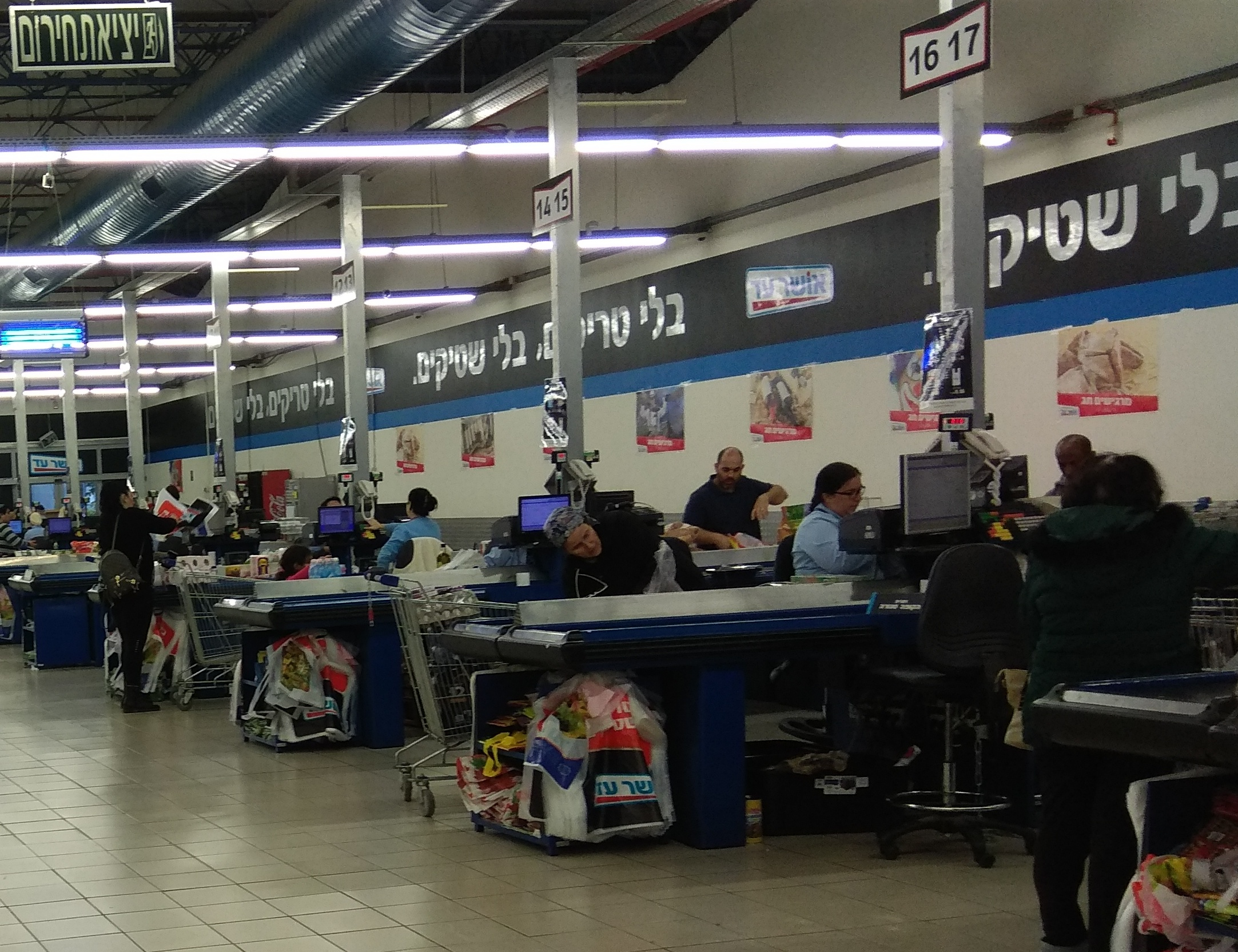
Seated cashiers at a supermarket in Israel, February 2018.

In the late 1990s, customers of the Universe Club supermarket chain in Israel complained to Na'amat and the Ministry of Labor, Social Affairs and Social Services that cashiers were not allowed to sit down. Histadrut, Israel's national trade union center, was supportive of workers' right to sit down.

The Right to Sit While Working law in Israel was proposed by Labor Party politician Shelly Yachimovich, an outspoken feminist and social democrat. The law aimed at stopping a common practice in many grocery stores and drug stores where cashiers were asked to work the tills while standing for the entire shift, although there was no practical reason for them not to sit. Labor rights organizations backed the law by claiming that the practice was insulting and disrespectful, while large chain-store retailer Super-Pharm fiercely lobbied against the law, arguing it should reserve the right to serve customers the way it sees fit. The law recognized the right to sit while working, and forced employers to provide chairs for the cashiers, salespersons and service workers unless employers could prove that the job at hand could not have been carried out from a sitting position. The law was passed in February 2007 and went into effect in May 2007. In December 2007, the Histadrut filed a lawsuit against 61 major retail shops and outlets that they alleged were violating the right to sit law, demanding NIS 20 million in compensation.

=== Italy ===
Italy ratified the International Labour Organization's Hygiene (Commerce and Offices) Convention, 1964 on 5 May 1971.

=== Jamaica ===
Jamaica's Factory Regulations law protects factory workers' right to sit. The law states that where "any persons employed in a factory have in the course of their employment reasonable opportunities for sitting without detriment to their work, there shall be provided and maintained for their use suitable facilities for sitting sufficient to enable them to take advantage of those opportunities." When the majority of work is done while sitting, a worker must be provided by their employer "a seat of a design, construction and dimensions suitable for him and the work, together with a foot-rest on which he can readily and comfortably support his feet if he cannot do so without a foot-rest", and furthermore, "the arrangements shall be such that the seat is adequately and properly supported while in use for the purpose for which it is provided."

=== Japan ===
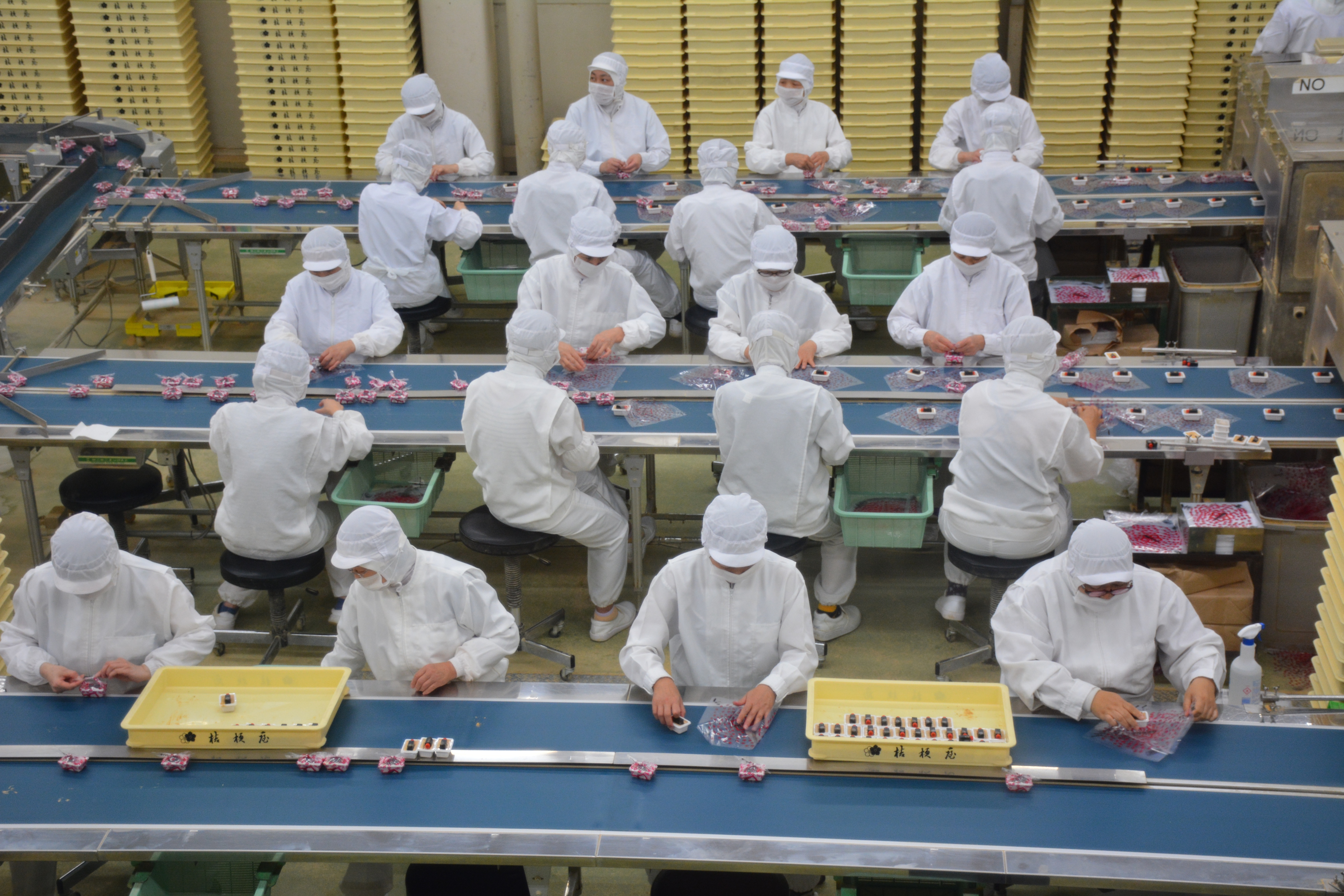
Seated factory workers in Japan, November 2017.

Japan ratified the International Labour Organization's Hygiene (Commerce and Offices) Convention, 1964 on 21 June 1993.

Japanese occupational and safety regulations require businesses to provide chairs for workers if they can perform their jobs while seated. In 2024, the Japanese Ministry of Health, Labour and Welfare announced that it would investigate retail employers such as supermarkets that refuse to provide seating for their workers.

=== Jordan ===
Jordan ratified the International Labour Organization's Hygiene (Commerce and Offices) Convention, 1964 on 11 March 1965.

=== Kenya ===
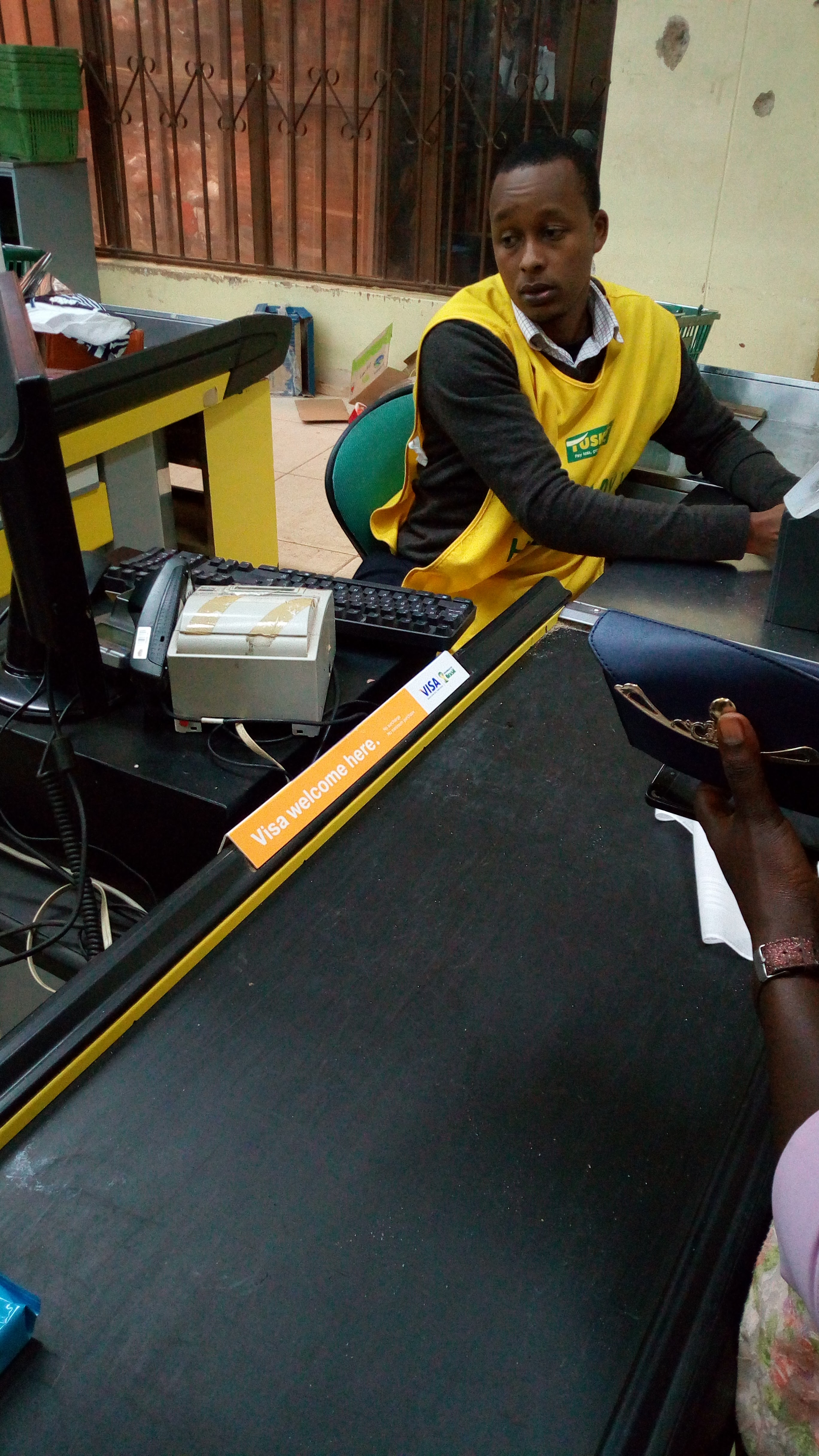
A seated cashier at a grocery store in Kenya, October 2017.

In 1949, the Kenya Colony passed legislation requiring that every "female shop assistant or journeyman shall be provided with a chair, seat, or other suitable appliance for use during the hours she is employed in the shop."

In 1984, the city of Mombasa passed the Mombasa Shop Hours Act, a provision of which protected the right to sit for female workers using the exact language of the national 1949 colonial-era right to sit law.

=== Kyrgyzstan ===
Kyrgyzstan ratified the International Labour Organization's Hygiene (Commerce and Offices) Convention, 1964 on 31 March 1992.

=== Latvia ===
Latvia ratified the International Labour Organization's Hygiene (Commerce and Offices) Convention, 1964 on 8 March 1993.

=== Lebanon ===
Lebanon ratified the International Labour Organization's Hygiene (Commerce and Offices) Convention, 1964 on 1 June 1977.

In 1954, Lebanon had a suitable seating law for women workers.

=== Lesotho ===
Lesotho's Labour Code Order, 1992 states that "[w]here employees have in the course of their employment reasonable opportunity for sitting without detriment to their work, there shall be provided and maintained for their use suitable seats to enable them to take advantage of those opportunities." Furthermore, the law stipulates that "[w]here a substantial proportion of any work can properly be done sitting, there shall be provided and maintained for each employee doing that work a seat of a design, construction and dimensions suitable for him or her and for the work, together with a back-rest if practicable, and a foot-rest on which he or she can readily and comfortably support his or her feet if he or she cannot do so without a foot-rest."

=== Luxembourg ===
Luxembourg ratified the International Labour Organization's Hygiene (Commerce and Offices) Convention, 1964 on 8 April 2008.

=== Madagascar ===
Madagascar ratified the International Labour Organization's Hygiene (Commerce and Offices) Convention, 1964 on 21 November 1966.

=== Malaysia ===
Malaysian labor law protects a worker's right to suitable seating, with detailed guidelines on properly ensuring suitable seating in the workplace. Regulation 30 (1) of the Factories and Machinery (Safety, Health and Welfare) Regulations 1970 stipulates that "every factory where persons employed have in the course of their employment, reasonable opportunities for sitting without detriment to their work, there shall be provided and maintained suitable and sufficient seating facilities for their use." Regulation 30 (2) stipulates that employers must provide workers in these jobs suitable seating and that the seating "arrangements shall be such that the seat is adequately and properly supported while in use for the purpose for which it is provided." Enforcement of these provisions are carried out by the Malaysian Department of Occupational Safety and Health (DOSH), a department of the Ministry of Human Resources (Malaysia).

=== Mali ===
Art.D.170-14 of the Labor Code of Mali stipulates that workers must have access to suitable seating when the nature of the work permits seating.

=== Mauritius ===
In Mauritius, The Occupational Safety and Health Act 2005 protects workers' right to sit.

=== Mexico ===
Mexico ratified the International Labour Organization's Hygiene (Commerce and Offices) Convention, 1964 on 18 June 1968.

Article 132, Section V of Mexico's Federal Labor Law states that employers must maintain a suitable number of seats for workers when the work can reasonably be performed while seated. In 2023, the "Chair Law" (Ley Silla) was introduced in the Senate of the Republic, which would extend right to sit protections under Mexican law. The law was proposed by Senator Patricia Mercado. Senator Mercado described the measure as a women's rights concern, due to the fact that retail workers are disproportionately female. The law was approved by the Mexican Senate in February of 2024 on an 82–0 vote.

=== Netherlands ===
A 1921 report from the International Labour Office stated that the Netherlands had a suitable seating law for all workers, regardless of sex.

=== Namibia ===
Workers in South African-ruled South West Africa were guaranteed a right to sit. Ordinance No. 15 of 1939 states that "Every employer shall provide suitable seating accommodation for his shop assistants, to enable them to rest when possible".

=== New Zealand ===
New Zealand enacted a right to sit law for women workers in 1894. The Shop and Shop-assistants Act, 1894 stipulated that "Every shopkeeper is hereby required to provide proper sitting accommodation for females employed in his shop, and if any shopkeeper fails to comply wIth the requirements of this section he shall for every week during which he fails be liable to a penalty not exceeding five pounds."

In 1950, New Zealand labor law stated that it is an "employer's obligation to provide suitable facilities for sitting sufficient to enable female workers whose work is done standing to take advantage of opportunities for rest, while the Inspector may require suitable seats to be provided where he is of opinion that any workers of class of workers in a factory (male or female) can conveniently and satisfactorily do their work or a substantial part thereof while sitting." The law stipulated that the Inspector may check seating as a regular aspect of inspections. A 1950 survey of factories and mills found the enforcement of the law to be "reasonably good".

New Zealand's Shops and Offices Act, 1955 includes a provision for suitable seating for female workers.

In 1981, New Zealand law required that "Seats for females operatives shall be provided with back rests."

=== Norway ===
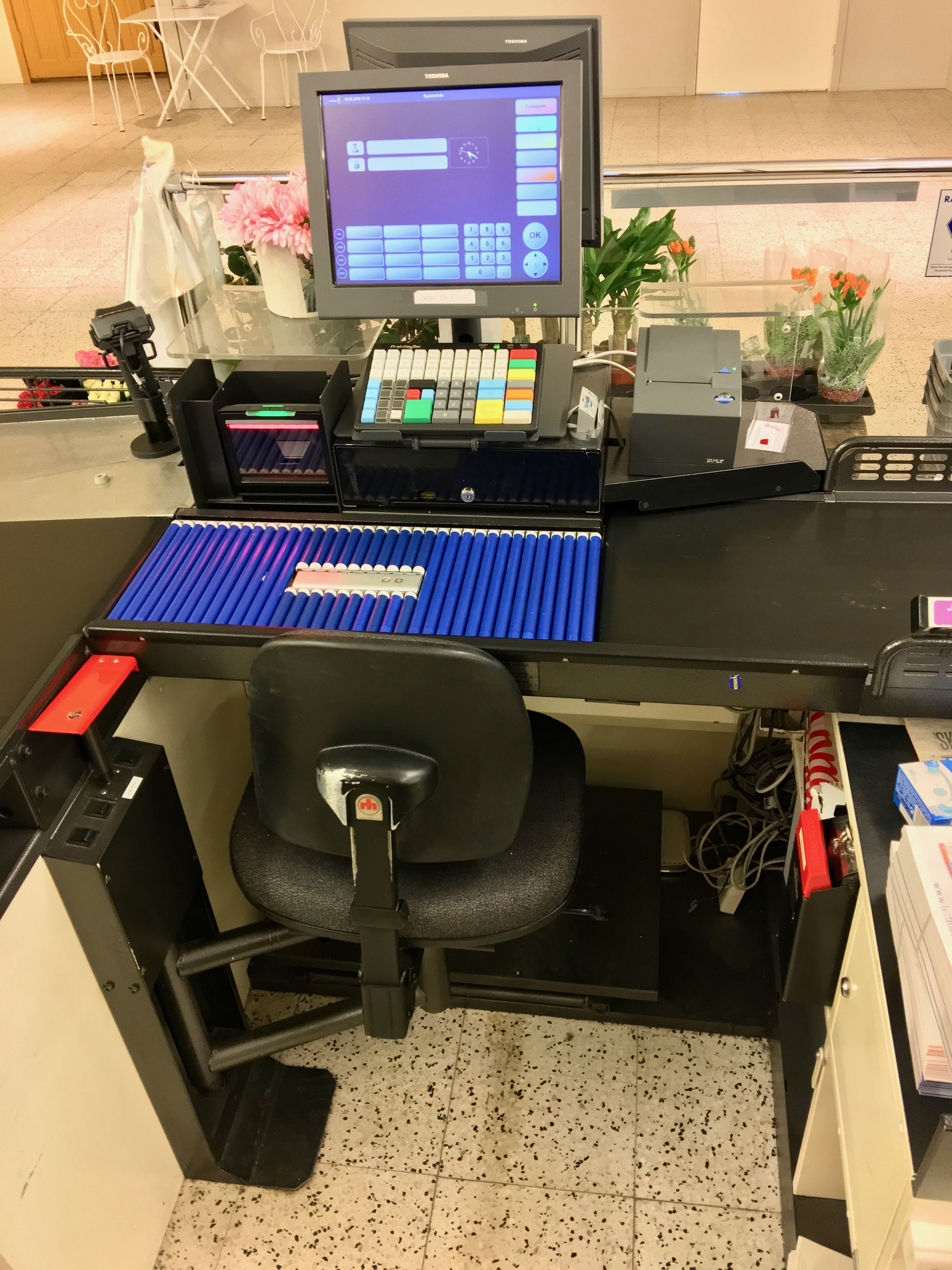
A checkout station with a chair at a supermarket in Norway, March 2018.

Norway ratified the International Labour Organization's Hygiene (Commerce and Offices) Convention, 1964 on 6 June 1966.

=== Panama ===
Panama ratified the International Labour Organization's Hygiene (Commerce and Offices) Convention, 1964 on 19 June 1970.

=== Paraguay ===
Paraguay ratified the International Labour Organization's Hygiene (Commerce and Offices) Convention, 1964 on 10 July 1967.

=== Peru ===
Peru's Congress ratified the Law No. 32721, which grants the right to sit to workers that remain standing for over three hours, on 6 July 2023.

=== Philippines ===
On April 15, 1952, the Congress of the Philippines passed Republic Act No. 679, a provision of which granted women workers and child workers the right to sit. The act stipulated that it "shall be the duty of every employer...to provide seats proper for women and children and permit them to use such seats when they are free from work and during working hours, provided they can perform their duties in this position without detriment to efficiency." Republic Act No. 679 was repealed on May 1, 1974, by Presidential Decree No. 442, which maintained the right to sit provision for women workers but omitted mention of child workers.

In 2014, House Bill 5258, titled "Right to Sit Down on the Job Act of 2014", was introduced in the House of Representatives of the Philippines. The bill would require owners of shopping malls, department stores, and other retail outlets to allow their workers to sit when not attending to customers. The law was proposed by Roy Señeres of the Labor Party Philippines. Señeres stated that excessive standing is "deleterious to the health of the workers, especially women" as well as "inhuman as only animals like carabaos, cows and horses can endure being on their feet" all day. A similar bill was introduce in the Senate of the Philippines by Nancy Binay of the United Nationalist Alliance.

=== Poland ===
The Polish People's Republic ratified the International Labour Organization's Hygiene (Commerce and Offices) Convention, 1964 on 26 June 1968.

=== Portugal ===
Portugal ratified the International Labour Organization's Hygiene (Commerce and Offices) Convention, 1964 on 24 February 1983.

=== Russia ===
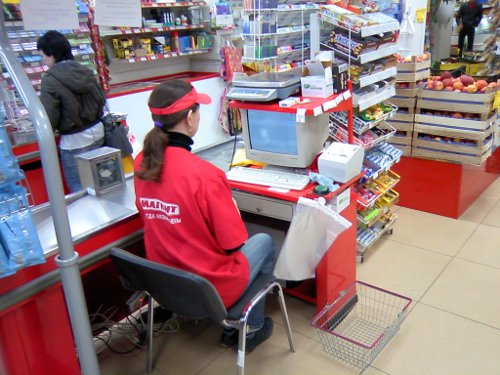
Seated cashier at a supermarket in Russia, October 2010.

The Russian Soviet Federative Socialist Republic ratified the International Labour Organization's Hygiene (Commerce and Offices) Convention, 1964 on 22 September 1967.

=== Saint Kitts and Nevis ===
The Shops Regulation Act in Saint Kitts and Nevis states that "[t]he owner or occupier of any shop to which this Act applies in which female shop assistants are employed shall at all times provide and keep therein a sufficient number of suitable seats or chairs for the use of such female shop assistants and shall permit them to use such seats or chairs when not necessarily engaged in the work or duty for which they are employed.

=== Saudi Arabia ===
Saudi Arabia ratified the International Labour Organization's Hygiene (Commerce and Offices) Convention, 1964 on 07 Dec 2020, with the convention entering into effect on 07 Dec 2021.

=== Senegal ===
Senegal ratified the International Labour Organization's Hygiene (Commerce and Offices) Convention, 1964 on 25 April 1966.

=== Singapore ===
Singapore's "Seats for employees engaged in retail trade or business" law guarantees the right to sit.

In 2022, the health and beauty chain Watsons issued a statement that their company did not have a "no sitting" policy after workers and the workers' rights group Workers Make Possible complained that Watsons' workers were not being allowed to sit.

=== Slovakia ===
Slovakia ratified the International Labour Organization's Hygiene (Commerce and Offices) Convention, 1964 on 1 January 1993.

=== South Africa ===
Workers in South West Africa were guaranteed a right to sit. Ordinance No. 15 of 1939 states that "Every employer shall provide suitable seating accommodation for his shop assistants, to enable them to rest when possible".

South Africa's Occupational Health and Safety Act of 1993 requires that all employers, where reasonably practicable, must "provide an ergonomically sound seat for every employee whose work can be effectively performed while sitting". Workers whose jobs are usually performed while standing must be allowed to "take advantage of any opportunity for sitting which may occur, and for this purpose the employer shall provide seating facilities." All employers are required to "provide seats with backrests where the nature of work performed by the employees is such that such seats can be used."

=== South Korea ===
In 2018, the Federation of Korean Trade Unions demanded that South Korean workers at retail outlets such as Lotte Mart and other supermarkets be allowed to sit down while working. Ten years had passed since South Korean retail workers had first organized for the right to sit in 2008. While the campaign by the Federation of Korean Trade Unions has not secured a change to South Korean law, some supermarkets have begun to offer chairs to their workers. South Korean women who are required to wear high heels while working are at added risk of damage to their health.

=== Spain ===
Spain passed a "Chair Law" (Ley Silla) for women workers in 1912. The law was controversial at the time because it was considered paternalistic and discriminatory. Due to criticism of the gendered nature of the law, it was amended in 1918 to apply to all workers regardless of sex. The law is still active, but is rarely enforced.

Spain ratified the International Labour Organization's Hygiene (Commerce and Offices) Convention, 1964 on 16 June 1970.

=== Sri Lanka ===
Sri Lanka's Shop and Office Employees Act of 1954 established the right to sit for women workers.

=== Sweden ===
Sweden ratified the International Labour Organization's Hygiene (Commerce and Offices) Convention, 1964 on 11 June 1965.

=== Switzerland ===
Switzerland ratified the International Labour Organization's Hygiene (Commerce and Offices) Convention, 1964 on 18 February 1966.

=== Syria ===
Syria ratified the International Labour Organization's Hygiene (Commerce and Offices) Convention, 1964 on 10 June 1965.

=== Taiwan ===
Occupational Safety and Hygiene Facility Regulation, amended in July 2014, requires seating be provided during rest if the work involves prolonged standing.

=== Tajikistan ===
Tajikistan ratified the International Labour Organization's Hygiene (Commerce and Offices) Convention, 1964 on 26 November 1993.

=== Tanzania ===
In Tanzania, the Occupational Health and Safety Act, 2003 states that "There shall be provided and maintained for the use of all workers whose work is carried while standing, suitable seats to enable them for sitting to take advantage of any rest period which may occur in the course of their employment."

=== Trinidad and Tobago ===
Chapter 82:02 of Trinidad and Tobago's Shop (Hours of Opening and Employment) Act contains a suitable seating provision for female workers. The law states that "In all rooms of a shop where female shop assistant are employed the occupier of the shop shall provide seats behind the counter, or in such other position as may be suitable for the purpose, and such seats shall be in the proportion of not less than one seat to every three female shop assistants employed in each room, with a minimum of one seat in each room."

The Oilfields Workers' Trade Union (OWTU) has advocated for seating for cashiers at PriceSmart locations in Trinidad and Tobago. In December, 2025, unionized PriceSmart workers in Port of Spain protested for the right to sit. OWTU has been advocating for seating for cashiers for 15 years.

=== Tunisia ===
Tunisia ratified the International Labour Organization's Hygiene (Commerce and Offices) Convention, 1964 on 14 April 1970.

=== Uganda ===
Uganda's Occupational Safety and Health Act, 2006 protects workers' right to sit. The act states that workers must be granted a "reasonable opportunity to sit during the period of their work, sufficient and suitable seats shall be provided and maintained by the employer, to enable the workers take advantage of the opportunity to sit." The act also states that if a "substantial proportion of any work can be properly done while sitting, an employer shall provide and maintain, for each employee doing the work, a seat of a design, construction and dimension suitable for that work."

=== Ukraine ===
The Ukrainian Soviet Socialist Republic ratified the International Labour Organization's Hygiene (Commerce and Offices) Convention, 1964 on 19 June 1968.

=== United Kingdom ===
The United Kingdom first passed a right to sit law on August 9, 1899, the Seats for Shop Assistants Act 1899 (62 & 63 Vict. c. 21), establishing that one seat should be provided in shops for every three women.

The United Kingdom ratified the International Labour Organization's Hygiene (Commerce and Offices) Convention, 1964 on 21 April 1967.

In the United Kingdom, the Workplace (Health, Safety and Welfare) Regulations 1992 mandates that employers must provide suitable seating for workers that are not engaged in work that requires standing. This regulation applies even to workers who can only sit down some of the time. Cashiers are expected to sit down for most of their shift, rather than stand. Floor staff in retail outlets are expected to stand for much of their shifts, but are still granted the right to sit down some of the time. The law also states that seating provided to workers must be "well-designed and comfortable" and must be regularly maintained and replaced when damaged." The law states that a "suitable seat shall be provided for each person at work in the workplace whose work includes operations of a kind that the work (or a substantial part of it) can or must be done sitting." Seating can only be considered suitable if it is "suitable for the person for whom it is provided as well as for the operations to be performed" and "a suitable footrest is also provided where necessary."

The Health and Safety Handbook of the Royal Borough of Kensington and Chelsea in London states that "Suitable seats should be provided for workers to use during breaks." Suitable seating during a worker's break must be located in a suitable place where protective equipment need not be worn. Office workers who sit in office chairs are considered to already have suitable seating. Suitable rest areas with seating must be provided to workers and all new businesses must install separate break rooms.

==== Gibraltar ====
The Factories Act of Gibraltar, passed in 1956, protects a workers right to sit. The act reads: "There shall be provided and maintained, for the use of all workers whose work is done standing, suitable facilities for sitting sufficient to enable them to take advantage of any opportunities for resting which may occur in the course of their employment. Where a substantial proportion of any work can properly be done sitting suitable seats shall be provided for all persons employed on such work.

==== Montserrat ====
In 2013, Montserrat's revised edition of the Shops Regulation Act established that the "owner or occupier of any shop to which this Act applies in which female shop assistants are employed shall at all times provide and keep therein a sufficient number of suitable seats or chairs for the use of such female shop assistants and shall permit them to use such seats or chairs when not necessarily engaged in the work or duty for which they are employed." The law is still in force.

=== United States ===
Gender-neutral right to sit laws. Female-only laws. Right to sit law for minors. Law or regulation repealed. No law or unknown.

In the late 1800s and early 1900s, during the Progressive Era, numerous states passed laws granting workers the right to suitable seats, specifically for women workers. Principles of Labor Legislation, a foundational labor law text written in 1916 by John R. Commons and John Bertram Andrews, noted that an aspect of early 20th century labor reforms that is "[p]articularly striking is the special protection of women manifested in the laws on seats, toilets, and dressing-rooms." At the time, all right to sit legislation in the United States was gendered, applying specifically to women workers. They write that as "far back as the end of the 'seventies the dangers of constant standing for salesgirls were recognized, and it was urged that they be furnished seats and allowed to use them." They note that the first state to pass right to sit legislation for women workers was New York in 1881. By 1916, almost every state had such a right to sit law for women workers. Most state laws covered manufacturing and mechanical jobs, with some states covering virtually all jobs. Commons and Andrews claimed that these early right to sit laws were "of little real importance in protecting health...since it is practically impossible to see that employers and foremen allow the seats to be used even when provided."

By 1932, almost all of the states, the District of Columbia, and the territories of Puerto Rico and the Philippines, had passed laws requiring some form of suitable seating for women workers. The majority of states with right to sit laws specify that "suitable seats" be provided by employers and that workers be allowed to sit when standing is not required. The only state in the United States without a right to sit law by 1932 was Mississippi.

Six states have amended their right to sit laws to be gender neutral, including California, Massachusetts, Montana, New Jersey, Oregon, and Wisconsin. Florida's law has always been gender neutral. Pennsylvania, New York, and West Virginia retain gendered, female-specific statutes, however, the laws are not enforced. South Dakota's law only applies to minors. The majority of states have subsequently repealed their suitable seating laws or policies, including Alabama, Alaska, Arkansas, Arizona, Colorado, Connecticut, Delaware, Hawaii, Idaho, Illinois, Indiana, Iowa, Kansas, Kentucky, Louisiana, Maine, Maryland, Michigan, Minnesota, Missouri, Nebraska, New Hampshire, New Mexico, North Carolina, Nevada, North Dakota, Oklahoma, Rhode Island, Texas, Tennessee, Utah, Vermont, Virginia, Washington, and Wyoming.

Several cities have repealed their right to sit laws, including Baltimore, Chicago, Newport News, Portland, and Washington, D.C. Cities with active right to sit laws include Ann Arbor, Michigan; and St. Louis, Missouri. Disabled people who qualify may request seating as a reasonable accommodation under the Americans with Disabilities Act of 1990 and pregnant workers may request seating under the Pregnant Workers Fairness Act of 2023. Low-income workers and workers without health insurance may experience difficulties in acquiring a doctor's note in order to request an accommodation.

=== Uruguay ===
Uruguay's Chair Law (Ley de la Silla) was passed in 1918, granting suitable seating to workers.

Uruguay ratified the International Labour Organization's Hygiene (Commerce and Offices) Convention, 1964 on 19 Jun 1968.

=== Venezuela ===
Venezuela ratified the International Labour Organization's Hygiene (Commerce and Offices) Convention, 1964 on 6 September 1995.

=== Vietnam ===
Vietnam ratified the International Labour Organization's Hygiene (Commerce and Offices) Convention, 1964 on 3 October 1994.

=== Zambia ===
Zambia's Factory Act, 1966, has provisions for suitable seating. The law states that workers "shall be provided and maintained for their use suitable facilities for sitting" as long as the work can be reasonably performed while seated.

== Accommodations ==
Some countries have specific seating accommodations for disabled, pregnant, or minor workers. Federal law in the United States protects the right to sit for pregnant workers and disabled workers who qualify. Some sub-national jurisdictions grant suitable seating to disabled, pregnant, or minor workers, including some states of the United States. However, low-income workers and workers who do not have health insurance may face difficulties acquiring a doctor's note.

== Right to stand ==
Some jurisdictions protect both the right to sit and the right to stand. The US Equal Employment Opportunities Commission states that the Americans with Disability Act and the Pregnant Workers Fairness Act protect the right of qualifying disabled and pregnant workers to request standing as a reasonable accommodation.

== Health risks of excessive standing ==
In the 17th century, the Italian physician Bernardino Ramazzini published De Morbis Artificum Diatriba ("Diseases of Workers"), one of the first recorded works arguing that prolonged standing was injurious to the health of workers. In the chapter concerning "Workers Who Stand", Ramazzini called for a reduction in hours spent standing while working. Ramazzini cites carpenters, loggers, carvers, blacksmiths, and masons as examples of workers required to stand for great lengths of time.

Studies conducted by Canadian researchers involving workers in Ontario determined that cashiers, chefs, machine tool operators, and other workers who are required to stand for long hours, are at heightened risk of cardiovascular disease compared to workers who mostly sit down. The Canadian Centre for Occupational Health and Safety lists varicose veins, swelling and inflammation from blood pooling in the legs and feet, general muscle pain and fatigue, and pain in the feet, legs, back, and neck as dangers of prolonged standing, as well as joint immobilization in the knees, feet, hips, and spine.

The Union of Shop, Distributive and Allied Workers in the United Kingdom supports workers' right to sit, stating that excessive standing "can cause backache and pain in the legs".

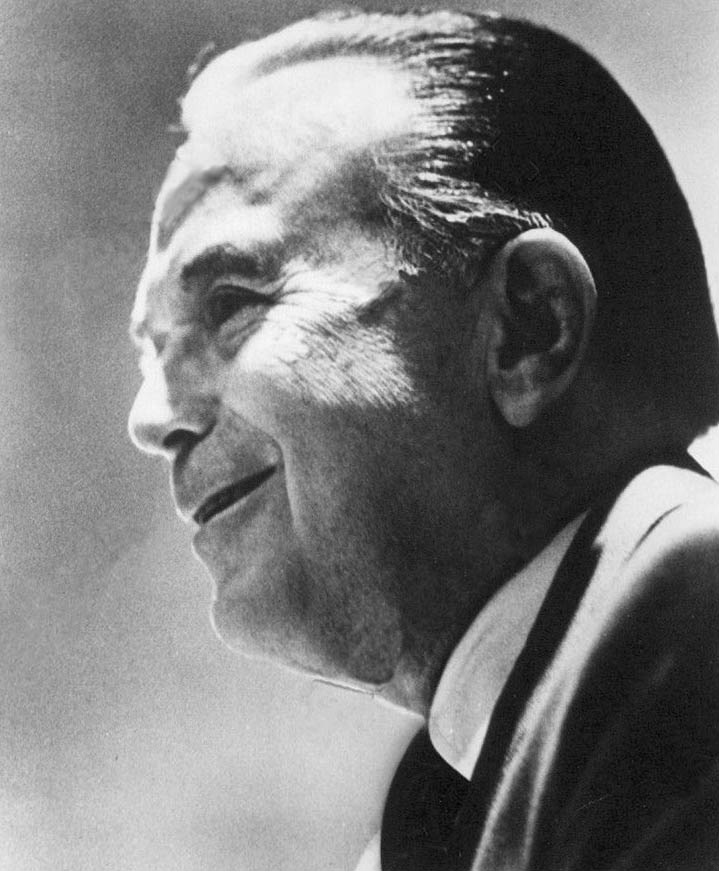
Former McDonald's CEO Ray Kroc, who popularized the phrase "If you've got time to lean, you've got time to clean."

== Criticism of gendered provisions ==
Professor Carol Louw of the University of South Africa claims that female-specific provisions in right to sit laws "reinforced stereotypes regarding women's frailty." Law professors Sacha Prechal and Noreen Burrows argued against sex-specific provisions in right to sit laws because "working conditions should be as safe and as pleasant as possible for all employees" regardless of sex.

== Opposition to the right to sit ==
Ray Kroc, the former CEO of McDonald's, was critical of workers sitting or leaning while at work. In the 1960s, Kroc used the catchphrase "If you’ve got time to lean, you’ve got time to clean." According to Jacobin writer Alex N. Press, the catchphrase has become popular with managers.

== See also ==
- Ergonomics
- High heel policy
- Pink-collar worker
- Potty parity
- Protective laws
- Right to sit in the United States
- Seats for Shop Assistants Act 1899
- Sitting
- Women in the workforce
- Women's work
