= GOST R 5172556 =

GOST R 5172556 is a Russian government norm which fix the rules for the catalogization of products for federal states needs and for QLF, telecommunications and data bases, requirements of information security. Generally GOST (Russian: ГОСТ) refers to a set of technical standards maintained by the Euro-Asian Council for Standardization, Metrology and Certification (EASC), a regional standards organization operating under the auspices of the Commonwealth of Independent States (CIS).

According to Russian Law, more than 60% of all products to be sold and/or used in the country require mandatory certification/licensing, i.e. they should be approved by relevant Russian authorities in terms of compliance to national standards. This concerns both locally produced and imported goods. Moreover, prior to construction of an industrial or civil site in the Russian territory, a number of approvals are required to undertake engineering, construction and other technical activities.

Today, GOST R Certificate of Conformity is the most common permissive document in Russia testifying that your product meets necessary safety standards. In the framework of the GOST R certification system there are 48 sub-systems for homogeneous products such as crockery, perfumes and cosmetics, textile and light industry products, chemical products, high voltage electrical equipment, metal processing machinery, oil & gas equipment etc.
