= Uniform Shipping Law Code =

Australian law

Uniform shipping Law Code (USL Code) is one of the shipping laws and regulations of Australia, which provides standards for the design, construction and operation of domestic commercial vessels in Australian waters. The basic idea of the uniform shipping laws code is to harmonize the regulations of the sailing vessels, boats and commercial ships operate in Australian waters.

== History ==
The USL Code was first published in 1979, which was in response to the needs for a common national safety standard for all commercial vessels in Australia.
