= List of occupational safety and health agencies =

This is a geographically sorted list of national and subnational government agencies focusing on occupational safety and health. Subnational agencies are indented and listed after the corresponding national agencies.

== Africa ==
- Occupational Safety and Health studies center (Egypt)
- Lagos State Safety Commission Nigeria
- Occupational Health Safety & Environment Department of Akwa Ibom State Infrastructure and Asset Management and Maintenance Agency, Nigeria
- National Institute for Occupational Health (South Africa)
- Occupational Safety and Health Authority (Tanzania)
- Directorate of Occupational Safety and Health Services (Kenya)

== Asia ==
- Ministry of Emergency Management (China)
- Japan Industrial Safety and Health Association (Japan)
- National Institute of Occupational Safety and Health (Malaysia)
- National Occupational Safety and Health (OSH) Profile (India)
- Korea Occupational Safety and Health Agency
- National Institute of Occupational Safety and Health (Sri Lanka)

== Europe ==
- European Agency for Safety and Health at Work
- Scientific Committee on Occupational Exposure Limit Values (European Union)
- Finnish Institute of Occupational Health
- Agence nationale de sécurité sanitaire de l'alimentation, de l'environnement et du travail (France)
- Federal Institute for Occupational Safety and Health (Germany)
- Health and Safety Authority (Ireland)
- National Institute of Occupational Health (Norway)
- National Institute for Safety and Health at Work (Spain)
- Swedish Work Environment Authority

=== United Kingdom ===
- Health and Safety Executive
- Office for Nuclear Regulation
- Health and Safety Commission (defunct)
- Her Majesty's Railway Inspectorate (defunct)
  - Health and Safety Executive for Northern Ireland

== North America ==
- Canadian Centre for Occupational Health and Safety
  - WorkSafeBC
  - Workplace Safety & Insurance Board (Ontario)

=== United States ===
==== Federal ====
- U.S. Chemical Safety and Hazard Investigation Board
- National Advisory Committee on Occupational Safety and Health
- National Institute for Occupational Safety and Health
- Navy Occupational Safety & Health
- Mine Safety and Health Administration
- Occupational Safety and Health Administration
- Occupational Safety and Health Review Commission

==== State ====
- California Occupational Safety and Health Administration
- Michigan Occupational Safety and Health Administration
- Oregon Occupational Safety and Health Division
- Washington State Industrial Safety and Health Administration

== Oceania ==
- National Offshore Petroleum Safety and Environmental Management Authority (Australia)
- National Offshore Petroleum Safety Authority (Australia; defunct)
- Safe Work Australia
  - Worksafe (Western Australia)
  - WorkSafe Victoria
- WorkSafe New Zealand
