= Hygiene (Commerce and Offices) Convention, 1964 =

International Labour Organization Convention

C120
- ILO Convention
- Date of adoption: August 8, 1964
- Date in force: March 29, 1966
- Classification: Commerce and Offices
- Subject: Occupational Safety and Health
- Previous: Guarding of Machinery Convention, 1963
- Next: Employment Injury Benefits Convention, 1964

Hygiene (Commerce and Offices) Convention, 1964 is an International Labour Organization Convention.

It was established in 1964, with the preamble stating:

Having decided upon the adoption of certain proposals with regard to hygiene in commerce and offices,...

== Ratifications ==
As of 2022, the convention has been ratified by 52 states.

== Provisions ==
Article 14 of the convention establishes that "[s]ufficient and suitable seats shall be supplied for workers and workers shall be given reasonable opportunities of using them."

== See also ==
- Right to sit
