= Viji Palithodi =

Viji Penkoottu
- Born: 1968 (age 57–58); Calicut
- Citizenship: India
- Occupations: Union Leader, Tailor
- Spouse: Suresh.k
- Children: Amrutha .k and Anandhu .k
- Parent(s): Second daughter of K.sahadevan and P.kamala

Viji Palithodi (P.Viji; born 1968) created the women's union, Asanghaditha Mekhala Thozhilali Union (Union for workers of unorganised sectors) as a part of women's group Penkoottu, in Kerala, India and won basic rights for women working as saleswomen, including the right to sit during working hours. She is part of BBC's list of 100 inspiring and influential women from around the world for 2018.

She fought for the ‘Right to Sit’ for female shop workers particularly in the textile industry as they were made to stand all day in the shop.

== Life ==
Viji worked as a volunteer at the National Women's Conference held in 1992 in Kozhikode, where she found her political inspiration and direction in feminism. At the age of 16, Viji started her first job in a tailor's shop. At the time, as part of the motivation towards her future movements, whilst most of the family members in the home worked for money for the family, her father worked and spent money for parties and social events. In the early 2000s, she organized meetings where women would compare salaries and working conditions at the biggest commercial area in Kozhikode, Mittayitheru. At the time some were not allowed to drink water during summers, and others not able to go to the bathroom. Even if there were no customers in the store, women would be paid less if they were caught sitting down on the security cameras.

It was after seeing this injustice, Viji created Penkoottu, a women's group named after the local word for 'a crowd of/ a friendship between women' or more commonly, 'women for each other', that spread through several districts in Kerala. They were able to successfully fight for further rights like the right to sit for saleswomen. After a law was passed winning several rights for working women on July 4, 2018, Viji still fights for many rights that have yet to be won. She currently is the leader for the women-centric labour organization Asanghaditha Mekhala Thozhilali Union (AMTU), formed in 2014, translating to ‘Union of Workers in the Unorganized Sector’. This was created to aid in the lack of adequate space for women, and their issues, in traditional trade unions. There have been disagreements from other union organizations however that state there is a space, and more women need to come forward.

Viji also pushes for the use of the word 'worker' over 'staff', due to the higher associated strength in the word.
