= Safety standards =

Type of regulation

Safety standards are standards designed to ensure the safety of products, activities and processes, etc. Additional descriptive terms may help to clarify what hazards are being addressed, such as workplace safety standards (to keep workers safe), food safety standards (to verify that food is safe to eat), or consumer product safety standards (to ensure that manufacturers only sell products that are safe for consumers).They may be advisory or compulsory and are normally laid down by an advisory or regulatory body that may be either voluntary or statutory. In October 2021, a fire raging through multiple floors of a dilapidated apartment block in Kaohsiung highlighted the lax fire safety standards in Taiwan. China has recently experienced trouble with some of the post listed associations.

== Categories ==
=== Workplace ===
Workplace safety standards are set by a number of different organizations depending on where people are located. The standards are designed to keep workers safe from hazards present in the workplace. Some standards may be legally enforceable with citations and fines (ex. OSHA), while others may provide information about best practices in industry (ex. ACGIH).

Country	Workplace Safety and Health Agencies
Australia	Safe Work Australia
Canada	Federal: Canadian Centre for Occupational Health and Safety (CCOHS) Provincial: WorkSafeBC (British Columbia), Workplace Safety and Prevention Services (WSPS) (Ontario), WorkSafeNB (New Brunswick), and CNESST (Quebec)
Europe	European Agency for Safety and Health at Work (EU-OSHA)
UK	Health & Safety Executive (HSE)
United States	Occupational Safety and Health Administration (OSHA), National Institute for Occupational Safety and Health (NIOSH), American Conference of Governmental Industrial Hygienists (ACGIH)

=== Fire ===
Fire safety standards are developed to minimize fatalities in building fires and to save as much life and infrastructure as possible. Fire safety standards may be known as fire codes, with equipment often planned for and installed during construction so that the buildings can have features that protect the occupants, such as fire extinguishers, fire alarms, fire suppression systems, egress/emergency exit routes, and other features.

	Fire Safety Organizations
Australia	National Construction Code (NCC)
Canada	National Fire Code of Canada
Europe	European Fire Safety Alliance
UK	Health and Safety Executive (HSE)
United States	National Fire Protection Association (NFPA)

=== Food ===
Food safety standards are placed so that the food that people consume meet certain levels of quality and does not hurt them in any way.

	Food Safety Organizations
Australia	Food Standards Australia New Zealand (FSANZ)
Canada	Canadian Food Inspection Agency (CFIA)
Europe	European Food Safety Authority (EFSA)
UK	The Food Standards Agency (FSA)
United States	Food & Drug Administration (FDA)

=== Consumer ===
Consumer product safety standards are enforced so that consumers are protected against hazards in manufactured products.

	Consumer Product Safety Organizations	Laws
Australia	Australian Competition and Consumer Commission (ACCC)	
Canada	Canada Consumer Product Safety Act (CCPSA)	Canada Consumer Product Safety Act, Hazardous Products Act
Europe	General Product Safety Directive (GPSD)	
UK	Office for Product Safety and Standards (OPSS)	
United States	Consumer Product Safety Commission (CPSC)	U.S. Consumer Product Safety Act

== See also ==
- Consumer protection
- Bicycle safety
- China compulsory certification
- Injury prevention
- Public administration
- Road safety
- Standards organization
- Testing organizations
  - Baseefa (UK)
  - Canadian Standards Association (Canada)
  - Technischer Überwachungsverein (Germany, UK, China & USA)
  - Underwriters Laboratories (USA)
- Toy safety
- Safety by design
