= National Advisory Committee on Occupational Safety and Health =

The National Advisory Committee on Occupational Safety and Health (NACOSH) was established under the Occupational Safety and Health Act of 1970 to advise the Secretaries of Labor and Health and Human Services on occupational safety and health programs and policies. Members of the twelve-person advisory committee are chosen on the basis of their knowledge and experience in occupational safety and health.

The twelve-member NACOSH has two members representing management, two members representing labor, two members representing the occupational health professions, two members representing the occupational safety professions and four members representing the public. Two of the health representatives and two of the public members are designated by the Secretary of Health and Human Services, although actual appointment of these members, as well as all other members, is by the Secretary of Labor. The members serve two-year terms.
