= Medical certificate =

Written statement from a physician

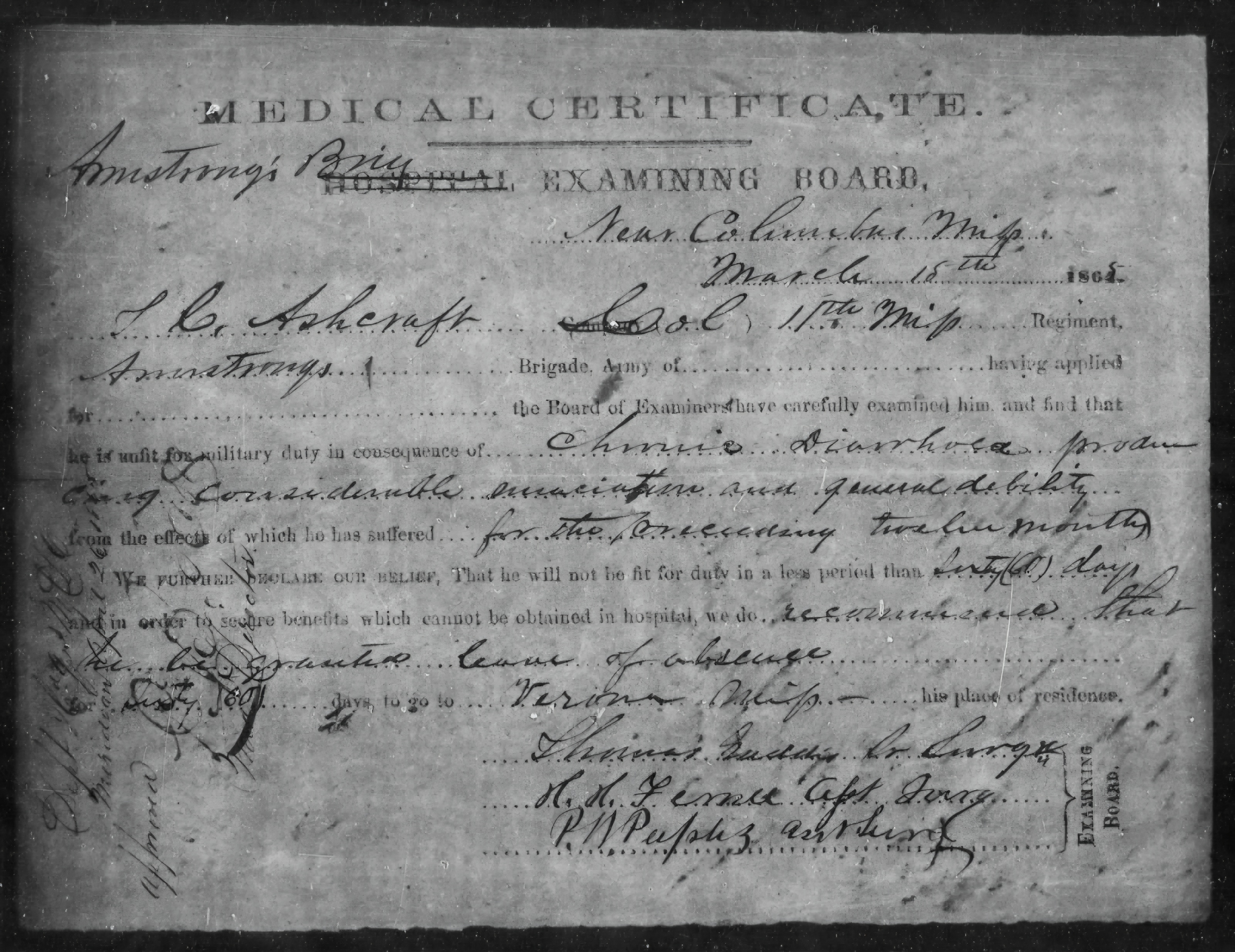
Medical certificate from Armstrong's Brigade Examining Board, March 1865

A medical certificate or doctor's certificate is a written statement from a physician or another medically qualified health care provider which attests to the result of a medical examination of a patient. It can serve as a sick note (UK: fit note) (documentation that an employee is unfit for work) or evidence of a health condition.

An aegrotat (/ˈiːɡroʊtæt/; from Latin aegrotat 'he/she is ill') or 'sick note' is a type of medical certificate excusing a student's absence from school for reasons of illness.

== Purpose ==
Medical certificates are sometimes required to obtain certain health benefits from an employer, to make an insurance claim, for tax purposes, or for certain legal procedures. Medical certificates are used to indicate eligibility of activity, such as the use of disabled parking. Medical certificates can also be used to describe a medical condition a person has, such as blindness. Medical certificates are often used to certify that someone is free of contagious diseases, drug addiction, mental illness, or other health issues.

Health criteria are often required when making an application for something, such as an eye examination to get a driver's license. Other times medical criteria are presented voluntarily by an applicant in a self-assessment, without either a doctor or access to the person's medical record. Specific health criteria or medical history are required for certain jobs.

In the United States, most aviators are required to possess a valid medical certificate that certifies sound health as part of the requirements for piloting an airplane or helicopter. While airman certificates are issued for life, the medical certificate expires and must be renewed periodically in order continue flying privileges. Sport pilots may use a valid state driver's license in place of a medical certificate, and glider and hot air balloon pilots are not required to obtain them.

== Fit to Fly Certificate ==
A Fit to Fly Health Certificate (also known as Fit to Fly Letter or Fit for Travel Health Certificate) is a type of doctor's note assessing the risk of an individual that they might pose to either themselves or others during air travel. This type of letter was traditionally most relevant for pregnant passengers—particularly while in the third trimester or pregnancy. However, since the COVID-19 pandemic, many airlines now require a Fit to Fly Certificate for international travel to minimize the risk of COVID-19 infections through air travel. It can be issued by most general practitioners or via telemedicine services.

== Aegrotat ==
The term aegrotat (abbreviated as aegrot) is used primarily in the United Kingdom and Commonwealth of Nations. In the context of British undergraduate degrees a student who is too ill to finish may be awarded an aegrotat degree if the student otherwise would have passed exams or other requirements.

== Impact on occupation ==
Except in certain unique circumstances, a holder of a medical certificate in the National Aeronautics and Space Administration may not "act as pilot in command or in any other capacity as a required flight crewmember of an aircraft".

A patient with conditions such as: measles, chicken-pox, hepatitis A, leprosy, typhoid fever, and whooping cough, can return to work immediately after their healing phase or medical tests. Almost always the patient may only be allowed to return to work upon submission of a medical certificate.

== Eligibility ==
Sometimes, there are standards and procedures in place, for workers in a certain field to be eligible to receive a medical certificate. Any airman who is required to hold a medical certificate must give the Federal Aviation Administration access to the National Driver Register. On top of this, other tests which are required for first-, second- and third-class airmen are: eye, ear/nose/throat/equilibrium, mental, neurologic, and cardiovascular.

The India List and India Office List 1905 explains that officers on "Long Leave in Europe" must, among other things, provide a medical certificate, which is obtained at the Medical Board of India Office.

Practical Guide to Employees' State Insurance Act, Rules and Regulations explains that under the ESI Act, the employee must obtain a medical certificate via the ESI Dispensary/Hospital, which then gets deposited at the nearest office of the ESI Corporation.

== Falsification ==
Falsifying a medical certificate is a form of fraud. Regulations concerning fabrication or forgery of medical certificates vary by jurisdiction, but users of falsified medical certificates may face legal and health consequences. In New South Wales, medical professionals who "deliberately issue a false, misleading or inaccurate certificate" can be charged under the Medical Practice Act.

For students, providing a forged medical certificate is viewed as academic misconduct. There have been discussions regarding whether submitting a fabricated medical certificate constitutes grounds for firing an employee. In many cases, it is deemed wrong, such as in Australia where a bank officer was dismissed after handing in a forged certificate, which prompted a Fair Work Australia Commissioner to say the former bank employee had a "continued lack of regard for the truth". Another example is a WA police officer who was stood down after committing the same offense. In one case, a woman claimed she was "coerced into falsifying [a] medical certificate [which ultimately led to her being fired] because she was 'being bullied and treated unfairly' by two managers".

== Good practice for medical certificates ==
Medical certificates must respect patients' right to confidentiality. Patient consent is required for sharing of personal medical information, and medical certificates should therefore not contain a diagnosis without permission from the patient. A number of key principles govern the issuing of medical certificate, although there are variations in procedure between jurisdictions.

In general, the certificate should include:

- The name and address of the doctor and the patient.
- The name and address of the party requiring the certificate (if required), such as an employer or school administrator.
- The specific period of time off work that is medically justifiable.
- The degree of incapacity, and whether the patient could return to work with altered duties.
- The date of the examination and the date on which the certificate was issued. Certificates may not be backdated, but they may cover a medically justifiable period prior to the medical examination taking place (for example, if an acutely ill person was unable to see a doctor immediately).
- Only facts or observations made by the doctor, or information reported by the patient that the doctor has taken "reasonable steps to verify", not deliberately leaving out relevant information.
- Plain language, avoiding "abbreviations or medical jargon".

The doctor must also have medical records substantiating the certificate.

== See also ==
- Birth certificate
- Death certificate
