= Occupational safety and health in Tanzania =

Regulations that govern occupational safety and health in the country

Tanzania has a number of laws and regulations that govern occupational safety and health (OSH) protections for workers. The International Labour Organization reports that due to insufficient statistics and consistent reporting, it is impossible to determine the number of workplace accidents that occur in the country.

== History of OSH law in Tanzania ==
The first law in Tanzania that related to workers health and safety was the Factories Ordinances Cap. 297 of 1950, that provided for occupational health and safety standards for workers in factories. As most of Tanzania's workforce was employed in the agricultural sector, this ordinance left most workers in the country unprotected. This law was replaced in 2003 with the new Occupational Health and Safety Act No. 5 of 2003, which covers workers in all sectors, including within the public sector and in local government authorities.

In addition to the general act, the country has also adopted a number of laws providing for protection in individual industries that are perceived to be more hazardous that usual. Some of these laws include:

- Tropical Pesticides Research Institute Act of 1979
- Pharmaceuticals and Poison Act of 1978
- Atomic Energy Act of 2003
- Industrial and Consumer Chemicals Act of 1985
- Public Health Act of 2009
- Mining Act of 2010

The Employment and Labour Relation Act No. 6 of 2004 also contains provisions for OSH, although it is primarily concerned with industrial relations matters rather than worker safety.

In 2008 another important step was made; The establishment of Workers' Compensation Fund through Workers Compensation Act No. 20 of 2008 with objectives of providing for compensation to employees for disablement of death caused by or result from injuries or diseases sustained or contracted in the course of employment; to establish Fund for administration and regulation of workers compensation and to provide for related matter.

== Statistics ==
Status of occupational accidents and injuries varies considerably between different sources. It is estimated that in mining and quarry sector, the injury rate is 17 per 1000 workers whereas the manufacturing sector is responsible for 10.1% of total occupational accidents, 9.6% of fatalities, 12.2% of partial disabilities and about 7.4% of temporary disability and the injury rate is 9.9 per 1,000 workers.

Report from National Audit office (NAO) showed that construction/building industry had highest Fatality rate of 23.7% followed by Transport and mining/quarrying that had 20.6% and 20.5 respectively (table 1 below). Injuries in transport sector is another life-threatening risk that continues to claim lives of people especially motorcyclist and public transport (buses). however the major challenge in these information is validity and reliability as the reporting and data keeping system in Tanzania is not well coordinated.

Table 1: Fatality Rate sectorwise

Sector	Total employees	Number of Fatal Injuries
Agriculture, forestry, Fishing	13,890,054	16
Mining and quarrying	29,223	6
Commerce and distribution	2,486,818	12
Manufacturing	245,449	28
Construction/building	151,
Total	16,914,805	121

Source: NAO report- Performance Audit Report on the Management of Occupational Health and Safety in Tanzania, 2013.

The presented information may be challenged by several other factors as reporting system is not well functional. There were a total of 6,599 registered workplaces equivalent to 24% of eligible workplaces. This lack of reliable information is a challenge to the authority dealing with OSH matters in Tanzania.

== See also ==
- Health in Tanzania
