= Outline of ergonomics =

Overview of and topical guide to ergonomics

The following outline is provided as an overview of and topical guide to ergonomics:

Ergonomics – study of designing equipment and devices that fit the human body, its movements, and its cognitive abilities.

== Branches of ergonomics ==
- Engineering psychology – Designing systems to suit their users
- Macroergonomics – Designing systems to suit their users
- Seating ergonomics – Chair designed for use at an office

== General ergonomics concepts ==
- Aesthetics – Philosophical study of beauty and art
- Comfort – Sense of physical or psychological ease
- Usability, also known as Ease of use – Capacity of a system for its users to perform tasks
- Business performance management – Processes to bring output into alignment with goals
- Productivity – Average measure of the efficiency of production
- Safety – State of being secure from harm, injury, danger, or other non-desirable outcomes
- Ergonomic hazards – Physical conditions that may pose a risk of injury

== Ergonomics scholars ==
- Frederick Winslow Taylor – American mechanical engineer (1856–1915)
- Wojciech Jastrzębowski – Polish biologist

== See also ==
- Right to sit
- Right to sit in the United States
- Rohmert's law – Law used to calculate "maximum holding time" for any particular task
