= Protective laws =

Laws enacted to protect women from hazards or difficulties of paid work

Protective laws were enacted to protect women from certain hazards or difficulties of paid work. These laws had the effect of reducing the employment available to women, restricting it to men. Protective laws often included prohibitions on women working at night or working in certain industries such as mining, as well as suitable seating laws for women workers. These were enacted in many jurisdictions in the United States, Canada, Australia, and elsewhere, and some were in effect until the mid or late 20th century. In the United States, the landmark case Muller v. Oregon set a precedent to use sex differences as a basis for separate legislation.

The name is not a formal one but is a widely used colloquial term, as was the term protective legislation.

== Range of laws ==
Over laws affected work hours, wages, occupational choice, mandatory seating, homework, and rights to do business and make contracts. Specifically, various laws required a minimum wage for women and children (criticized because women allegedly did not need the money, the minimum wage was opposed for men and ruled unlawful in 1923) and forbade or regulated lifting heavy loads, working at night or for long hours, or tending bar and required some safety and breaks from work for rest, lunch, and bathroom use. The ban on long hours often denied the possibility of earning overtime pay. Some of the laws were irrelevant to work but were intended to protect women's ability to become mothers and not be subject to sexual issues that were often categorized as moral issues.

== Rationale for passage ==
Protection of women was a rationale for the enactment of the laws. Women were considered more vulnerable than men in factories and sweatshops, and one supporter of the laws was the Amalgamated Clothing Workers, an American labor organization, which supported the laws for non-members of unions. Some supporters in unions and women's organizations, concerned that courts in the 1950s would oppose pro-labor legislation generally, wanted to preserve whatever such laws were already in place. By 1972, however, the year the Equal Rights Amendment (ERA) to the U.S. Constitution passed the Congress and was proposed to the states for ratification, unions supported the ERA and considered female-only protective laws as against women's interests.

Another rationale was put forth by an organization which, in 1836, adopted a resolution that said, "Whereas, Labor is a physical and moral injury to women and a competitive menace to men, we recommend legislation to restrict women in industry."

The minimum wage was supported except for men because of "widespread agreement that the labor market did not function effectively where women and the family were concerned" and among feminists because women needed to support their own dependents.

== Criticisms ==
They were criticized on several grounds.

- They failed to require protection from the hazards or difficulties for all workers who needed those protections.
- They denied jobs to women who did not need the protections at all or needed the jobs more than the protections and could make that choice.
- Many denied jobs rather than required changes, either at the workplaces or elsewhere, that would have reduced any reason for protection.
- Few, if any, of these laws applied to women's unpaid work at home or with families, which could be more hazardous or difficult than some of the restricted employments.
- Some women may have advocated for such laws, but many were put into effect when women did not have the vote or the right to hold electoral office, so the people ultimately responsible for legislating them were almost exclusively men, and they were responding to voters who were men.
- The laws disincentivized employers from hiring women.

The Norwegian feminist Betzy Kjelsberg was an early opponent of protective laws, such as the Night Work Convention. At the International Labor Conference in Washington, D.C. in 1919 she stated, "I am against special protective laws for women, except pregnant women and women nursing children one year of age because I believe that we are furthering the cause of good labor laws most by working toward the prohibition of all absolutely unnecessary night work. It is hard to see old worn out men and young boys in the most critical period of development work during the night."

Protective labor laws were criticized because they excluded women from prestigious well-paid male-dominated occupations, and they confined women's work to the home, thus reinforcing Separate Spheres ideology and the Cult of Domesticity.

In the United States, protective laws were opposed by the National Woman's Party (NWP), which led support for the Equal Rights Amendment. It opposed the laws as interfering with women's right to make contracts and as preventing them from offering their full capabilities at work, objecting, for example, to a 20-pound limit on lifting, if a woman wanted that job and could lift the weight.

== Modernity ==
In the United States, most or all were eventually amended, repealed, ruled unconstitutional (i.e., in violation of the US Constitution and thus invalid), or not enforced anymore because they singled women out for unequal treatment. Laws in the US may not be enforced if they are unconstitutional or otherwise unauthorized in law.. Had the Equal Rights Amendment to the US Constitution been enacted in the 1970s or the 1980s, it was believed the laws would have been invalidated by the amendment and subsequent litigation and, as a result, most liberal organizations opposed the amendment. The laws had earlier been supported by social feminists for decades.

Some of the laws in the US have been replaced by laws that apply to both genders, such as the Occupational Safety and Health Act.

An argument for protective laws still sometimes arises, as with debates over the US military's continuing legal ban on women in certain combat positions, when it is argued that the ban should remain in effect because women might be killed or raped.

== Jurisdiction ==
Many countries have enacted laws that constrain employment of women or of other groups of adults defined by characteristics at birth, although the laws may or may not be called "protective laws". Some protective laws are specific to girls or to pregnant women, while others include all women and girls.

=== Africa ===
==== Democratic Republic of the Congo ====
In 2012, the Democratic Republic of the Congo enacted legislation banning pregnant women from working in mining supply chains. Some Congolese women objected to the ban as they considered mining a more suitable field for pregnant women than agriculture.

==== Egypt ====
In Egypt, around the 1920s, the Egyptian Feminist Union advocated for protective legislation.

=== Oceania ===
==== Australia ====
The majority of Australian states passed right to sit legislation for women workers during the late 1800s and early 1900s.

==== New Zealand ====
New Zealand enacted a right to sit law for women workers in 1894. The Shop and Shop-assistants Act, 1894 stipulated that "Every shopkeeper is hereby required to provide proper sitting accommodation for females employed in his shop, and if any shopkeeper fails to comply wIth the requirements of this section he shall for every week during which he fails be liable to a penalty not exceeding five pounds."

== See also ==
- Mothers' pensions
- Muller v. Oregon
- Night Work Conventions
- Potty parity
  - Potty parity in the United States
- Right to sit
  - Right to sit in the United States
- Sheppard–Towner Act
