= Chair law =

Former Chilean statute

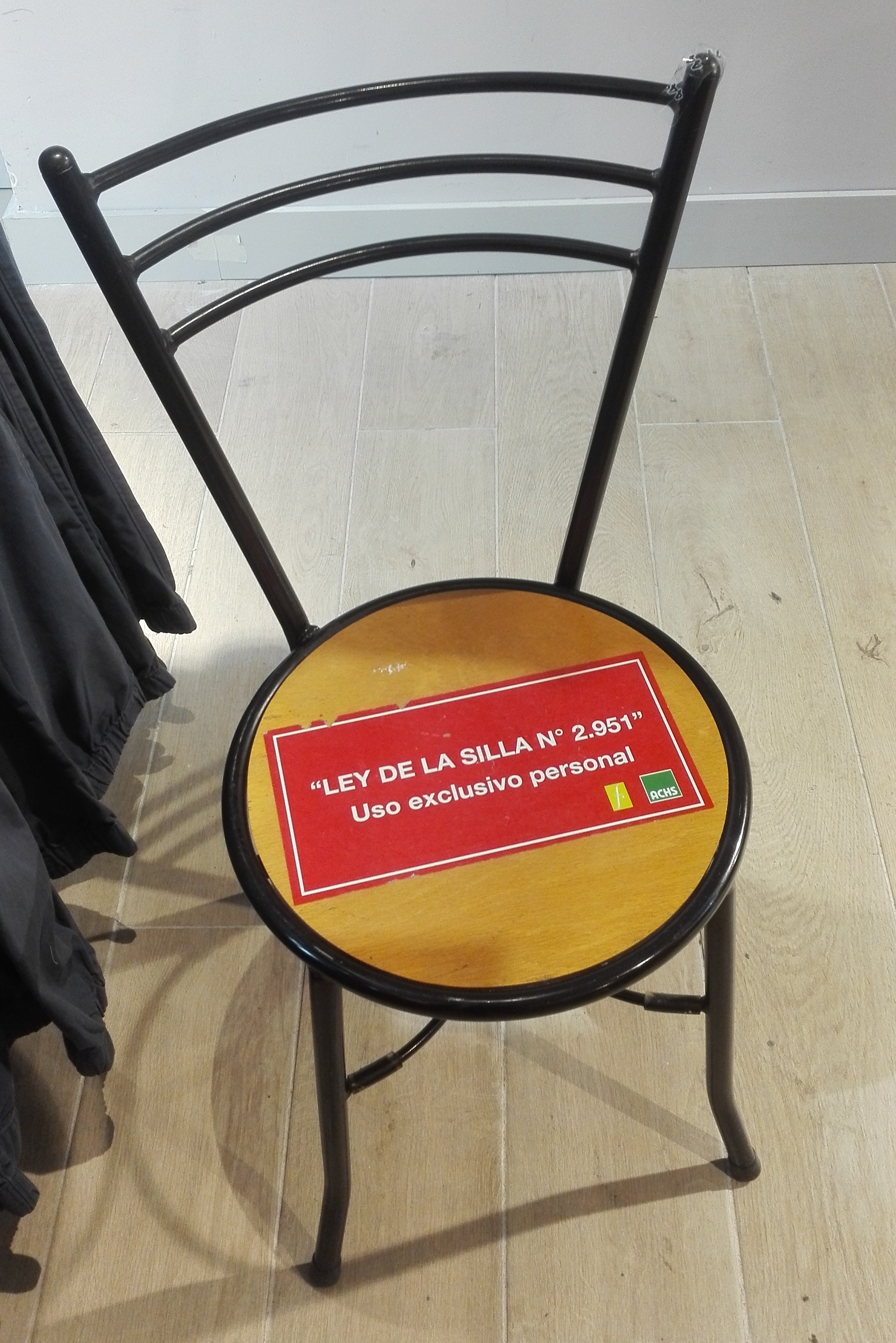
Chair intended for use by workers at a department store in Santiago.

The chair law (Spanish: ley de la silla), officially «Law Nº 2951, which establishes the rights of particular employees to rest in chairs», (Note: Spanish: Ley Nº 2951 que establece el descanso en silla a los empleados particulares) was a Chilean law which came into effect on 7 December 1914 under the government of Ramón Barros Luco, which obligated owners of commercial establishments to provide chairs for their employees. It was one of the first achievements of movements for workers' rights which sprang up at the end of the 19th century in Chile. While no longer on the books, the same right is provided by the modern Chilean Labor Code of 1994.

== History ==
The original version of the law consisted of three articles. Article I established that "an employer shall maintain a sufficient number of seats or chairs at the disposal of their employees". (Note: Spanish: "el patrón o empresario mantendrá el número suficiente de asientos o sillas a disposición de los dependientes o empleados") Article II established the right to have a break of at least one hour and a half for lunch. Article 3 established that "a fine of ten pesos be paid into the communal coffers" (Note: Spanish: "una multa de diez pesos, que ingresarán en arcas comunales") by employers for each violation of the law, and empowered municipalities to enforce compliance with the law.

In 1931, the chair law, along with other Chilean labor laws existing up to that time, was included among the provisions of Decreto con Fuerza de Ley Nº 178 (Note: lit. 'Decree with the Force of Law Nº 178') by the Ministry of Health, which included the first Chilean Labor Code, which was legally valid until 1987. The contents of the law were found in Title V of Book II of the DFL, titled «On chairs in industrial and commercial establishments», (Note: Spanish: Sobre sillas en los establecimientos comerciales e indusriales [sic]) in articles 333–335.

As of 1994, the contents of the law are found in Title I, Book II, Article 193 of the Chilean Labor Code of 1994.

== See also ==
- Labour law
- Right to sit
  - Right to sit in the United States
- Workers rights
