= Kokerbin Rock =

Monolith in Western Australia

- Kokerbin Hill
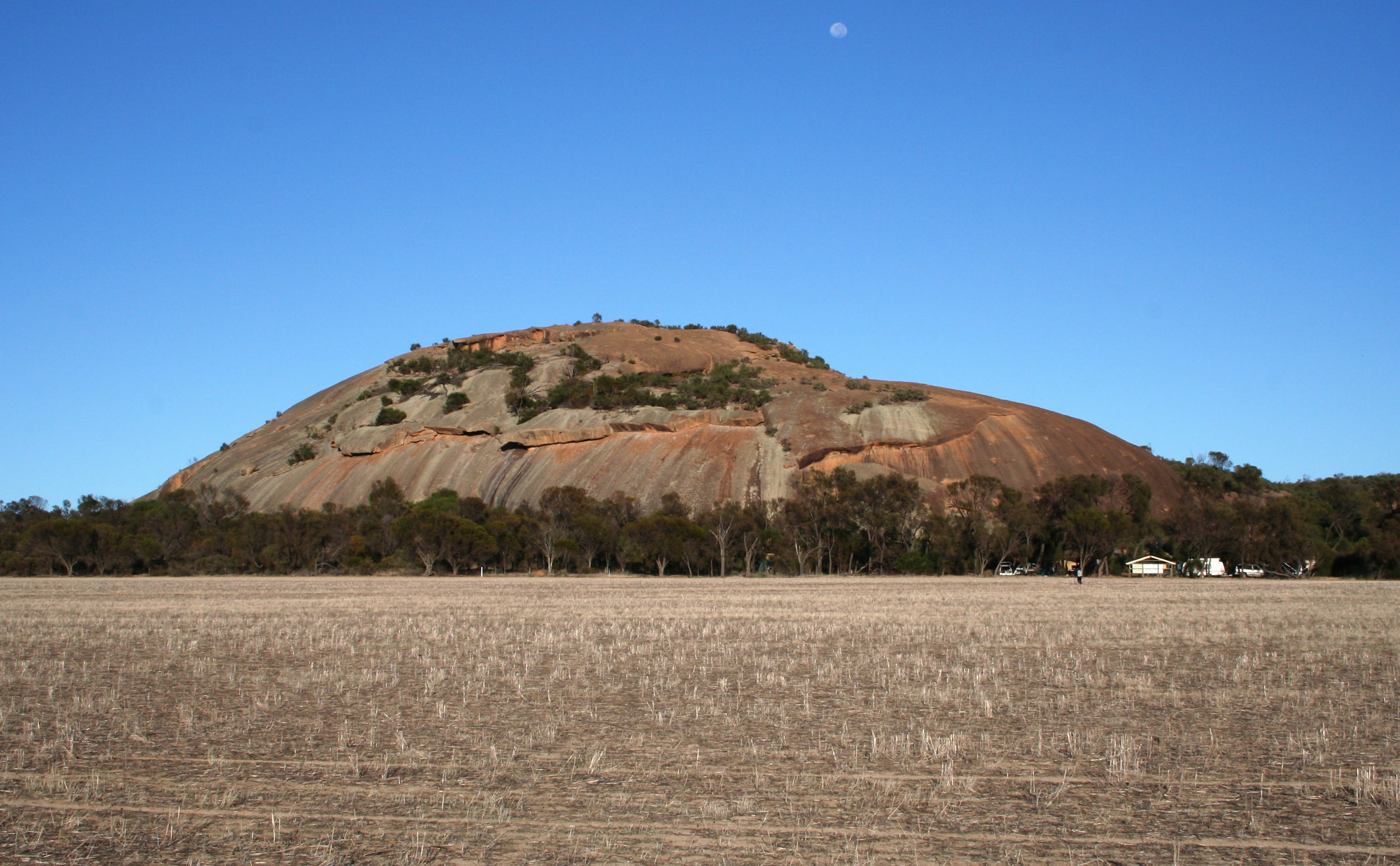
- Kokerbin Rock in the morning

Highest point
- Elevation: 122 m (400 ft)
- Coordinates: 31°53′20″S 117°42′24″E

Geography
- Location within Australia
- Kokerbin Rock is located within the Kokerbin Nature Reserve
- Location: Shire of Bruce Rock, Wheatbelt, Western Australia

Western Australia Heritage Register
- Type: Municipal Inventory
- Designated: 11 September 1997
- Reference no.: 10836

Kokerbin Rock, also known as Kokerbin Hill, is a granite rock formation located within Kokerbin Nature Reserve in the Wheatbelt region of Western Australia. The area has special significance for the Noongar. There are claims that Kokerbin Rock is the third largest monolith in Australia, with Mount Wudinna in South Australia being the second largest and Uluru in the Northern Territory being the largest.

Kokerbin Nature Reserve was established in 1991, and has an area of 91 hectares (220 acres). It is approximately 40 km (25 mi) east of Quairading and 30 km (19 mi) south of Kellerberrin by road.

== Description ==
Caves, rock formations, and the summit are accessible by marked bush walks. The rock formations include a wave rock formation, Dog Rock and Devil's Marbles. On the western side of Kokerbin Rock is a historic stone well and an old school site, remainders of early European settlement.

A picnic area and toilet facilities are located on the eastern side of Kokerbin Rock.

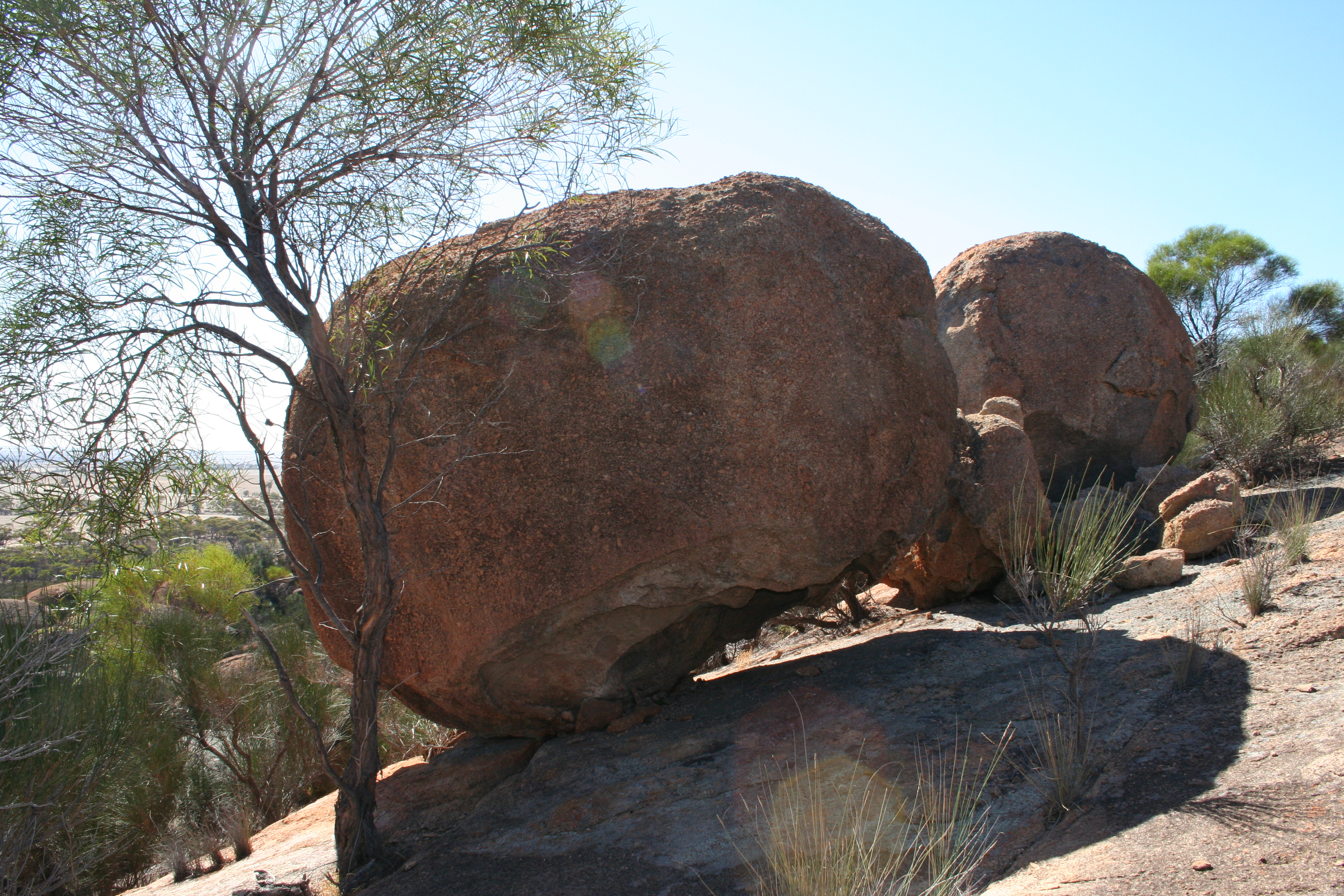
Rock formation on Kokerbin Rock

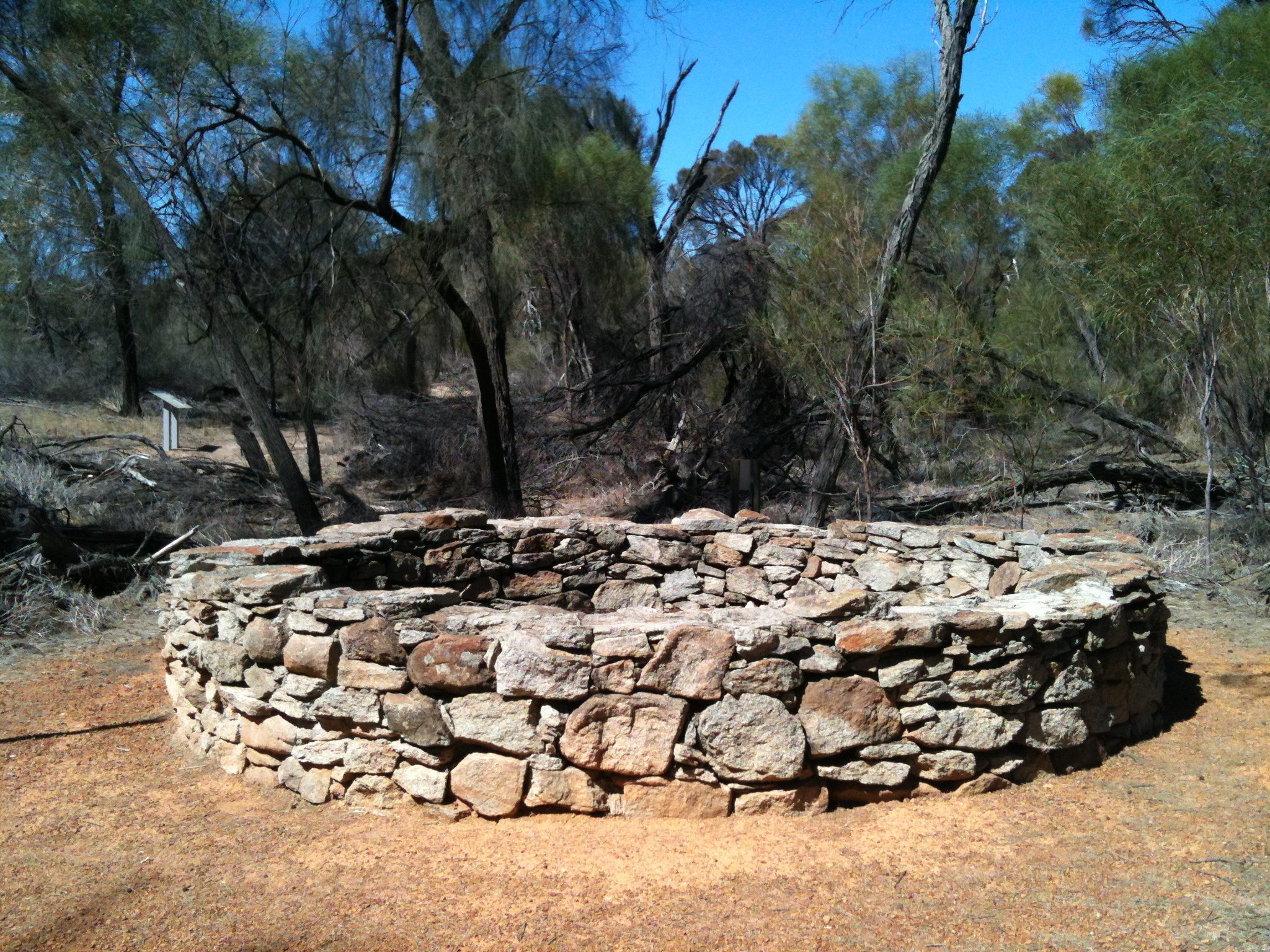
Stone Well near Kokerbin Rock

== See also ==
- Protected areas of Western Australia
- Granite outcrops of Western Australia

== Sources ==
- Hayes, Jill (n.d.). "Sights Worth Checking Out!". Visit Quairading (PDF). Shire of Quairading.
- "Kokerbin Rock". National Public Toilet Map. Department of Health, Disability and Ageing, Australian Government. 2026.
- "Kokerbin Rock". Shire of Bruce Rock. n.d.
