= Mount Wudinna =

Monolith in South Australia

Mount Wudinna is located near the locality of Wudinna, South Australia.

It is claimed to be the second largest monolith in Australia, Uluru being the largest, with Kokerbin Rock being the third largest.

It is listed on the South Australian Heritage Register.
