= National Public Toilet Map =

Map of public toilets in Australia

The National Public Toilet Map is part of the Australian government's National Continence Management Strategy (NCMS). The map allows more Australians with urinary and fecal incontinence problems to live and participate in their communities with dignity and confidence, by making it easier for them to find information about the location of public toilets.

The map was launched in September 2001. The map is internet based and can be accessed via a web browser or a free iOS app. It identifies more than 19,000 public and private toilets across Australia, including those in service stations and fast food outlets. The digital map also provides information on accessibility (access for disabled people) and opening hours for most of the toilets identified.

More than 3.8 million Australians are estimated to have continence issues, including families with young children. This represents 18% of the Australian population.

The map allows journey planning, including finding toilets near points of interest. Regular users of the web site can register and create their own customised web page, My Toilet Map, saving details of trips and localities for future reference. Registered users can also download toilets as waypoints to a Global Positioning System (GPS) device.

For journey planning a detailed map and written instructions are provided. Clickable icons go to details of the toilets including latitude and longitude to four decimal places, who provides the toilet and when details were last checked as well as all facilities, for example wheelchair access, opening hours, or whether the toilet has a Master Locksmiths' Association Key (MLAK). The MLAK is a master key that fits into specially designed locks allowing 24-hour-a-day access to public toilets. Eligible people, for example those with a disability, can purchase a key that opens all accessible toilets displaying the MLAK symbol. The symbols used comply with ISO 7001.

A similar project is the Great British Public Toilet Map.

== See also ==
- Restroom Access Act (in the US)
