= History of the minimum wage =

The history of minimum wage is about the attempts and measures governments have made to introduce, ascertain, uphold and enforce a minimum wage.

== Mesopotamia ==
Amongst the earliest minimum wage provisions were introduced in Mesopotamia during the reign of Hammurabi, with a minimum wage statute introduced in which the wages earned by artisans and other groups were set by law.

== India ==
Following its independence from Britain in 1947, a Minimum Wages Act was passed in India in 1948 that required Central or Provincial governments to fix minimum rates of pay to employees. Prior to this law, however, there was a long history in India of wage regulation to benefit workers. Wages in ancient India are said to have been high, with lawgivers emphasising (as noted by one study) “that the wages should enable the worker and his family to lead a normal standard of living.” The Arthashastra laid down that workers should be safeguarded from low pay and exploitation, with rulers being responsible for ensuring this. During the Mauryan period, for instance, the employees of factories under civil boards were paid fair wages by municipal boards. In Ancient India, according to one study, “Wages were decided on the basis of careful surveys of standard of living and cost of living.”

== New Zealand ==
New Zealand enacted national minimum wage laws in 1894 by the Industrial Conciliation and Arbitration Act, which, unlike the wages board of Victoria, established arbitration boards to enforce compulsory arbitration.

== Australia ==
In 1896, the Colony of Victoria amended the Factories and Shops Act to create a wages board. The wages board did not set a universal minimum wage; rather it set basic wages for six industries that were considered to pay low wages. First enacted as a four-year experiment, the wages board was renewed in 1900 and made permanent in 1904; by that time it covered 150 different industries.

By 1902, other Australian jurisdictions, such as New South Wales and Western Australia, had also formed wages boards.

In 1907, the Harvester decision was handed down in Australia. It introduced the influential idea of a 'living wage' for a man, his wife, and three children to "live in frugal comfort".

In 1912, the Industrial Arbitration Act of South Australia provided at section 22 that:

The Court shall not have power to order or prescribe wages which do not secure to the employee affected a living wage. "Living wage" means a sum sufficient for the normal and reasonable needs of the average employee living in the locality where the work under consideration is done or is to be done.

Following that law, the South Australian Industrial Court would periodically declare what a living wage was in South Australia, as follows:

| Date | Adult man's daily wage | In 2023 AUD |
|---|---|---|
| 5 September 1916 | 9 shillings | $54.19 |
| 24 October 1918 | 10 shillings and 6 pence | $56.11 |
| 25 June 1920 | 12 shillings and 6 pence | $51.88 |
| 15 July 1921 | 13 shillings and 3 pence | $62.94 |
| 11 April 1922 | 12 shillings and 11 pence | $63.47 |
| 19 October 1923 | 13 shillings and 1 pence | $62.84 |
| 30 April 1924 | 13 shillings and 8 pence | $66.39 |
| 29 July 1925 | 14 shillings and 3 pence | $69.22 |
| 11 October 1930 | 12 shillings and 6 pence | $61.42 |
| 17 August 1931 | 10 shillings and 6 pence | $57.55 |
| 12 April 1933 | 10 shillings and 6 pence | $63.22 |
| 18 October 1935 | 11 shillings | $63.55 |
| 18 December 1936 | 11 shillings and 7 pence | $66.02 |
| 4 November 1937 | 12 shillings and 4 pence | $67.59 |
| 19 December 1938 | 13 shillings | $69.47 |
| 9 November 1940 | 14 shillings | $70.41 |
| 12 November 1941 | 14 shillings and 6 pence | $69.65 |
| 30 September 1942 | 15 shillings and 8 pence | $69.04 |

On 14 December 2005, the Australian Fair Pay Commission was established under the Workplace Relations Amendment (WorkChoices) Act 2005. The responsibility of the commission includes the setting of the standard federal minimum wage, replacing the role of the Australian Industrial Relations Commission that took submissions from a variety of sources to determine appropriate minimum wages.

The Australian Fair Pay Commission was replaced by Fair Work Australia in 2010, later renamed the Fair Work Commission.

== France ==
A national minimum wage was introduced in France in 1950, although there is a long history in that country of governments attempting to regulate pay. In 1848, the first step taken to help low-paid workers was carried out when Parliament decreed (as noted by one study) “that the wages of subcontracted labour were to be investigated if the competent authorities deemed that workers were being unfairly remunerated.” Later, in 1898, a decree was issued that regulated wages in public works projects. Minimum wages were also advocated in the platforms of various Socialist parties in the late Nineteenth and early Twentieth centuries.

== United Kingdom ==
The minimum wage was a major factor in British industrial relations from 1909 until the 1930s.

Following a study of the minimum wage laws in Australia and New Zealand the Liberal Party acted to set up a minimum wage in the most heavily sweated or underpaid industries, as part of a broad range of social reforms. Winston Churchill, president of the Board of Trade, introduced the Trade Boards Act in 1909. It created boards that set minimum wage criteria that were legally enforceable. The main provision was to set minimum wages in certain trades with the history of low wages, because of surplus of available workers, the presence of women workers, or the lack of skills. At first it applied to four industries: chain-making, ready-made dresses, paper-box making, and the machine-made lace and finishing trade. About 70 per cent of their 200,000 workers were women.

Coal mining was added in 1912, following a major strike. In 1913, five additional wage boards were set up that covered Hollowware making, shirt making, sugar confectionery and food preserving, tin box making, and linen and cotton embroidery, along with a portion of the laundry industry. These extensions covered an additional 140,000 workers. Unions pushed for the 1918 Act to greatly extend the coverage of minimum wages. In 1917, "Whitley councils" or Joint industrial councils were established in 41 industries with over 2 million employees to bring together unions and management to discuss not only wages and conditions but also a wide range of related issues such as jobs, security, benefits and technical education.

Starting in 1909, Liberals, led especially by David Lloyd George, promoted the idea of a minimum wage for farm workers. Resistance of landowners was strong, but success was achieved by 1924. According to Robin Gowers and Timothy J. Hatton, the impact In England and Wales was significant. They estimate that it raised wages for farm labourers by 15 per cent by 1929, and by more than 20 per cent in the 1930s. It reduced the employment of such labourers by 54,000 (6.5 per cent) in 1929 and 97,000 (13.3 per cent) in 1937. They say, "The minimum wage lifted out of poverty many families of farm labourers who remained employed, but it significantly lowered the incomes of farmers, particularly during the 1930s."

By the 1920s, a new perspective was offered by reformers emphasising the usefulness of Family Allowance (later renamed "Child Benefit") targeted at low-income families to relieve poverty without distorting the labour market. The trade unions and the Labour Party adopted this view. In 1945, family allowances were introduced; minimum wages faded from view. Talk resumed in the 1970s, with an agricultural minimum wage remaining, but in the 1980s the Thatcher administration made it clear it would not accept a national minimum wage. Finally, with the return of Labour, the National Minimum Wage Act 1998 set a minimum of £3.60 per hour, with lower rates for younger workers. It largely affected workers in high turnover service industries such as fast food restaurants, and members of ethnic minorities.

== United States ==
In 1912, the state of Massachusetts, United States, set minimum wages for women and children, and several other states enacted similar protective laws. Under the Massachusetts laws, there was "the power only to investigate conditions and recommend changes". From 1912 to 1923, fourteen other States (along with Puerto Rico and the District of Columbia) enacted minimum wage laws of their own, although two (as noted by one study) “were repealed soon after enactment.”

It seems to me to be equally plain that no business which depends for existence on paying less than living wages to its workers has any right to continue in this country.

— President Franklin Delano Roosevelt, 1933, Statement on National Industrial Recovery Act.

In the United States, statutory minimum wages were first introduced nationally in 1938 by president Franklin D. Roosevelt.

In addition to the federal minimum wage, nearly all states within the United States have their own minimum wage laws with the exception of Alabama, Louisiana, Mississippi, South Carolina, and Tennessee. Twenty-nine states have a minimum wage that is higher than the federal minimum wage.

== Latin America ==
In 1930, Getúlio Vargas established a minimum wage in Brazil with a new set of work laws

In Mexico, the Constitution of 1917 decreed that "there shall be a minimum wage," but no enabling legislation was enacted until President Abelardo L. Rodríguez began pushing for it in August 1933. The minimum wage in Mexico was signed into law later that year, taking effect on 1 January 1934.

In the 1960s, minimum wage laws were introduced into Latin America as part of the Alliance for Progress; however these minimum wages were, and are, low.

== European Union developments ==
In the European Union, 21 member states currently have national minimum wages. Many countries, such as Norway, Sweden, Finland, Denmark, Germany, Austria, Italy, and Cyprus have (or had) no minimum wage laws, but rely on employer groups and trade unions to set minimum earnings through collective bargaining.

In July 2014 Germany began legislating to introduce a federally mandated minimum wage law, the Gesetz zur Regelung eines allgemeinen Mindestlohns (Mindestlohngesetz - MiLoG) (unofficial translation: "Act Regulating a General Minimum Wage (Minimum Wage Act)"), which came into effect on 1 January 2015. The minimum wage is set at €8.50 per hour. A French law passed in the National Assembly on 17 February 2015 and effective from the end of 2015 imposed statutory minimum wage regulations on foreign truck drivers plying international routes to and from France and undertaking cabotage in the country.

The European Commission introduced an infringement procedure against France and Germany on 19 May 2015, arguing that the application of these laws in the transport sector had a disproportionately restrictive impact on the freedom to provide services and the free movement of goods, two of the principal freedoms on which the European Union is based. On 16 June 2016 the Commission sent a letter of formal notice to the French authorities on this subject and issued a supplementary letter to the German authorities, initiating two months' notice of potential legal action.

== Switzerland ==
In May 2014, Switzerland was overwhelmingly defeated in a referendum concerning a proposal to set the minimum wage at 22 Swiss francs ($25), which would have given the country the world's highest minimum wage.

== See also ==
- Barriers to entry
- Labour law
- Minimum wage
- Training wage
