= Potty parity in the United States =

Potty parity laws. Law repealed.

Potty parity in the United States refers to laws and policies granting women and girls the right to equitable access to restrooms in public places and workplaces. Spearheaded by women workers, potty parity has long been a pillar of both the feminist movement and the labor movement. Prior to the passage of potty parity legislation, women's restrooms in many workplaces and public places were either absent or insufficient. Despite the passage of legislation, equitable access to public toilets remains a problem for women in the United States. No federal legislation relates to provision of facilities for women; however, Occupational Safety and Health Administration regulations stipulate "toilet rooms separate for each sex" unless unisex toilets are provided. States with active potty parity laws include Arkansas, Illinois, Kentucky, Massachusetts, Nevada, Tennessee, Virginia, Washington, and West Virginia. Some states, including Alabama, Minnesota, and North Carolina have repealed their laws.

== History ==
Plumbing codes in use in the USA: Statewide adoption of the International Plumbing Code Local adoption of the International Plumbing Code Statewide adoption of Uniform Plumbing Code Local adoption of Uniform Plumbing Code Other state or local codes used

In the late 1800s and early 1900s, during the Progressive Era, almost all states and territories passed laws granting women workers the right to have toilets and washrooms in their workplaces.

Prior to the passage of potty parity laws, many government buildings and workplaces lacked restrooms for women. The first restroom for congresswomen in the United States Capitol was opened in 1962. Facilities for female U.S. senators on the Senate Chamber level were first provided in 1992. In 2011 the U.S. House of Representatives got its first women’s bathroom near the chamber (Room H-211 of the U.S. Capitol). It is only open to women lawmakers, not the public.

The 2021 edition of the International Plumbing Code (in use by 35 states, Puerto Rico, Guam, and DC) requires single-occupancy toilets in public spaces to be labeled as unisex as individual states adopt the new edition of the code.

== Legislation by jurisdiction ==
=== Federal legislation ===
No federal legislation grants potty parity for women. Occupational Safety and Health Administration regulations call for separate restrooms for each sex, unless unisex restrooms are provided. Segregation of toilet facilities by race was outlawed in the United States by the Civil Rights Act of 1964. Provision of disabled-access facilities was mandated in federal buildings by the Architectural Barriers Act of 1968 and in private buildings by the Americans with Disabilities Act of 1990.

=== Summary of legislation by jurisdiction ===
Jurisdiction	Year(s) enacted	Year(s) repealed	Text
Alabama	1896	2015	
Alaska			
Arizona			
Arkansas	1919	Active	
California	1889; 1987		
Colorado		Active	
Connecticut			
Delaware			
Florida	1992	2011	
Georgia (U.S. state)			
Hawaii			
Idaho			
Illinois		Active	
Indiana			
Iowa			
Kansas			
Kentucky		Active	
Louisiana			
Maine			
Maryland			
Massachusetts	1887	Active	
Michigan	1895		
Minnesota	1893	1973	
Mississippi			
Missouri	1891	Active	
Montana			
Nebraska			
Nevada		Active	
New Hampshire			
New Jersey	1882		
New Mexico			
New York	1886		
North Carolina		1993	
North Dakota			
Ohio	1891		
Oklahoma			
Oregon			
Pennsylvania	1889		
Puerto Rico			
Rhode Island	1894		
South Carolina			
South Dakota			
Tennessee		Active	
Texas			
Utah			
Vermont			
Virginia		Active	
Washington, D.C.			
Washington (state)		Active	
West Virginia		Active	
Wisconsin			
Wyoming			

=== Alabama ===
Alabama's law that employers must provide "separate water closets for females" was first passed in 1896. The law was repealed in 2015.

=== Arkansas ===
Arkansas first passed potty parity legislation in 1919. As of 2024, Arkansas law says that "There shall be provided in every factory, manufacturing establishment, workshop, or other place where six (6) or more males and females are employed separate toilets and washrooms for males and females."

=== California ===
In 1889, California passed manufacturing legislation mandating "separate closets for the sexes where both are employed".

In 1987, California passed the Restroom Equity Act mandating that all new public projects include equitable restrooms for women.

=== Colorado ===
Code of Colorado Regulations require public toilets "separate for each sex at the rate of two for the first 100 persons and one for each additional 100 persons or fractional part thereof."

=== Florida ===
Florida's repealed statute 553.141 formerly stated that a "building that is newly constructed after September 30, 1992, and that is a publicly owned building or a privately owned building that has restrooms open to the public must have a ratio of 3 to 2 water closets provided for women as the combined total of water closets and urinals provided for men, unless there are two or fewer fixtures for men." Florida statute 553.86 now states that the "Florida Building Commission shall incorporate into the Florida Building Code, to be adopted by rule pursuant to s. 553.73(1), a ratio of public restroom facilities for men and women which must be provided in all buildings that are newly constructed after September 30, 1992, and that have restrooms open to the public."

=== Illinois ===
In Illinois, the Equitable Restrooms Act institutes standards to achieve potty parity, including "At least one women's toilet stall for every 200 persons in the maximum legal capacity of the place of public accommodation".

=== Kentucky ===
Kentucky law states that "In a building accommodating males and females, it shall be presumed that the occupants will be equally divided between males and females, unless otherwise denoted on the plan application documents."

=== Michigan ===
In 1895, Michigan passed a law stating that any factory where "women are employed shall be kept in a cleanly state and free from effluvia and a sufficient number of closets for the use of each sex shall be provided."

=== Massachusetts ===
In 1887, Massachusetts become the first state to require separate public toilets for males and females.

Massachusetts law states that in "every industrial establishment and railroad establishment there shall be provided suitable, adequate and convenient water closets and washing facilities, separate for each sex and plainly so designated" in accordance with Massachusetts regulations. The law also states that no person is permitted to use a restroom designated for the opposite sex. In 2016, this was clarified to allow people to use sex-segregated facilities consistent with gender identity.

=== Minnesota ===
In 1893, Minnesota passed a manufacturing law stating that "Properly screened and ventilated dressing rooms and closets shall be provided in all factories, mills, and other buildings in which both sexes are employed."

Minnesota's law was repealed in 1973.

=== Missouri ===
In 1891, Missouri passed legislation stating that "Establishments where women or girls are employed must contain suitable places for them to wash and dress if unclean work has been performed" and that "suitable and separate closets" must be provided for both sexes.

As of 2024, the Missouri Code of State Regulations stipulates that "The employer's policies and practices must assure the appropriate physical facilities to both sexes. The employer may not refuse to hire men or women or deny men or women a particular job because there are no restrooms or associated facilities." The code also states that the bona fide occupational qualification exception to Missouri discrimination law is not applicable to "the necessity of providing separate facilities of a personal nature, such as restrooms or dressing rooms."

=== Nevada ===
Nevada law states that employers "employing in the same building or on the same premises five or more males and three or more females" must "provide separate lavatories or toilet rooms for each sex" and must not "fail to designate the same plainly by a printed or painted sign on the door of the lavatory or toilet room so provided". Violation is a misdemeanor.

=== New Jersey ===
In 1882, New Jersey passed manufacturing legislation stating that "Separate closets must be provided for each sex."

=== New York ===
In 1886, New York passed manufacturing legislation stating that "Provision is made for separate closets and dressing rooms for women in establishments where they are employed."

=== North Carolina ===
North Carolina's law guaranteeing "separate toilets for sexes" was repealed in 1993.

=== Ohio ===
In 1891, Ohio passed legislation regulating manufacturing that stated that inspectors "can also demand suitable closet arrangements for the sexes, with toilet and dressing rooms for females on the floors on which they work."

=== Pennsylvania ===
In 1889, Pennsylvania passed manufacturing legislation stating that "Suitable and proper wash and dressing rooms and closets must be provided where women are employed. These must be properly screened and ventilated and kept in a clean condition."

=== Rhode Island ===
In 1894, Rhode Island passed manufacturing legislation stating that "Proper closets shall be provided in all places where women and girls work".

=== Tennessee ===
Tennessee law states that "All persons employing female employees in any manufacturing or mercantile establishment shall provide separate privies or water closets for the female employees" and that "No male person shall enter the separate privies or water closets except for the purpose of repairing or cleaning the privies or water closets." Violation of the act is a misdemeanor.

=== Virginia ===
Virginia law states that "Public gathering places required by Board regulation to provide toilet facilities shall provide without charge at least one toilet for each sex."

=== Washington ===
Washington state employment law says that "You must have an appropriate number of toilets for each gender, based on the number of male and female employees at your workplace. For example, if you have thirty-seven men and seventeen women, you need to have three toilets for the men and two toilets for the women".

=== West Virginia ===
West Virginia law states that "Every factory, mercantile establishment, mill or workshop shall be provided with a sufficient number of water closets, and whenever both male and female persons are employed, separate water closets shall be provided for the use of each sex, and plainly marked by which sex they are to be used. No person or persons shall be allowed to use the closets assigned to the opposite sex."

== See also ==
- Bathroom bill
- Potty parity
- Right to sit in the United States
- Unisex public toilet
- Workers' right to access the toilet
