= Rohmert's law =

Law used to calculate "maximum holding time" for any particular task

Widely used in the human factors and ergonomics field, Rohmert's law states that the maximum force one's muscles can exert decreases exponentially from the time one begins continuously exerting the force. It is commonly used to calculate "maximum holding time" for any particular task.

Maximum force decays exponentially due to the amount of energy (in the form of oxygen and ATP) the body is able to supply to the muscles. The circulatory systems keeps muscles flooded in nutrients at all times, so that muscles have a supply of fuel-ready to burn at any given moment. A task requiring maximum force burns a large amount of those nutrients at the onset of the task; the circulatory system is then unable to replenish the nutrients at a rate fast enough to maintain the maximum force for long. As a result, the maximum force the muscle is capable of producing is limited by the bottleneck in nutrient availability, and decreases exponentially.

Imagine a theoretical arm wrestling match with two perfectly matched opponents, each exactly as strong as the other. They both begin the match by exerting maximum force on each other's hands, but very soon, their arms get fatigued and the actual force being exerted on each other's hands drops off quickly. They are still exerting as much force as they can, but their muscles are burning energy faster than can be replenished, and their maximum force is decreasing exponentially. Eventually, their arms are completely fatigued; they are basically just holding hands and applying what little force their muscles can muster, wondering when the other will give up.

Rohmert's law suggests that, for example, static gripping loads be not more than 15% of the load required for a squeeze-operated tool.

While Rohmert's law applies to maximum force, the inverse is true as well; the less force one is asked to exert, the longer one will be able to exert that force before their muscles become fatigued. If one is asked to exert zero force, they can theoretically hold the position indefinitely.

Rohmert's law is true across all humans. While everyone has a different initial maximum force they can apply, their maximum force will decrease according to the same exponential curve as everyone else.
