= Restroom Access Act =

US legislation mandating toilet access

US states with Restroom Access Acts.

The Restroom Access Act, also known as Ally's Law, is legislation passed by several U.S. states that requires retail establishments that have toilet facilities for their employees to also allow customers to use the facilities if the customer has a medical condition requiring immediate access to a toilet, such as inflammatory bowel disease or Crohn’s disease.

== Background ==
The law is named for Ally Bain, a 14-year-old girl from Illinois who had a flare-up of her Crohn's disease while shopping at a large retail store and was subsequently denied use of the employee-only restroom, causing her to soil herself. Bain's mother vowed it would never happen to anyone else. The two met with Illinois State Representative Kathy Ryg, helped her draft a bill, and testified before a committee at the state capital. The bill was signed into law in August 2005, making Illinois the first U.S. state to do so.

As of January 2024, at least 20 U.S. states had passed versions of the law. They include Arkansas, California, Colorado, Connecticut, Delaware, Illinois, Kentucky, Louisiana, Maine, Maryland, Massachusetts, Michigan, Minnesota, New Hampshire, New York, Ohio, Oregon, Tennessee, Texas, Wisconsin, and Washington. A Virginia bill, which levies fines of $100 for non-compliance, was adopted in the 2024 General Assembly session and went in to effect on July 1, 2024.

There is support for a federal version of the act, but some small-business people object to the public using their employee bathrooms.

== Applicability ==
In general, each state requires that the customer present a document signed by a medical professional attesting that the customer uses an ostomy device or has Crohn's disease, ulcerative colitis, or other inflammatory bowel disease or medical condition requiring access to a toilet facility without delay. In at least two states, Oregon and Tennessee, the customer can present an identification card issued by a national organization advocating for the eligible medical condition.

Some states also include pregnancy as a covered medical condition.

== Sample law ==
The Restroom Access Act of Illinois states:

Sec. 10. Retail establishment; customer access to restroom facilities. A retail establishment that has a toilet facility for its employees shall allow a customer to use that facility during normal business hours if the toilet facility is reasonably safe and all of the following conditions are met:

(1) The customer requesting the use of the employee toilet facility suffers from an eligible medical condition or utilizes an ostomy device.

(2) Three or more employees of the retail establishment are working at the time the customer requests use of the employee toilet facility.

(3) The retail establishment does not normally make a restroom available to the public.

(4) The employee toilet facility is not located in an area where providing access would create an obvious health or safety risk to the customer or an obvious security risk to the retail establishment.

(5) A public restroom is not immediately accessible to the customer.

== Courtesy card ==
In Australia, the association Crohn's & Colitis Australia (CCA) encourages businesses to support people with such medical conditions by recognizing the Can't Wait Card issued by the CCA. The CCA states:

Crohn's & Colitis Australia (CCA) is inviting retailers, business owners and venue operators to show their support for people with the medical condition Crohn's and colitis, collectively known as inflammatory bowel disease (IBD), by displaying a window sticker recognising the Can't Wait Card in their store.

Other countries including the UK have similar programs of voluntary participation by businesses, one such program in the UK is the Bladder & Bowel Community's Just Can't Wait Card.

A card with no country specific indications is available explaining the possibility of legislation and the gravity of the card holders disability and need for restroom access.

== See also ==
- Workers' right to access the toilet
