= Potty parity =

Equitable provision of public toilets for men and women

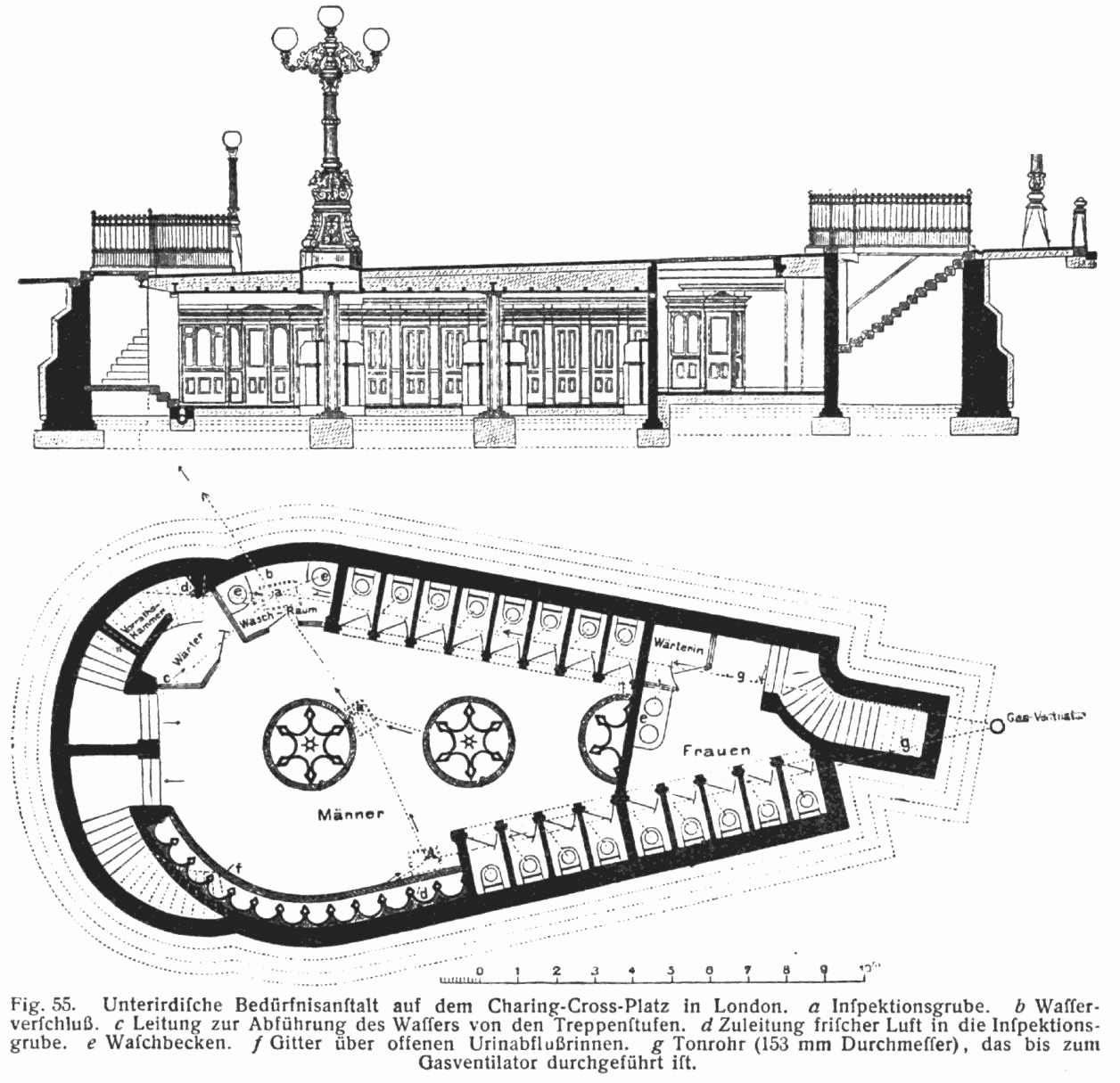
Section and plan of public toilets in Charing Cross Road, London, 1904. The men's facilities (left) comprise 12 cubicles and 13 urinals; whereas the women's facilities (right) comprise just 5 cubicles.

Potty parity is equal or equitable provision of public toilet facilities for females and males within a public space. Parity can be defined by equal floorspace or by number of fixtures within the washrooms, sometimes adjusted for the longer average time taken and more frequent visits to the washroom for females, among other factors.

Historically, public toilets have been divided by sex since the Victorian era. Male cubicles and facilities were typically greater in number until the late 1980s and early 2010s, depending on the country and building. Current ratios range from 1:1 to 4:1 female–to–male.

Portable, accessible, and vehicle toilets are commonly gender-neutral. Outside of these contexts, they are present in some European areas and university campuses in the US. Multiple studies have found that waiting times for females can be reduced by the use of properly designed washrooms.

== Definition of parity ==
Parity may be defined in various ways in relation to facilities in a building. The simplest is as equal floorspace for male and female washrooms. Since men's and boys' bathrooms include urinals, which take up less space than stalls, this still results in more facilities for males. An alternative parity is by number of fixtures within washrooms. However, since females on average spend more time in washrooms more males are able to use more facilities per unit time. More recent parity regulations therefore require more fixtures for females to ensure that the average time spent waiting to use the toilet is the same for females as for males, or to equalise throughputs of male and female toilets.

The lack of diaper-changing stations for babies in men's restrooms has been listed as a potty parity issue by fathers. Some jurisdictions have considered legislation mandating diaper-changing stations in men's restrooms.

== Sex differences ==
Women and girls often spend more time in washrooms than men and boys, for both physiological and cultural reasons. The requirement to use a cubicle rather than a urinal means urination takes longer and hand washing must be done more thoroughly. Females also make more visits to washrooms. Urinary tract infections and incontinence are more common in females. Pregnancy, menstruation, breastfeeding, and diaper-changing increase usage. The elderly, who are disproportionately female, take longer and more frequent bathroom visits.

A variety of female urinals and personal funnels have been invented to make it easier for females to urinate standing up. None has become widespread enough to affect policy formation on potty parity.

John F. Banzhaf III, a law professor at George Washington University, calls himself the "father of potty parity." Banzhaf argues that to ignore potty parity; that is, to have merely equal facilities for males and females; constitutes a form of sex discrimination against women. In the 1970s the Committee to End Pay Toilets in America made a similar point: that allowing toilet providers to charge for the use of a cubicle while urinals required no money was unfair to females.

Several authors have identified potty parity as a potential rallying issue for feminism, saying all women can identify with it.

== History and developments ==
Public toilets have historically been divided along the lines of sex, race, class, disability, and other distinctions. In apartheid South Africa and the Jim Crow American South, toilets were segregated by both sex and race. During the Victorian era in the United Kingdom, toilets were segregated by both sex and class.

=== U.S. ===
The first bathroom for congresswomen in the United States Capitol was opened in 1962.

Segregation of toilet facilities by race was outlawed in the United States by the Civil Rights Act of 1964. Provision of disabled-access facilities was mandated in federal buildings by the Architectural Barriers Act of 1968 and in private buildings by the Americans with Disabilities Act of 1990. No federal legislation relates to provision of facilities for women. The banning of pay toilets came about because women/girls had to pay to urinate whereas men/boys only had to pay to defecate.

In many older buildings, little or no provision was made for women because few would work in or visit them. Increased gender equality in employment and other spheres of life has impelled change. Until the 1980s, building codes for stadiums in the United States stipulated more toilets for men, on the assumption that most sports fans were male. In 1973, to protest the lack of female bathrooms at Harvard University, women poured jars of fake urine on the steps of the university's Lowell Hall, a protest Florynce Kennedy thought of and participated in.

The first "Restroom Equity" Act in the United States was passed in California in 1989. It was introduced by then-Senator Arthur Torres after several long waits for his wife to return from the bathroom.

Facilities for female U.S. senators on the Senate Chamber level were first provided in 1992.

Nissan Stadium in Nashville, Tennessee was built in 1999 in compliance with the Tennessee Equitable Restrooms Act, providing 288 fixtures for men and 580 for women. The Tennessean reported fifteen-minute waits at some men's rooms, compared to none at women's rooms. The Act was amended in 2000 to empower the state architect to authorize extra men's rooms at stadiums, horse shows and auto racing venues.

In 2011 the U.S. House of Representatives got its first women's bathroom near the chamber (Room H-211 of the U.S. Capitol). It is only open to women lawmakers, not the public.

== Regulations ==
Current laws in the United Kingdom require a 1:1 female–male ratio of restroom space in public buildings. The International Building Code requires range of female to male ratio of toilets depending on the building occupancy. Most occupancies require 1:1 ratio, but Assembly uses can require up to 2:1 ratio of female to male toilets. New York City Council passed a law in 2005 requiring roughly this in all public buildings. An advisory ruling had been passed in 2003. U.S. state laws vary between 1:1, 3:2, and 2:1 ratios. In theaters, the Uniform Plumbing Code specifies a 2:1 total fixture ratio (stalls and urinals combined) for smaller occupancy theaters, and varies between 1:1 and 2:1 depending on theater size, as the requirements for both genders scale at different intervals.

== Gender-neutral toilets ==
Gender-neutral toilets are common in some contexts, including on aircraft, on trains or buses, portable toilets, and accessible toilets. In parts of Europe they are also common in buildings. In the United States, they began to appear in the 2000s on university campuses and in some upmarket restaurants. Studies conducted by the University of Toronto's Rotman School of Management and by Ghent University have concluded that properly designed unisex restrooms can reduce waiting times for women.

In 2013, the state of California passed bill 1266 ("The School Success and Opportunity Act") requiring provision of facilities consistent with a pupil's gender identity.

== Examples ==
=== Canada ===
British Columbia's Factory Act stated that "The owner of every building used as a factory, shop or office shall provide separate washrooms for male and female employees with separate approaches to them, and signs clearly indicating for which sex the washrooms are provided."

Newfoundland and Labrador's Occupational Health and Safety Regulations, 2012 state that "where both males and females are employed, separate toilets shall be provided and suitably identified for workers of each sex".

Nova Scotia's Occupational Health and Safety Act requires that an "employer shall make accessible a minimum number of toilets for each gender, determined according to the maximum number of persons of each gender who are normally employed at any one time at the same workplace..."

Prince Edward Island's Occupational Safety and Health Act stipulates that "Where 10 or more persons are employed, the employer shall provide separate washrooms and toilet facilities for each sex with a locking device on the inside."

Saskatchewan's Factories Act of 1909 stipulated that "The owner of every factory shall provide a sufficient number and description of privies, earth or water closets and urinals for the employees of such factory, including separate sets for the use of male and female employees, and shall have separate approaches to the same, the recognised standard being one closet for every twenty-five persons employed in the factory."

The Six Nations of the Grand River First Nation enacted a potty parity measure for restaurants in 1967. The by-law stated that "There shall be provided for employees, toilets separate for each sex and at least one toilet room and one hand washing facility for customers of each sex of any restaurant designed to seat 25 or more customers..."

=== China ===
On 19 February 2012, some Chinese women in Guangzhou protested against the inequitable waiting times. This movement has drifted to Beijing, calling for women's facilities to be proportionally larger to accommodate the longer use times and ameliorate the longer queues of females. Since March 2011, Guangzhou's urban-management commission has ordered that new and newly renovated female public toilets must be 1.5 times the size of their male counterparts. The aforementioned movement is pressing for the regulation to be applied retroactively.

=== India ===
Provisions for separate toilets for women workers are found in Section 19 of the Factories Act, 1948; Section 9 of the Plantations Labour Act, 1951; Section 20 of the Mines Act, 1952; Rule 53 of the Contract Labour (Regulation and Abolition) Rules, 1971; and Rule 42 of the Inter State Migrant Workmen (RECS) Central Rules, 1980.

In 2011 a "Right to Pee" (as called by the media) campaign began in Mumbai, India's largest city. Women, but not men, have to pay to urinate in Mumbai, despite regulations against this practice. Women have also been sexually assaulted while urinating in fields. Thus, activists have collected more than 50,000 signatures supporting their demands that the local government stop charging women to urinate, build more toilets, keep them clean, provide sanitary napkins and a trash can, and hire female attendants. In response, city officials have agreed to build hundreds of public toilets for women in Mumbai, and some local legislators are now promising to build toilets for women in every one of their districts.

=== South Africa ===
South Africa's Standards Act, 1999 requires toilets separate for each sex at factories.

== See also ==
- Bathroom bill
- Potty parity in the United States
- Right to sit
- Unisex public toilet
- Workers' right to access the toilet
