= Workers' right to access the toilet =

The right to access a toilet is a basic human need. Unless both the employee and employer agree to compensate the employee on rest breaks an employer cannot take away the worker's right to access a toilet facility while working. There is limited information on the rights workers have to access public toilets among the world's legal systems. The law is not clear in New Zealand, United Kingdom, or the United States of America as to the amount of time a worker is entitled to use a toilet while working. Nor is there clarification on what constitutes a 'reasonable' amount of access to a toilet. Consequently, the lack of access to toilet facilities has become a health issue for many workers. Issues around workplace allowance to use a toilet has given light on issues such as workers having to ask permission to use a toilet and some workers having their pay deducted for the mere human right of using a toilet when they need to.

== Health effects ==
Inability to access a toilet when necessary has caused health issues such as urinary tract infections, kidney infections, and digestive problems which can later develop into severe health problems. Inadequate access to the use of a toilet when required can lead to substantial problems for people who have prostate problems, going through menopause, or are menstruating for instance.

Call centre workers are commonly encouraged to drink fluids regularly to continue prolonged voice use. However, these employees are generally deprived from accessing a toilet when they need to. Also, drivers such as bus and truck drivers on a timed schedule have been known to have no access to a toilet and thus have a high risk of coming in contact with bladder and stool health problems. Furthermore, the lack of access for a driver may result in a lack of concentration on the road, which is a public safety concern. The need to access a toilet becomes a larger issue than that for the individual who is being immediately deprived.

In 2002 a "Loo Breaks Study" conducted with 200 nurses at St Mark's Hospital, London found that over 75 per cent of the workers had difficulty passing stool at work given the high demand of the job disallowed them to take bathroom breaks. A third of the employees stated that management was regulated in such a way to prevent workers from taking loo breaks during their working hours. The study also found that half of call centre workers postponed taking toilet breaks during working hours due to management restrictions placed on them.

== By country ==
=== New Zealand ===
The Employment Relations Act in New Zealand states that an employee must be provided with rest breaks to attend to personal matters. Entitlements to visit the toilet cannot be contracted out of unless reasonably compensated for. However, the law does not state how the employer is to calculate the cost of compensation. Unless contracted out of, the Employment Relations Act states an employee must be provided with toilet breaks. In the absence of an agreement between the two parties, it is to be exercised in good faith. The statute allows an employer to take into account the employee's operational environment and the employee's duty to continuity of their services to their employer.

Employees are entitled to toilet breaks. However the law is yet to develop a specific allowance of toilet access. Here the law bargains on "good faith" which essentially refers to employees and employers not abusing the fact that there are no clear guidelines on the issue.

=== United States ===
In the United States, there is a history of denying workers the right to go to the toilet while on the job. The Occupational Safety and Health Administration (OSHA) Agency has undone some of the business opposition to workers taking toilet breaks. OSHA rules indicate that all employees must be provided with toilet facilities. However, issues arise over when a worker can access a bathroom. A memorandum on behalf of OSHA in 1998 stated that workers could only be restricted in accessing toilet facilities if it was reasonable at the given time. However, as seen in Zwiebel v. Plastipak Packaging what is reasonable is still unclear today. Mark Zwiebel was dismissed from his job at Plastipak Packaging in Ohio where he later sued the company on the grounds that they breached the restroom policy within OSHA's restroom service. The court held "While there is a clear public policy in favor of allowing employees access to workplace restrooms, it does not support the proposition that employees may leave their tasks or stations at any time without responsibly making sure that production is not jeopardized. In recognition of an employer's legitimate interest in avoiding disruptions, there is also a clear public policy in favor of allowing reasonable restrictions on employees' access to the restrooms."

Thus it is clear the court made this decision with policy in mind. The court was clear in its findings that an employee has an obligation to ensure they do not disregard their position as an employee and thus a reasonable restriction on the limitation a worker has to access a toilet is to be allowed. By going to the bathroom a worker cannot be seen to be deserting their job. However, this does raise issues over workers who have a large workload and that attending to the bathroom can be seen as abandoning one's job.

Currently, when an employment dispute arises regarding bathroom use where an employee has been prevented or punished in terms of employment, they are referred to OSHA who decides on each individual case. In addition, OSHA has ruled that where a worker has reasonably waited to visit a bathroom, or where an additional worker is not available, for replacement, in the worker's absence, then the worker is entitled to use the restroom or else the employer will be in breach of their fiduciary duties to the employee. Furthermore, employees must be paid for any break which equates to less than 20 minutes which includes bathroom use.

=== United Kingdom ===
In the United Kingdom, the law is unclear on whether an employer can deduct an employee's pay based on the fact they have accessed the toilet for more than 20 minutes in total over a period of six hours of more of work. The Employment Rights Act 1996 states that a worker cannot have their pay deducted unless it is authorised by statute or if the employee has consented in writing. Therefore, unless the employer has written in the worker's contract, or the worker has given written agreement, an employer cannot deduct pay for accessing a toilet. Moreover, an employer is legally allowed to contract out of a worker's right to access a toilet without pay; generally the contract will allow for compensation given the absence of such access. Furthermore, the law is unclear on whether a worker must ask for permission to use the toilet. Some workers have reported having to raise their hand, like a child in pre-school, in order for permission to be granted to simply exercise the basic human need to access a toilet. The above issues are currently gaining attention through the Trades Union Congress so that they may be addressed by Parliament and a specific allowance of access to toilets will be legally accepted. The Trades Union Congress stated a need for a "specific legal right to use toilets in the employer's time without a deduction in pay, and without any harassment."

In 2009, contact centre workers in Scotland Yard's control were being forced to record every visit they made to the toilet during their working hours. Workers reported they felt immensely offended and humiliated. Superintendent Russ Hanson-Coles claimed that requiring the phone operators to record their toilet visits as "code three" deterred them from taking unnecessary breaks. The term code three refers to any type of unscheduled break whether that being a toilet visit or the need to fill up a water bottle outside of the scheduled rest breaks. Furthermore, the Workplace (Health, Safety and Welfare) Regulations 1999 do not discuss access to toilets for workers but rather focus on the standard of sanitary conditions toilet facilities are required to be kept.

In 2014 information was revealed that a UK call centre worker had £50 deducted from their pay for using the toilet. The term "toilet tax" was raised in the House of Commons where former Employment Relations Minister Jo Swinson argued that terms must be clearly outlined in the employee's contract if deductions will be made for using the toilet while working. Furthermore, she stated employers must be cautious not to underpay an employee if they are already on the national minimum wage.

== See also ==
- Human right to water and sanitation
- Labor rights
- Occupational safety and health
- Potty parity
- Restroom Access Act

== Selected publications ==
Marc Linder and Ingrid Nygaard. Void Where Prohibited: Rest Breaks and the Right to Urinate on Company Time. Ithaca, NY: Cornell University Press, 1998
