= Right to sit in the United States =

Pieces of legislation for workers rights

The right to sit in the United States refers to state and local laws and regulations guaranteeing workers the right to sit at work when standing is not necessary. The right to sit, also known as suitable seating, was a pillar of the early labor movement. Between 1881 and 1917, almost all states, the District of Columbia, and Puerto Rico had passed legislation concerning suitable seating for workers. These laws were enacted during the Progressive Era, spearheaded by women workers in the labor movement. The majority of states and the District of Columbia repealed their right to sit laws between 1953 and 2015. Seven states and several cities have active, gender-neutral laws. In some workplaces, unionized workers have gained suitable seating provisions in their work contracts.

The original texts of these laws almost always applied only to women workers. Most states with right to sit laws have subsequently amended their laws to include all workers regardless of sex. Florida's law has always been gender-neutral. Some states allow seating accommodations for workers who are minors, disabled, or pregnant. There is no federal right to sit law, nor is the US a signatory to the International Labour Organization's Hygiene (Commerce and Offices) Convention, 1964, which contains a suitable seating provision. Disabled workers who qualify can request seating as a reasonable accommodation under the Americans with Disabilities Act. Pregnant workers can request seating under the Pregnant Workers Fairness Act. Low-income workers and workers without health insurance may experience difficulties acquiring a doctor's note to prove their disability status.

Largely obscure and rarely enforced for nearly a century, right to sit laws have obtained new relevance following several high-profile lawsuits against major corporations in California and other states during the 2010s and 2020s. States with current, gender-neutral right to sit laws include California, Florida, Massachusetts, Montana, New Jersey, Oregon, and Wisconsin. Some states, including New York, Pennsylvania, and West Virginia, maintain gendered language referring to female workers only, but the laws are not enforced. South Dakota's right to sit law only applies to minors. States that have repealed their right to sit laws include Alabama, Arizona, Arkansas, Colorado, Connecticut, Idaho, Illinois, Kansas, Kentucky, Maine, Maryland, Michigan, Missouri, Nebraska, Nevada, New Mexico, New Hampshire, North Carolina, Oklahoma, Virginia, Washington and Wyoming. Right to sit laws have been enacted at the local level in several cities, including Ann Arbor, Michigan and St. Louis, Missouri. Local laws have been repealed in some cities, including Baltimore, Chicago, Denver, Newport News, Norfolk, and Portland. Since 2019, state and local politicians in several states, including Hawaii, Illinois, Maryland, Michigan, Minnesota, New York, and West Virginia, have proposed legislation to enact right to sit laws or amend them to be gender neutral.

== History ==
Gender-neutral right to sit laws. Female-only laws. Right to sit law for minors. Law or regulation repealed. No law or unknown.

Right to sit in Northern America.

In the late 1800s and early 1900s, during the Progressive Era, numerous states, territories, and cities passed laws, minimum wage orders, and other regulations granting workers the right to suitable seats, specifically for women workers. According to a report by the sociologist Annie Marion MacLean, 22 states had passed suitable seating laws for women workers by 1897.

By 1915, only four states lacked a suitable seating law for women workers: Idaho, Mississippi, Nevada, and New Mexico. Principles of Labor Legislation, a foundational labor law text written in 1916 by John R. Commons and John Bertram Andrews, noted that an aspect of early 20th century labor reforms that is "[p]articularly striking is the special protection of women manifested in the laws on seats, toilets, and dressing-rooms." At the time, all right to sit legislation in the United States was gendered, applying specifically to women workers. They write that as "far back as the end of the 'seventies the dangers of constant standing for salesgirls were recognized, and it was urged that they be furnished seats and allowed to use them." They note that the first state to pass right to sit legislation for women workers was New York in 1881. By 1916, almost every state had such a right to sit law for women workers. Most state laws covered manufacturing and mechanical jobs, with some states covering virtually all jobs. Commons and Andrews claimed that these early right to sit laws were "of little real importance in protecting health...since it is practically impossible to see that employers and foremen allow the seats to be used even when provided."

By 1932, almost all of the states, the District of Columbia, and the territories of Puerto Rico and the Philippines, had passed laws requiring some form of suitable seating for women workers. The majority of states with right to sit laws specify that "suitable seats" be provided by employers and that workers be allowed to sit when standing is not required. The only state in the United States without a right to sit law by 1932 was Mississippi. North Dakota and New Mexico passed suitable sitting laws in 1920 and 1931, respectively.

In 1960, 46 states, the District of Columbia, and Puerto Rico had suitable seating laws. All applied only to women workers except Florida.

The 1965, Handbook on Women Workers published by the Women's Bureau Bulletin recommends, as a health standard, "Suitable seats in adequate numbers; workers free to use them when not actively engaged in performance of duties that require a standing position, or at all times when nature of job permits."

In 1969, 45 states, the District of Columbia, and Puerto Rico had suitable seating laws. They had been repealed in Delaware, Hawaii, Illinois, Maryland, and North Dakota, and had never been enacted in Mississippi.

By January 1st, 1982, 22 jurisdictions in the United States had right to sit laws. The laws had been amended to be gender neutral in nine states: California, Massachusetts, Oregon, Montana, Utah, New Jersey, Wisconsin, Florida, and Washington, D.C.

After largely falling into obscurity for nearly a century, these suitable seating laws have gained greater recognition due to multiple lawsuits in the state of California and other states during the late 2010s and early 2020s. In 2019, Safeway was ordered to pay a fine of $12 million (~$14.5 million in 2024) after a Santa Clara County, California cashier was denied the right to sit.

== Collective bargaining ==
Some labor unions have demanded suitable seating provisions in worker contracts as part of negotiations. The Retail, Wholesale and Department Store Union (RWDSU), which represents unionized Barnes & Noble workers, supports suitable seating provisions in worker contracts. Workers at Barnes & Noble's flagship Union Square location in Manhattan have been granted seating provisions in their employment contracts. RWDSU's president Stuart Appelbaum has said that seating provisions were previously won during negotiations with another company after union organizers removed all chairs from the room during a break in negotiations. Appelbaum stated, "The employer came back and saw we had removed all chairs from the negotiating table...I think the point was made."

== Legislation by jurisdiction ==
=== Federal legislation ===
There is no federal law requiring suitable seating for all workers. Qualifying disabled workers can request seating as a reasonable accommodation under the Americans with Disabilities Act. Pregnant workers can request seating under the federal Pregnant Workers Fairness Act. The Occupational Safety and Health Administration (OSHA) does not have a specific standard that requires that all workers be provided with suitable seating. OSHA permits states to develop their own occupational safety standards, as long as the standards are "at least as effective as" federal standards.

=== Summary of legislation by jurisdiction ===
Note: in cases where it is unknown if the legislation has been repealed or is still active, a "No" under the column for gender neutrality indicates that the legislation was not gender neutral when first enacted. The bills may or may not have been updated to be gender neutral since they were passed.

Jurisdiction	Year first enacted	Gender neutrality	Year repealed	Text
Alabama	1896	No	2015	
Alaska	?	No	?	?
Arizona	1912	No	1973	
Arkansas	1913	No	1997	
California	1911	Yes, 1974	Active	
Colorado	1885	No	1973	?
Connecticut	1893	No	2005	
Delaware	1887	No	1965	?
Florida	1899	Yes, always	Active	
Georgia	1889	No	?	?
Hawaii	?	No	?	?
Idaho	1913	No	1985	
Illinois	1901	No	?	?
Indiana	1891	No	1971	?
Iowa	1892	No	1972	?
Kansas	1901	No	1975	
Kentucky	1912	No	1972	
Louisiana	1900	No	1976	?
Maine	1911	No	1975	
Maryland	1896	No	1953	?
Massachusetts	1882	Yes, 1974	Active	
Michigan	1883	No	1975	?
Minnesota	1887	No	1973	
Mississippi				
Missouri	1885	No	2007	
Montana	1885	Yes, 1975	Active	
Nebraska	1883	No	1969	
Nevada	1917	No	1975	?
New Hampshire	1895	No	1985	
New Jersey	1882	Yes, 1980	Active	
New Mexico	1931	No	2009	
New York	1881	No	Active	
North Carolina	1909	No	1973	
North Dakota	1920	?	?	?
Ohio	1891	No	1982	
Oklahoma	1908	No	1991	
Oregon	1903	Yes	Active	
Pennsylvania	1887	No	Active	
Puerto Rico	?	No	?	?
Rhode Island	1894	No	1976	?
South Carolina	1899	No	?	?
South Dakota	1913	Yes	Active (minors only)	
Tennessee	1905	No	1972	?
Texas	1913	No	1985	?
Utah	1897	Yes	1991	?
Vermont	1915	No	1969	
Virginia	1898	No	1974	
Washington, D.C.	1895	Yes, 1976	2004	
Washington (state)	1890	No	1973	
West Virginia	1901	No	Active	
Wisconsin	1899	Yes, 1975	Active	
Wyoming	1901	No	1996	

=== Alabama ===
Alabama passed a suitable seating law for women workers in 1896. The suitable seating provision was recodified again in 1907, 1923, and 1940.

The suitable seating law for women workers was repealed on April 21, 2015.

=== Alaska ===
As early as 1954, Alaska law stated that "Wherever possible women shall be seated at their work, with stools or chairs provided with a backrest and contribute to good posture; when required to stand at their work for prolonged periods, chairs shall be provided for their use during rest periods."

=== Arizona ===
Arizona passed a right to sit law in 1912.

Arizona's General Construction Safety Code, 1957 prohibited women from working in mines, quarries, coal breakers, or other jobs that required standing. The law also stipulated that "Employers of females in any place or establishment must provide suitable seats, chairs, or benches and permit their use when females are not engaged in active duties."

Arizona's law was repealed in 1973. The article heading for the repealed article was removed from the Arizona law code in 2006.

=== Arkansas ===
Arkansas passed a suitable seating law for women workers in 1913. The law stated that in any "manufacturing, mechanical, mercantile and other establishment where girls or women are employed, there shall be provided, and conveniently situated, seats sufficient to comfortably seat such girls or women, and during such times as they are not required by their duties to be upon their feet, they shall be allowed to use the seats."

Arkansas's right to sit law for women workers was repealed in 1997.

=== California ===
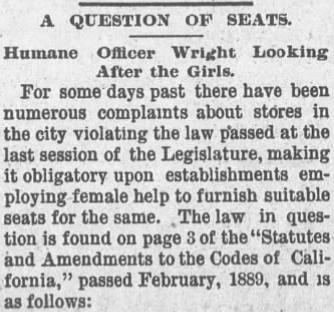
"A Question of Seats", Los Angeles Times, June 20, 1889.

California first enacted a suitable seating law for women workers in February, 1889.

In 1911, the California State Legislature passed a provision requiring all employers in the mercantile industry to "provide suitable seats for all female employees" and to allow them to "use such seats when they are not engaged in the active duties of their employment." Workers who are not "engaged in the active duties of their employment and the nature of the work requires standing, an adequate number of suitable seats shall be placed in reasonable proximity to the work area and employees shall be permitted to use such seats when it does not interfere with the performance of their duties."

The gendered provision in California's suitable seating law was struck down as discriminatory in federal court in 1974.

In addition to California's general right to sit law, California labor law also specifies that "When the nature of the work reasonably permits the use of seats, suitable seats shall be provided" for sheepherders and goat herders who are "working on or at a machine."

In 2016, the Supreme Court of California ruled in Kilby v. CVS Pharmacy, Inc. that workers whose jobs can be done while sitting down some or all of the time cannot be denied suitable seating. The class action lawsuit was brought by Nykeya Kilby, a CVS worker who was forced to stand while working.

In 2018, Walmart was accused of violating California law by refusing to allow their workers to sit. Walmart denied any wrongdoing, but agreed to pay $65 million in compensation to 100,000 current and former employees.

=== Colorado ===
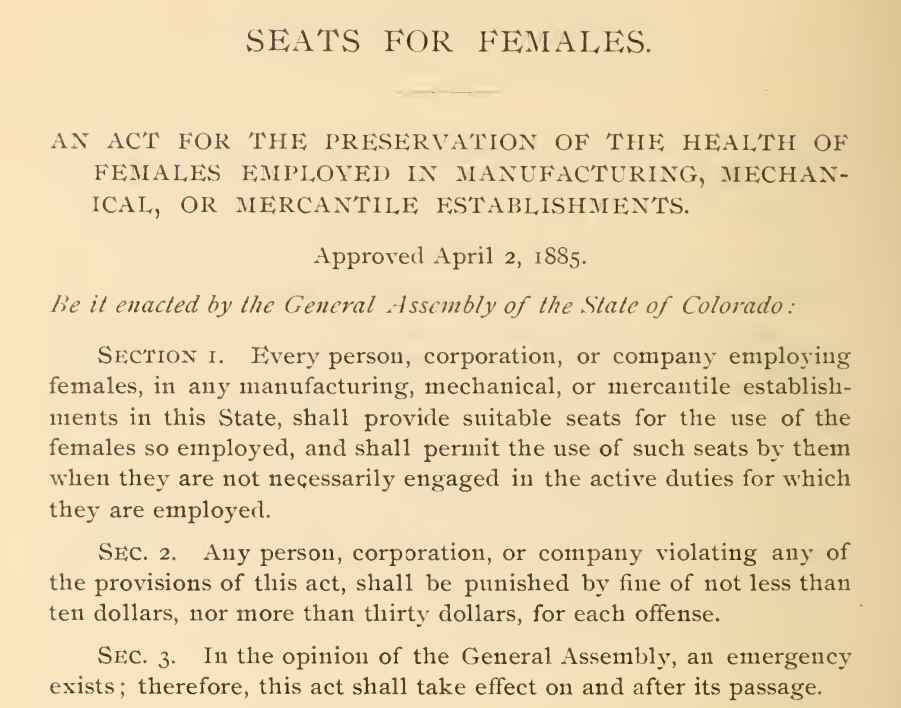
"Seats for Females" law passed in Colorado on April 2nd, 1885.

By 1898, Denver had a right to sit ordinance for women workers.

Colorado passed a statewide right to sit law for women workers in 1885.

In 1913, Colorado labor law required employers of women to allow them to sit while working, stating that "Suitable seats for the use of the women shall be provided in all manufacturing, mechanical, or mercantile establishments, and their use shall be permitted when the women are not necessarily engaged in the active duties for which they are employed."

In 1970, the Colorado State Legislature appointed a committee to consider laws relating to women and children. The committee recommended the repeal of suitable seating laws for women workers because the law might discourage employers from hiring women. The committee's report claimed that such laws "are so "unduly" protective that employment discrimination against women has developed."

Colorado's suitable seating law for women workers was repealed on June 7th, 1973, as part of an effort to ensure gender equality under Colorado law.

=== Connecticut ===
In 1893, Connecticut labor law stated that "[e]very person or company employing females in any mercantile, mechanical, or manufacturing establishment shall provide suitable seats for the use of all females so employed and shall permit the use of these seats by the females when they are not actively engaged in the duties for which they are employed." Employers who violated the law could be fined between $5 and $50.

In 2005, Connecticut repealed the right to sit law.

=== Delaware ===
In 1897, Delaware passed a right to sit law stating that "suitable seats should be provided for women employees In manufacturing" mechanical, or mercantile establishments and that the use of such seats 'should be permitted when the women were not necessarily engaged in the duties for which they were employed." Employers found to violate the law could be fined between $25 and $50.

Delaware repealed its right to sit law for women workers on December 14, 1965.

=== Florida ===
Florida enacted a right to sit law in 1899. Unlike most suitable seating laws of the time, Florida's law extended to all workers regardless of sex.

Florida Statute 448.05 protects a worker's right to sit. Merchants and shop-owners in Florida who require their workers to stand when not necessary, fail to provide suitable seating at their own expense to workers, or prohibit workers from making use of suitable seating, can be found "guilty of a misdemeanor of the second degree."

In 2011, an effort to repeal Florida's right to sit law was introduced by Democratic Representative Daphne Campbell. The bill passed the Florida House of Representatives, but died in messages and was not voted on in the Florida Senate.

=== Georgia ===
In 1889, Georgia labor law stated that it was a requirement for "persons or corporations employing females in manufacturing, mechanical or mercantile establishments to provide suitable seats, and permit their use by such females, when not necessarily engaged in the active duties for which they were employed."

=== Hawaii ===
A 1970 report mentions that the General Safety Code of the Territory of Hawaii had a suitable seating provision for women workers in 1957.

In 2023, a right to sit bill (SB876) was introduced in the Hawaii State Legislature. The bill was sponsored by Stanley Chang, Karl Rhoads, Michelle Kidani, and Maile Shimabukuro. The bill passed the first reading and was referred to the Labor and Technology and Judiciary Committees in January, 2023.

=== Idaho ===
Idaho labor law formerly required "employers in establishments where females are employed to provide suitable seats and permit their use when not engaged in active duties for which they are employed." The law was first passed in 1913.

Idaho's right to sit law was repealed in 1985.

=== Illinois ===
Illinois enacted a suitable seating law for women workers in 1901. In 1909, Illinois's law stated that "every person, firm or corporation employing females in any factory, mercantile establishment, mill or workshop in this State, shall provide a reasonable number of suitable seats for the use of such female employé [s], and shall permit the use of such seats by them when they are not necessarily engaged in the active duties for which they are employed..." The law was later repealed. According to a 1965 report, Illinois had no suitable seating law in that year.

In 1922, the Municipal Code of Chicago included a provision for suitable seating for women workers.

The Right to Sit at Work Act was introduced into the Illinois House of Representatives on 6 February 2025 as HB3249. The bill was submitted to the clerk by Representative Lilian Jiménez. In April, 2025, the bill failed to advance in the House prior to the third reading deadline. In the 2026 legislative session, the bill became eligible for a second reading and was approved by the Illinois House Labor and Commerce Committee and the Illinois House Rules Committee. An amendment to the bill was sent to the Labor and Commerce Committee.

=== Indiana ===
A suitable seating law for women workers in Indiana went into effect on March 6, 1891. The law stated "That every person or corporation employing women or girls in any business in this state shall provide suitable seats for the use of said employees so employed, and shall permit the use of such seats by them when they are not necessarily engaged in the active duties for the performance of which they are so employed."

In 1917, Section 2 of Indiana Senate Bill No. 140 stated that all employers in "any express or transportation company, laundry, hotel, public lodging house, place of amusement, restaurant, telephone, manufacturing, mechanical or mercantile establishments, employing any female person, shall provide suitable seats for all female employees and shall permit them to use such seats when same does not interfere with their employment."

The Indiana General Assembly voted to repeal the suitable seating law for women workers in 1971.

=== Iowa ===
Iowa enacted a right to sit law in 1892.

In 1922, Iowa labor law (Code 1939, sec. 1485) stated that "[a]ll employers of females in any mercantile or manufacturing business or occupation shall provide and maintain suitable seats when practicable for the use of such females at or beside the counter or work bench where employed, and permit the use thereof by such employees to such extent as the work engaged in may reasonably admit of." A 1922 report from the United States Department of Labor reports that such laws were difficult to enforce, "apparent from a study of their phraseology". Language such as "shall provide...when practicable" and "permit the use...to such extent as the work engaged in may reasonably admit of" are specifications which made enforcement difficult. The report claimed that seating arrangements at Iowa establishments in 1922 ranged from "workers stand all day" with "not a chair in sight" to "all of them sit all the time."

The report states that either extreme of sitting or standing can produce fatigue, depending on occupation. Over 100 Iowa establishments were found to have no suitable seating, despite the law's requirement. In 1924, a revision to the Iowa law added workshops to the establishments covered by the right to sit and established a fine of not more than $10 (~$188.00 in 2025) for employers found to violate the law.

As of 1970, Iowa law required "employers of females in workshops, mercantile, manufacturing or business establishments to provide suitable seats and permit their use when duties reasonably allow it."

Chapter 88.4 of the Iowa Code once included a right to sit provision, which was later repealed.

=== Kansas ===
Kansas enacted a suitable seating law for women workers in 1901.

The right to sit law for women workers in Kansas was repealed in 1975.

=== Kentucky ===
Kentucky enacted a suitable seating law for women workers in 1912. The law was recodified on October 1st, 1942. In 1972, the suitable seating law for women workers was repealed.

=== Louisiana ===
Louisiana enacted a suitable seating law for women workers in 1900.

Louisiana's RS 23:292, guaranteeing the right to sit, has been repealed.

=== Maine ===
Enacted in 1911, Maine's right to sit law for women workers was repealed in 1975.

=== Maryland ===
One April 4, 1896, the State of Maryland enacted legislation stipulating that a chair or stool be provided to women workers in mercantile establishments. Maryland's state law was less comprehensive than the City of Baltimore's law, as the Maryland state law did not apply to manufacturing establishments. Maryland's right to sit law provided that in "every retail, jobbing, or wholesale drygoods store, notion, millinery or any other business where any female salespeople are employed, a seat shall be provided for each one of such female help, and they shall not be forbidden to avail themselves of any opportunity of rest not interfering with their duties." A 1904 report from the Maryland Bureau of Statistics and Information cited Maryland's right to sit law as an example of a law with a "remedial character...which, if properly enforced, might prove of great advantage to the masses of the people", however the report notes that right to sit laws are "oft-times lost sight of because of the multifarious duties of the Police Department and the impossibility of a proper enforcement of such laws."

In 1898, the City of Baltimore approved a law requiring that every "employer of females in any mercantile or manufacturing establishment in the City of Baltimore must provide and maintain suitable seats for the use of such employees." Employers who violated the law could be found guilty of a misdemeanor and fined $150 upon conviction. While the law was well-known, in 1912 Elizabeth Beardsley Butler described the law's provisions as "vague and unsatisfactory in wording", a defect she thought was common among many right to sit laws in the United States.

Baltimore's suitable seating law was in effect as of 1956. Baltimore's suitable seating law for women workers was repealed on February 9th, 1970.

Maryland's suitable seating law for women workers was repealed in April, 1953.

In 2022, Maryland Delegate Vaughn Stewart introduced the Right to Sit Act (HB256). The measure was co-sponsored by delegates Marlon Amprey, Lorig Charkoudian, David Moon, Joseline Peña-Melnyk, and Sheila Ruth. The bill was withdrawn by the sponsor. The Maryland Women's Law Center said that the right to sit is often "unreasonably denied" and that the Right to Sit Act would be a "significant" improvement to workers' health and well-being while being an "inconsequential" change for employers. The Maryland State & DC AFL-CIO described the bill as a "simple measure" that could nonetheless be of legal importance in class action lawsuits.

The bill was opposed by the Maryland Retailers Association. Delegate Stewart sponsored the Right to Sit Act (HB0017) a second time, with the bill receiving an unfavorable report from the Economic Matters committee in 2023.

The bill was endorsed by the Kennedy Krieger Institute, which stated that suitable seating is an inclusive business practice that "increases employment outcomes for individuals with disabilities" and provides disabled people with greater employment opportunities they otherwise might not consider.

The bill was opposed by the Maryland Chamber of Commerce, which stated that the law was "unnecessary" because some disabled workers already have a right to sit under the ADA and because the bill's creation of a private right of action could subject "Maryland’s small businesses to additional liability that would add yet another degree of uncertainty in these already turbulent times."

=== Massachusetts ===
In 1882, Massachusetts labor law required that "Every person or corporation employing females in any manufacturing, mechanical or mercantile establishment in this Commonwealth shall provide suitable seats for the use of the females so employed", furthermore permitting the use of "such seats by them when they are not necessarily engaged in the active duties for which they are employed." Any employer found to have violated the right to sit could be fined between $10 and $30. The law was passed on 19 November 1881 and went into effect on 1 February 1882.

While the law was originally intended to protect "women and children", in 1974 the language of the law was amended to be gender neutral in order to protect all workers regardless of sex.

Massachusetts law currently states that "Employers shall provide suitable seats for the use of their employees and shall permit such employees to use such seats whenever they are not necessarily engaged in the active duties of their employment, and shall also provide for their use and permit them to use suitable seats while at work, except when the work cannot properly be performed in a sitting position or when such seats may reasonably be expected to result in an unsafe or hazardous working condition." Any employer who violates this law can be punished by a fine of between $50 and $200.

The Massachusetts Pregnant Workers Fairness Act grants pregnant workers the right to the "acquisition or modification of equipment or seating", which is considered a reasonable accommodation for pregnant workers. An employer cannot request medical documentation if a pregnant worker makes requests for seating.

=== Michigan ===
Michigan enacted a suitable seating law for women workers in 1883. The right to sit law for women workers was repealed in 1975. The law had stated that "[n]o employer of female help shall neglect or refuse to provide seats as provided in this act, nor shall make any rules, orders or regulations in their shops, stores or other places of business requiring females to remain standing when not necessarily in service or labor therein."

On September 16th, 2024, the City Council of Ann Arbor, Michigan, began considering the addition of a local right to sit ordinance to the city's non-discrimination code. The city council held an initial vote on the ordinance on October 7th, 2024, voting 11-0 in favor of advancing the ordinance. The vote on final approval was held on October 21, 2024. The ordinance was approved unanimously. Complaints will be handled by the Ann Arbor Human Rights Commission. Ann Arbor's ordinance is the first right to sit law in Michigan since the statewide law was repealed in 1975. The Small Business Association of Michigan stated that Ann Arbor's right to sit ordinance is "landmark" legislation that "marks a shift towards more inclusive workplace standards".

On September 26, 2024, Michigan Representative Dylan Wegela submitted House Bill 5983, proposing a statewide right to sit law. The bill has been referred to the Committee on Labor. If the bill is passed, reported violations would be handled by the Department of Labor and Economic Opportunity.

=== Minnesota ===
Minnesota passed a right to sit law for women workers in 1887. The law stated that it "shall be the duty of all employers of females in any mercantile or manufacturing business or occupation to provide and maintain suitable seats for the use of such female employes, and to permit the use of such seats by such employes to such an extent as may be reasonable for the preservation of their health."

Minnesota's right to sit law remained in effect as of 1967.

Minnesota's right to sit law for women workers was repealed in 1973.

In 2024, a group of union workers at the Walker Art Center in Minneapolis took to social media to protest the art gallery's no-sitting policy. In response to the denial of seating at the Walker Art Center, state legislators introduced a right to sit bill in the state legislature. On February 26, 2026, HF 3796 was introduced in the Minnesota Legislature. If enacted, the bill would require that an "employer must provide suitable seating for employees and must permit the use of those seats by employees when the nature of the work reasonably permits the use of seats."

=== Mississippi ===
By 1932, Mississippi was the only state in the United States that didn't have some form of right to sit law. By December of 1944, Mississippi still had no right to sit law.

=== Missouri ===
Missouri passed a right to sit law for women workers in 1885.

In 1973, the Missouri Attorney General ruled that employers must provide seating for both sexes, or in cases where standing was necessary, no seating for either sex.

Missouri's right to sit law was repealed on August 28, 2007.

The St. Louis Code of Ordinances mandated that "all employers of females in any mercantile business or occupation to provide and maintain suitable seats for the use of female employees, at or beside the counter or work bench where employed, and to permit the use of seats by employees to an extent as may be reasonable for the preservation of their health." Any employer found to have violated this provision is guilty of a misdemeanor. In 1973, the ordinance was modified to be gender neutral, stating that "An employer must provide seats for all employees or prove that business necessity precludes such seats and not provide them for any employees."

=== Montana ===
Montana enacted a right to sit law for women workers in 1885.

Montana's right to sit law was amended to be gender neutral in 1975.

Montana labor law currently states that employers "shall provide suitable seats for all employees and shall permit them to use such seats when they are not employed in the active duties of their employment." Employers found violating this provision can be found guilty of a misdemeanor and upon conviction fined between $50 and $200, imprisoned in the county jail between 10 and 60 days, or be both fined and imprisoned.

=== Nebraska ===
Nebraska enacted a suitable seating law for women workers in 1883. The law applied to women workers in stores, offices, and educational institutions. In 1899, without reference to the 1883 law, another law was passed granting the right to sit for women workers in manufacturing, mercantile, and mechanical establishments, as well as restaurant and hotel workers. A 1913 amendment to the 1883 law included factory workers. In 1919, an amendment to the 1913 act extended the right to sit to all women workers.

Nebraska's suitable seating law was repealed on April 28, 1969. Legislative Bill 411 to "Repeal Preference Statutes Based on Sex" was introduced by state legislator Fern Hubbard Orme.

The Nebraska Fair Employment Practice Act lists sitting as a reasonable accommodation "with respect to pregnancy, childbirth, or related medical conditions".

=== Nevada ===
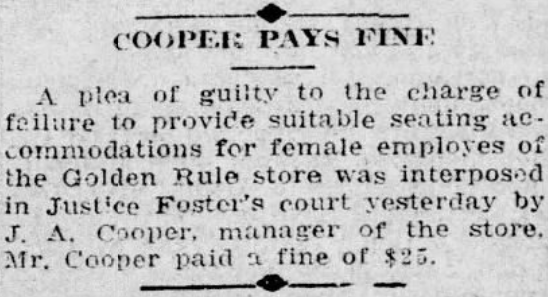
A notice in the Nevada State Journal of an employer fined for violating Nevada's suitable seating law, January 3, 1920.

On February 14, 1917, Nevada passed a right to sit law for women workers. The legislation stated that an "employer in any manufacturing, mechanical, or mercantile establishment, laundry, hotel, or restaurant, or other establishment, employing any female, shall provide suitable seats for all female employees, and shall permit them to use such seats when they are not engaged in the active duties of their employment."

In 1975, the suitable seating provision in Chapter 609 of the Nevada Revised Statutes was repealed.

=== New Hampshire ===
New Hampshire labor law formerly required that suitable seating be provided by employers to women workers in all manufacturing, mechanical, or mercantile establishments, and the use of such seats must be permitted.

A 1955, amendment to New Hampshire's occupational health and safety law granted the right to suitable seating for female workers at all commercial establishments.

New Hampshire's right to sit law was repealed in 1985.

=== New Jersey ===
New Jersey enacted a right to sit law for women workers in 1882.

The right to sit law in New Jersey was made gender neutral in 1980.

New Jersey labor law states that all employers "in any manufacturing, mechanical or mercantile establishment or in the services and operations incident to any commercial employment shall provide and maintain suitable seats conveniently situated and shall permit the use of such seats by employees at all times except when necessarily engaged in the discharge of duties that cannot properly be performed in a sitting position."

=== New Mexico ===
New Mexico labor law formerly stated that all employers with women workers "shall provide and furnish suitable seats, to be used by such employees when not engaged in the active duties of their employment, and shall give notice to all such female employees by posting in a conspicuous place, on the premises of such employment in letters not less than one inch in height, that all such female employees will be permitted to use seats when not so engaged." Employers found violating the law can be found guilty of a misdemeanor and fined between $50 and $200 per violation.

New Mexico's suitable seating law was repealed in 2009.

=== New York ===
In 1881, New York became the first state in the US to pass right to sit legislation for women workers. New York labor law states that a "sufficient number of suitable seats, with backs where practicable, shall be provided and maintained in every factory, mercantile establishment, freight or passenger elevator, hotel and restaurant for female employees who shall be allowed to use the seats to such an extent as may be reasonable for the preservation of their health." Factory workers "shall be allowed to use such seats whenever they are engaged in work which can be properly performed in a sitting posture", while workers in the mercantile industry must be provided one seat for every three workers and "if the duties of such employees are to be performed principally in front of a counter, table, desk or fixture, such seats shall be placed in front thereof" or behind as needed.

In 2019-2020, New York Assembly Bill A7649 was proposed to amend the state's right to sit law to cover all workers regardless of sex.

In 2022, New York State Senators Rachel May and Alessandra Biaggi proposed the "Standing is Tiring (SIT) Act" that would require suitable seating for all workers regardless of sex. The bill is in the New York Senate Labor Committee as of 2023.

=== North Carolina ===
North Carolina enacted a right to sit law in 1909. The law stated that "persons, firms, or corporations who employ females in a store, shop, office, or manufacturing establishment, as clerks, operators, or helpers in any business, trade, or occupation carried on or operated in the state of North Carolina, shall be required to procure and provide proper and suitable seats for all such females, and shall permit the use of such seats, rests, or stools as may be necessary, and shall not make any rules, regulations, or orders preventing the use of such seats, stools or rests when any such female employee or employees are not actively employed or engaged in their work in such business or employment." Any employer found to have violated the law could be found guilty of a misdemeanor and upon conviction fined between $25 and $100 per the discretion of the court.

North Carolina's suitable seating law for women workers was repealed in 1973.

=== North Dakota ===
North Dakota issued a suitable seating order for women workers in 1920 and again in 1922. North Dakota was one of the last states to mandate suitable seating for women workers. The order was later repealed. A 1965 report mentions that North Dakota had no suitable seating law.

=== Ohio ===
In Jones Co. v. Walker, decided on March 9, 1971, Ohio's gendered provisions in its right to sit law were ruled by the Franklin County Court of Common Pleas to be a form of sex discrimination favoring female workers over male workers, thereby being a violation of Title VII of the Civil Rights Act of 1964.

Ohio's right to sit law was repealed in 1982.

=== Oklahoma ===
Oklahoma enacted a right to sit law for women workers in 1908.

Section 3732 of Oklahoma's Revised Laws of 1910 stated that child workers were allowed the right to sit and that "the employer must provide suitable seats and permit their use so far as the nature of the work allows."

In 1991, a proposal was made to amendment Oklahoma's right to sit law to be gender neutral. Instead, the law was repealed.

=== Oregon ===
Oregon enacted a right to sit law for women workers on 19 February 1903, due to activism from the labour movement.

Oregon labor law guarantees the right to suitable seating for minors while working. Minors in cannery operations are granted one seat for every three minor workers. Suitable seating is defined as "convenient, comfortable and safe seats where the work is such that minors may sit while working."

The Oregon Administrative Rules states that every "employer shall provide to each employee when required by the nature of the work, suitable seats, suitable tables, and suitable work benches." Suitable seating is defined as "convenient, comfortable and safe seats where the work is such that employees may sit while working." In cannery operations, workers must be granted one seat for every three workers. Suitable tales and benches are defined by the law as "tables and work benches so constructed as to give the greatest possible comfort and convenience to employees where the nature of the work and the safety and convenience of the employee requires a bench or table."

The City of Portland formerly had a local law stipulating that every "employer in any manufacturing or mercantile establishment, store, department store, laundry, hotel or restaurant or other establishments shall provide for all employees a sufficient number of suitable seats, which in no case shall be less than one seat for each three employees, and shall permit them to use such seats when such employees are not engaged in active duties of their employment." The law was repealed on January 1, 2025.

In the Portland metropolitan area, unionized New Seasons Market workers affiliated with the United Electrical, Radio and Machine Workers of America's New Seasons Labor Union have gained "reasonable seating" under their Collective Bargaining Agreement. Reasonable seating is defined as "a seat that permits the safe performance of a task from a seated position."

=== Pennsylvania ===
Pennsylvania enacted a suitable seating law for women workers in 1887. The current suitable seating law, dating to 1917, states that all persons "employing or permitting females to work in any establishment shall provide suitable seats for their use conveniently assessable while they are working, and shall maintain and keep them there, and shall permit the reasonable use thereof by such females. At least one seat shall be provided for every five females employed or permitted to work."

According to a 1983 report from the U.S. Women's Bureau, the Pennsylvania Attorney General had ruled that the repeal of the women's seating requirement was implied by the passage of the State Human Relations Act.

Pittsburgh's City Code includes guidance on rights and reasonable accommodations for pregnant workers. The code mandates "Permitting the [pregnant] employee to sit during shifts, or providing a stool at their work station."

=== Puerto Rico ===
According to a 1969 report from the U.S. Women's Bureau, Puerto Rico had a suitable seating law in that year.

=== Rhode Island ===
Rhode Island enacted a suitable seating law for women workers in 1894.

Rhode Island law lists seating as a reasonable accommodation for pregnant workers.

=== South Carolina ===
South Carolina enacted a suitable seating law for women workers in 1899. South Carolina's law only applied to women workers in mercantile occupations.

=== South Dakota ===
South Dakota enacted a suitable seating law for women workers in 1913.

South Dakota labor law guarantees the right to suitable seating for child workers, stating that "any mercantile or manufacturing establishment, hotel, or restaurant where children are employed, suitable seats shall be maintained in the room where such employees work and such use thereof permitted as may be necessary for preservation of the health of such employees". Employers found guilty of violating this provision can be convicted of a Class 2 misdemeanor.

=== Tennessee ===
The Tennessee General Assembly passed a suitable seating law for women workers on March 31st, 1905 and which was approved on April 4th, 1905.

The Tennessee Pregnant Workers Fairness Act grants seating accommodations to pregnant workers.

=== Texas ===
In 1913, Texas "required that suitable seats be provided for women employees in any manufacturing, mechanical, or mercantile establishment, workshop, laundry, printing office, dressmaking or millinery establishment, hotel, restaurant, theater; telegraph or telephone establishment and office, or any other establishment. The use of these seats was to be permitted when the women were not engaged in the duties of their employment." The law exempted women stenographers and pharmacists and did not apply to residents of cities with a population under 5,000. Employers who violated the law could be fined between $50 and $200, be imprisoned from 5 to 30 days, or be both fined and imprisoned. A subsequent legislative act in 1915 further covered "any factory, mine, mill, workshop, mechanical or mercantile establishment, laundry, hotel, restaurant, rooming' house, theater or moving-picture show, barber shop, telegraph, telephone, or other office, express or transportation company, any State institution, or any other establishment, institution, or enterprise where women are employed." Employers were required to furnish the seating as well as post notices alerting workers of their right to sit. The 1915 law further exempted telegraph and telephone company workers and mercantile workers in rural areas with a population under 3,000.

The suitable seating law for women workers was repealed in 1985.

=== Utah ===
Utah enacted a suitable seating law for women workers in 1897.

Utah's suitable seating law was repealed in 1991.

=== Vermont ===
Vermont enacted a suitable seating law in 1915. The law stated that "seats must be provided in mercantile establishments, stores, shops, hotels and restaurants where women or girls are employed, and the use of these seats must be permitted".

The Vermont General Assembly voted to repeal the right to sit law for women workers in 1969. The repeal went into effect on March 27th, 1970.

=== Virginia ===
In Virginia, some of the earliest labor laws were passed to protect women workers. 1897-98 Va. Acts 45 required employers to grant women workers suitable seating when not performing work that necessitates standing. Virginia's law stated that "chairs, stools, or other suitable seats shall be maintained in all factories, shops, mills, laundries, mercantile and manufacturing establishments, except fruit and vegetable canning factories, for the use of female employees therein to the number of at least one seat for every three females employed, and the use thereof by such employees shall be allowed at such times and to such extent as may be necessary for the preservation of their health. Such seats shall be placed where the work of such females is to be principally performed, whether in front of or behind a counter, table, desk, or other fixture." An employer found to have violated the law could be found guilty of a misdemeanor and upon conviction be fined up to $25 and costs determined by the discretion of the court.

Virginia's suitable seating law was repealed in 1974.

The city of Norfolk, Virginia, passed a suitable seating ordinance for women workers on November 22, 1894.

=== Washington, D.C. ===
In 1895, the United States Congress passed a law for the District of Columbia "providing that all persons who employ women in stores, shops, offices or manufactories as clerks, assistants, operatives, or helpers in any business, trade, or occupation are required to procure and provide proper and suitable seats for all their women employees and to permit the use of these seats when the women are not actively employed in their work".

As of 1961, Washington, D.C., required employers of women to "provide proper and suitable seats for them, and to permit their use when not actively engaged in duties".

By 1998, the law stipulated for all employers to "provide and procure proper and suitable seats for all such employees" and that employers must not make "any rules, regulations or orders preventing the use of such stools or seats when any such employees are not actively employed in their work" (D.C. Code §36-901).

The capital's right to sit law was made gender neutral in 1976. It was repealed by an act of Congress in 2004.

The 2014 Protecting Pregnant Workers Fairness Act states that "purchasing or modifying work equipment, such as chairs" is a reasonable accommodation for pregnant workers in D.C.

=== Washington state ===
Washington enacted a right to sit law for women workers in 1890. The law was amended in 1911. The law required that "every employer in establishments where females are employed shall provide suitable seats for them and permit their use". Washington's law was repealed in 1973.

Washington state law states that "providing seating or allowing the employee to sit more frequently if her job requires her to stand" is a "reasonable accommodation" for pregnant workers.

=== West Virginia ===
West Virginia labor law states that every "person, firm or corporation employing females in any factory, mercantile establishment, mill or workshop in this state shall provide a reasonable number of suitable seats for the use of such female employees, and shall permit the use of such seats by them when they are not necessarily engaged in active duties for which they are employed, and shall permit the use of such seats at all times when such use would not actually and necessarily interfere with the proper discharge of the duties of such employees, and, where practicable, such seats shall be made permanent fixtures and may be so constructed or adjusted that, when not in use, they will not obstruct such female employee when engaged in the performance of her duties."

In 2020, West Virginia Delegate Sean Hornbuckle introduced House Bill 4909 to amend West Virginia's right to sit law to include all workers regardless of sex or occupation.

=== Wisconsin ===
The Wisconsin Legislature enacted a right to sit law in 1899.

In 1942, the law stated that "[e]very person or corporation employing females in any manufacturing, mechanical or mercantile establishment in the state of Wisconsin shall provide suitable seats for the females so employed, and shall permit the use of such seats by them when they are not necessarily engaged in the active duties for which they are employed." Any employer convicted of violating this provision could be found guilty of a misdemeanor and fined between $10 and $30.

Wisconsin's right to sit law became gender neutral in 1975. The text of the law was amended again in 1997 by Assembly Bill 683, with minor changes to the wording.

The current Wisconsin law mandating suitable sitting does not contain gendered language referring to female workers, stating that employers "in any manufacturing, mechanical or mercantile establishment in this state shall provide suitable seats for its employees, and shall permit the use of those seats by its employees when the employees are not necessarily engaged in the active duties for which they are employed." The fine for an employer who violates the provision remains between $10 and $30.

=== Wyoming ===
In 1901, Wyoming passed labor legislation (Acts 1901, C. 33) stipulating that suitable seating be "required in manufacturing, mechanical or mercantile establishments."

In 1915, Wyoming's suitable seating laws granted seating only for girls under the age of 18. The law stipulated that "No girl under 18 shall be employed where compelled to stand constantly; employers required to provide seats for girls under 18."

Wyoming's suitable seating law for girls was repealed in 1996.

== Accommodations ==
Federal law protects the right to sit for pregnant workers and disabled workers who qualify. There is no federal law granting a right to sit for minor workers. Supporters of right to sit laws note that pregnant workers and disabled workers may not wish to disclose to an employer that they are pregnant or disabled, and therefore right to sit laws also protect the privacy of those workers. Suitable seating law supporters also note that the right to sit grants pregnant and disabled workers immediate relief, as the process of approval for reasonable accommodation takes time. Maryland Delegate Vaughn Stewart has stated that the process of approval can be "onerous" as well as "embarrassing" to workers who do not wish to disclose their disability. Low-income workers and workers who do not have health insurance may face difficulties acquiring a doctor's note in order to prove that they have a disability. The process for obtaining a reasonable accommodation typically requires workers to initiate requests for accommodation.

=== Disabled workers ===
In 2019, Crossmark, Inc. of Texas was ordered by the Equal Employment Opportunity Commission (EEOC) to pay $2.65 million in a disability settlement. The business restricted workers to only being allowed to sit for 10 minutes at a time every 2 hours, regardless of medical condition or disability. The EEOC ruled that these restrictions violated the Americans with Disabilities Act of 1990 (ADA), which requires employers to provide reasonable accommodations to disabled workers.

Some states grant seating accommodations for disabled workers.

=== Minor workers ===
Some states have suitable seating laws that specifically apply to minors, including Oregon and South Dakota. Oregon has laws guaranteeing the right to sit for all workers as well as for minor workers. Oklahoma formerly had a right to sit laws for minor workers.

=== Pregnant workers ===
The Pregnant Workers Fairness Act of 2023 grants pregnant workers a right to seating accommodations under federal law. The EEOC has ruled that the right to sit and the right to stand for pregnant workers almost never constitutes an undue hardship for employers.

Laws in some jurisdictions state that sitting is a reasonable accommodation for pregnant workers and workers with pregnancy-related or childbirth-related medical conditions, including Massachusetts, Nebraska, Rhode Island, Tennessee, Washington state, and Washington, D.C.

Some city codes also protect seating accommodations for pregnant workers, including Pittsburgh.

== Criticism of gendered provisions ==
Professor Carol Louw of the University of South Africa claims that female-specific provisions in right to sit laws "reinforced stereotypes regarding women's frailty." Law professors Sacha Prechal and Noreen Burrows argued against sex-specific provisions in right to sit laws because "working conditions should be as safe and as pleasant as possible for all employees" regardless of sex.

== Opposition to the right to sit ==
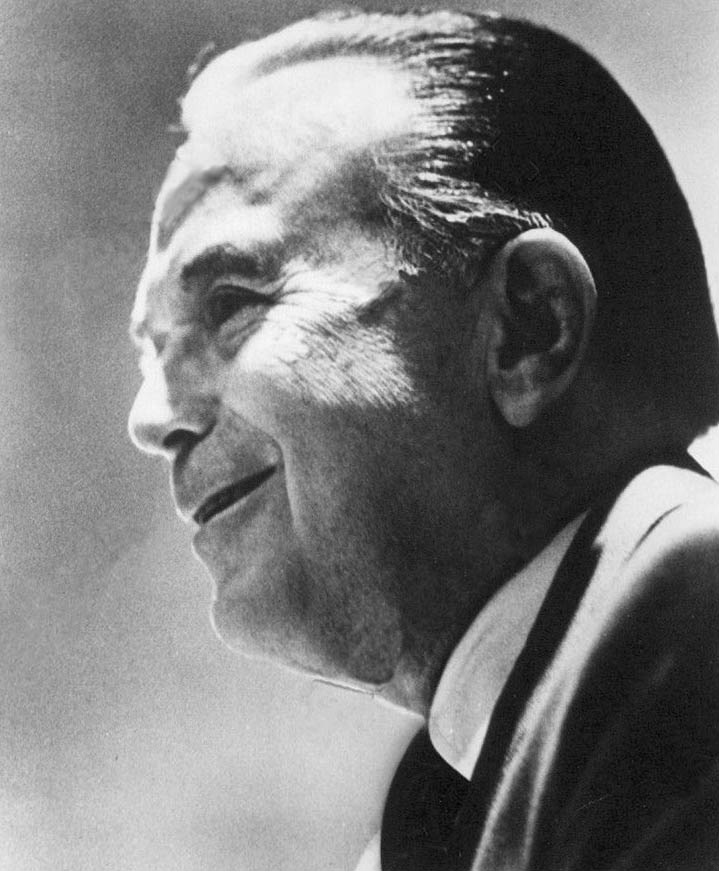
Former McDonald's CEO Ray Kroc, who popularized the phrase "If you've got time to lean, you've got time to clean."

American corporations have strongly opposed right to sit laws. According to John Logan, the director of Labor and Employment Studies at San Francisco State University, corporate opposition to these laws is "about maintaining unilateral control of the workplace" and maintaining "flexibility" for owners to do what they want. Many employers, often in retail, require workers to stand for the duration of their shift due to the belief that sitting is inefficient, looks unprofessional, or is unsuitable for the nature of the work.

Ray Kroc, the former CEO of McDonald's, was critical of workers sitting or leaning while at work. In the 1960s, Kroc often used the catchphrase "If you’ve got time to lean, you’ve got time to clean." According to Jacobin writer Alex N. Press, the catchphrase has become popular with managers.

The American Tort Reform Association's "Judicial Hellholes" program has denounced California's suitable seating law for allegedly protecting "lazy cashiers and their opportunistic lawyers", and praised a trial court ruling that would later be reversed on appeal (see above).

Some critics of New York's "Standing is Tiring (SIT) Act" have ridiculed the proposed law by comparing it to a scene from the Seinfeld episode The Maestro, where George Costanza provides a rocking chair for a security guard who must stand for the duration of his shift. The chair is so comfortable that the guard falls asleep and the store is robbed. New York State Assembly member Karines Reyes, a supporter of the bill, responded by saying that the jokes were "funny", but the law would be reasonably applied.

== Right to stand ==
In addition to the right to sit, the EEOC recognizes that workers have a right to "standing for those that require sitting as a potential reasonable accommodation under the ADA" and that the federal Pregnant Workers Fairness Act protects the right of pregnant workers to request "standing in jobs that require sitting" as a reasonable accommodation.

== See also ==
- High heel policy
- Muller v. Oregon
- Potty parity in the United States
- Protective laws
- Right to sit
