= Urinal =

Type of sanitary fixture for urination

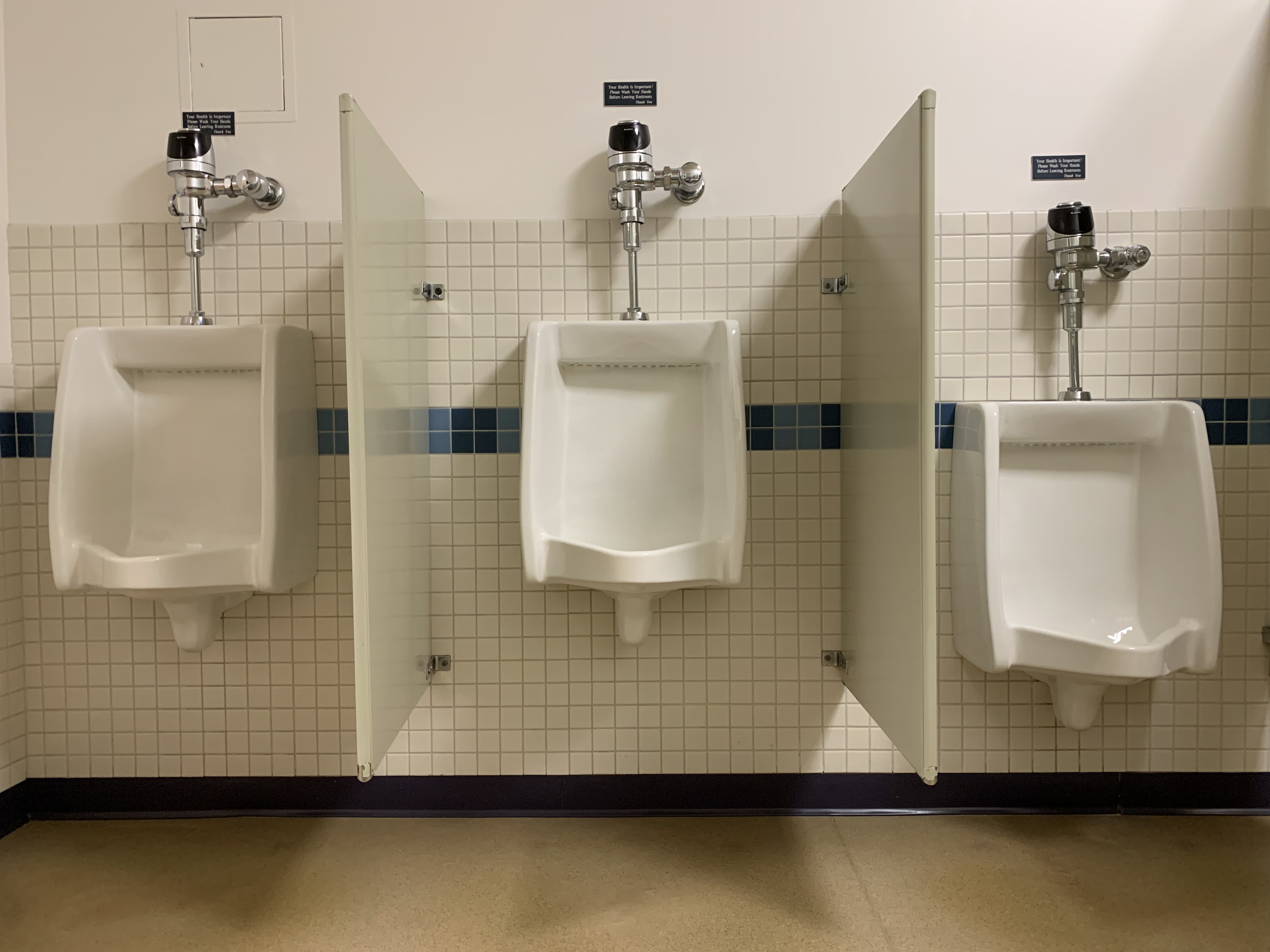
American Standard urinals in an office restroom

A urinal (US: /ˈjʊərənəl/, UK: /jʊəˈraɪnəl/) is a sanitary plumbing fixture similar to a toilet, but for urination only. Urinals are often provided in male public restrooms in Western countries (less so in Muslim countries where washing after urinating is more common). They are usually used in a standing position. Urinals can be equipped with manual flushing, automatic flushing, or without flushing, as is the case for waterless urinals. They can be arranged as single sanitary fixtures (with or without privacy walls), or in a trough design without privacy walls.

Urinals designed for women ("female urinals") also exist, but are rare. It is possible for women to use stand-up urinals using a female urination device. The term "urinal" may also apply to a small building or other structure containing such fixtures. It can also refer to a small container in which urine can be collected for medical analysis, or for use where access to toilet facilities is not possible, such as in small aircraft, during extended stakeouts, or for the bedridden.

== Description ==
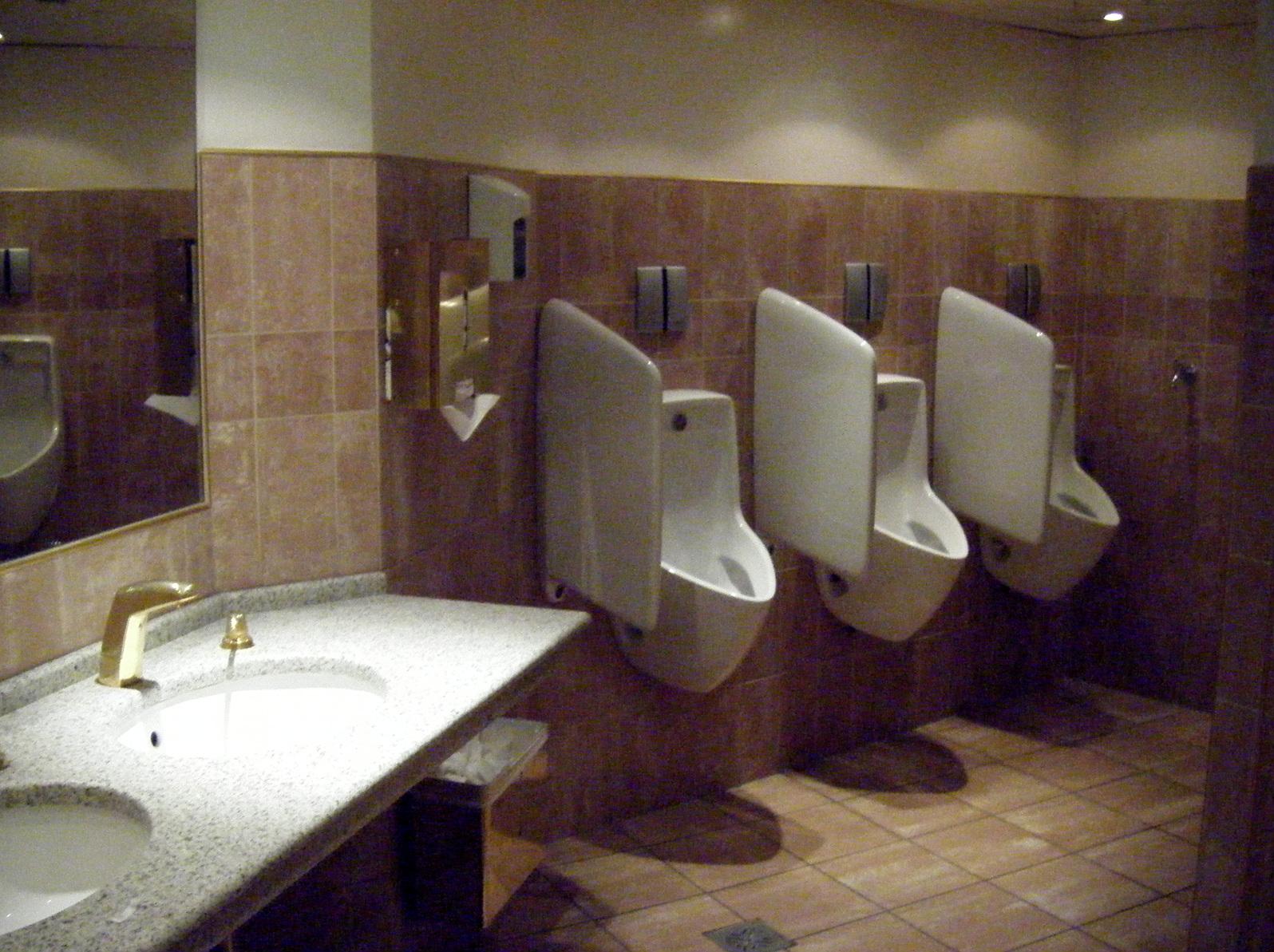
Urinals with privacy barriers in a men's public toilet in Vienna, Austria

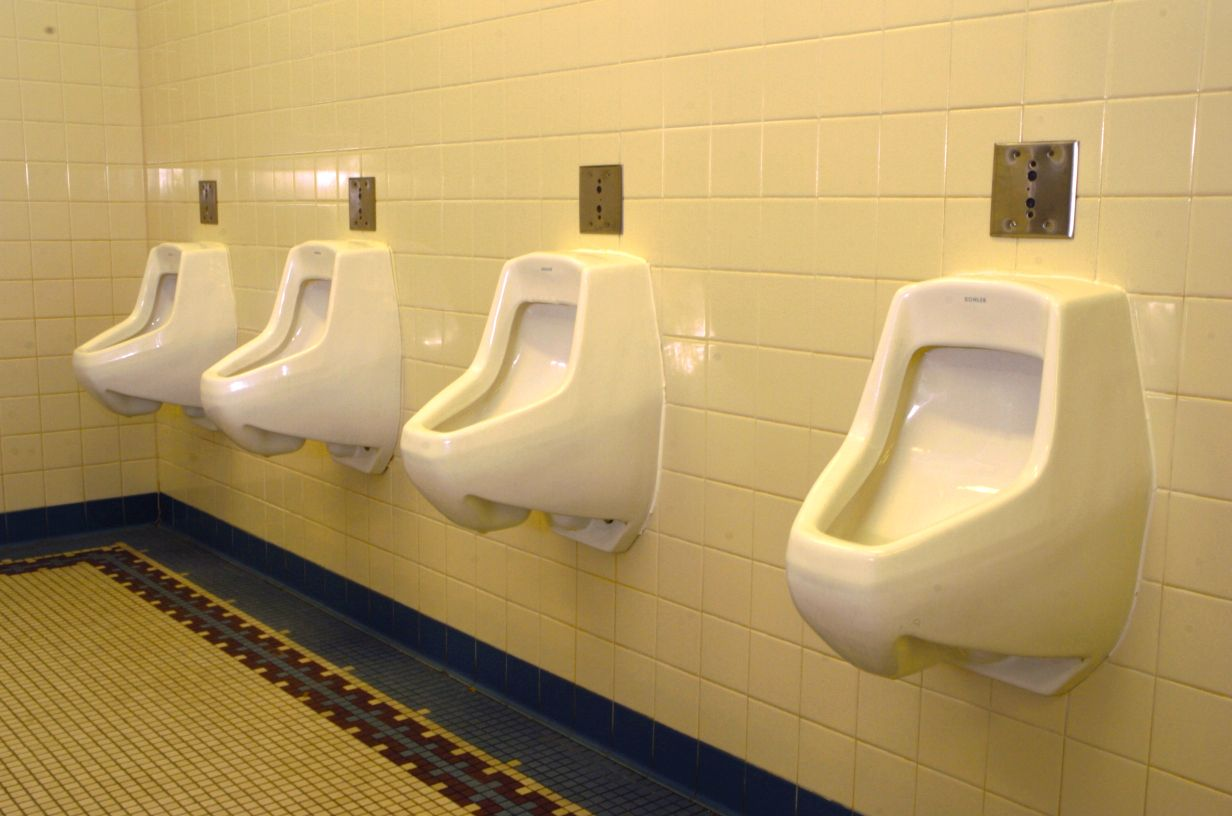
Typical arrangement of sensor-operated urinals in a row without partitions

A stand-up urinal can be used conveniently and appropriately by someone who has a penis or other adaptive means with which to urinate from a standing position. There is no age restriction, and urinals are commonly used by men and boys of all ages. Female urinals also exist but are not common.

In busy public toilets, urinals are installed for efficiency. Compared with urination in a general-purpose toilet, usage is faster and more sanitary because at the urinal there are no fecal germs, no additional doors or locks to touch, and no seat to turn up. Consistent use of urinals also keeps the toilet stalls cleaner and more available for persons who need to defecate. A urinal takes less space, is simpler, and consumes less water per flush (or even no water at all) than a flush toilet. Large numbers of them are usually installed along a common supply pipe and drain. Urinals may also come in different heights, to accommodate tall and short users.

Public urinals usually have a plastic mesh guard, which may optionally contain a deodorizing urinal deodorizer block or "urinal cake". The mesh is intended to prevent solid objects (such as cigarette butts, feces, chewing gum, or paper) from being flushed and possibly causing a plumbing stoppage. In some restaurants, bars, and clubs, ice may be put in the urinals, serving some of the same purposes as the deodorizing block without dispensing odorous chemicals.

=== Arrangement ===
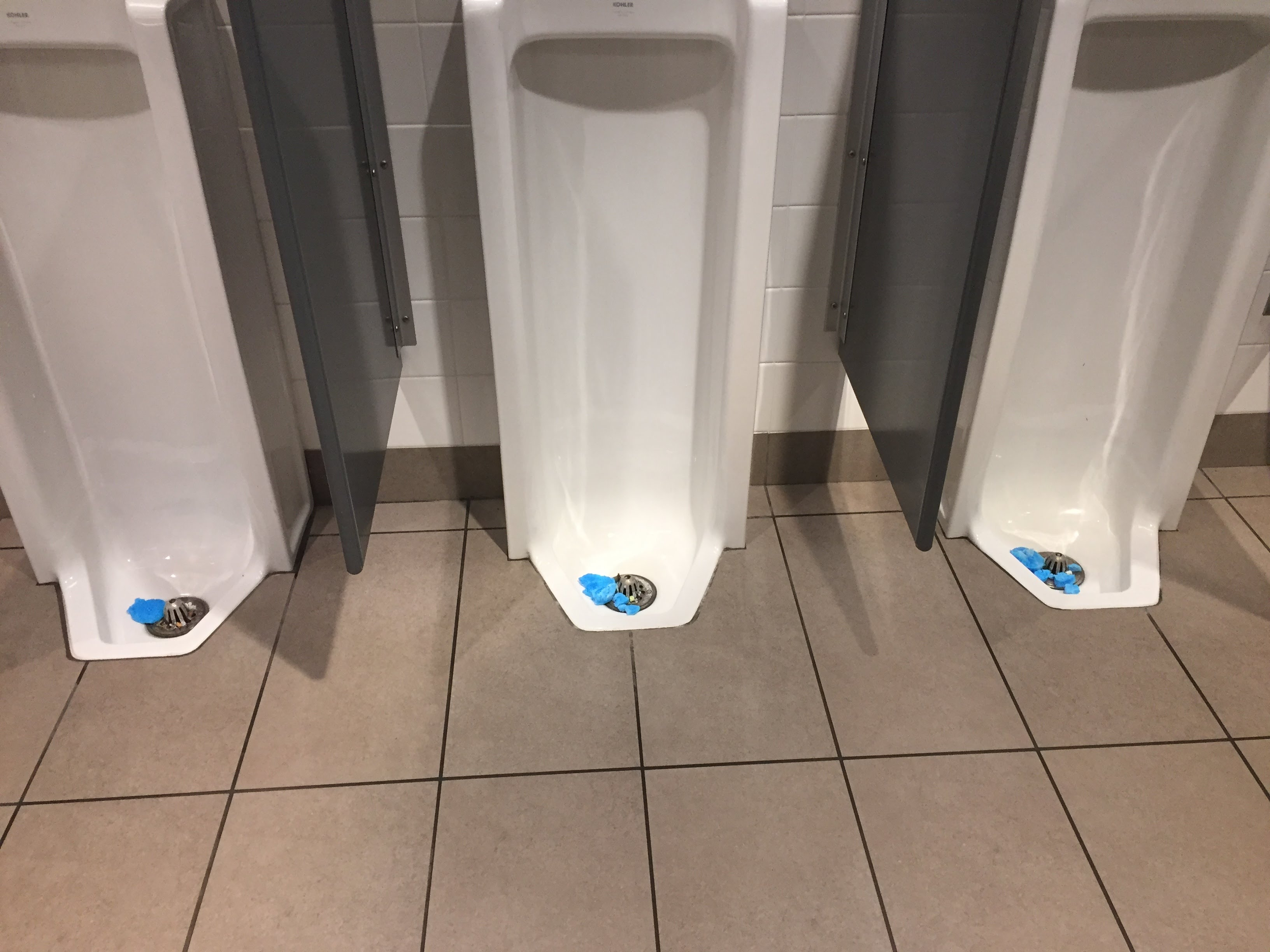
Urinals that extend to the floor, suitable for users of all heights

For purposes of space and economic practicality, urinals are not typically placed inside stalls. Unlike in female public toilets that do not have urinals, optimal resource efficiency in male restrooms therefore requires urinating in full visibility of other users. In recent years, it has become more common in some countries for dividers or partitions to be installed between urinals to eliminate any chance of incidental exposure during the process of urination.

Urinals in high-capacity public toilets are usually arranged in one or more rows directly opposite the door, so that users have their backs to people entering or standing outside. Often, one or two of the urinals, typically at one end of a long row, will be mounted lower than the others; they are meant for the disabled and other users who cannot reach the regular urinals. In facilities where people of various heights are present, such as schools, urinals that extend down to floor level may be used to allow anyone of any height to use any urinal.

Instead of individual fixtures, trough urinals may be installed. These designs can be used by a number of men simultaneously, but they do not allow for much privacy. They are often installed where there is a high peak demand, such as in schools, music festivals, theatrical events, sports stadiums, discos, dance clubs, and convention halls.

Urinals were once installed exclusively in commercial or institutional settings, but are also now available for private homes. They offer the advantages of substantial water savings in residences with many occupants, and reduction of "splash back", making cleaning easier.

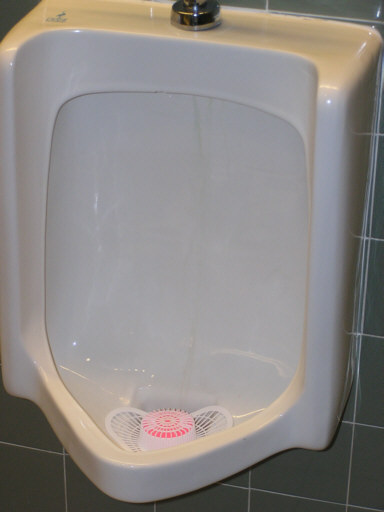
Urinal with pink-colored urinal cake

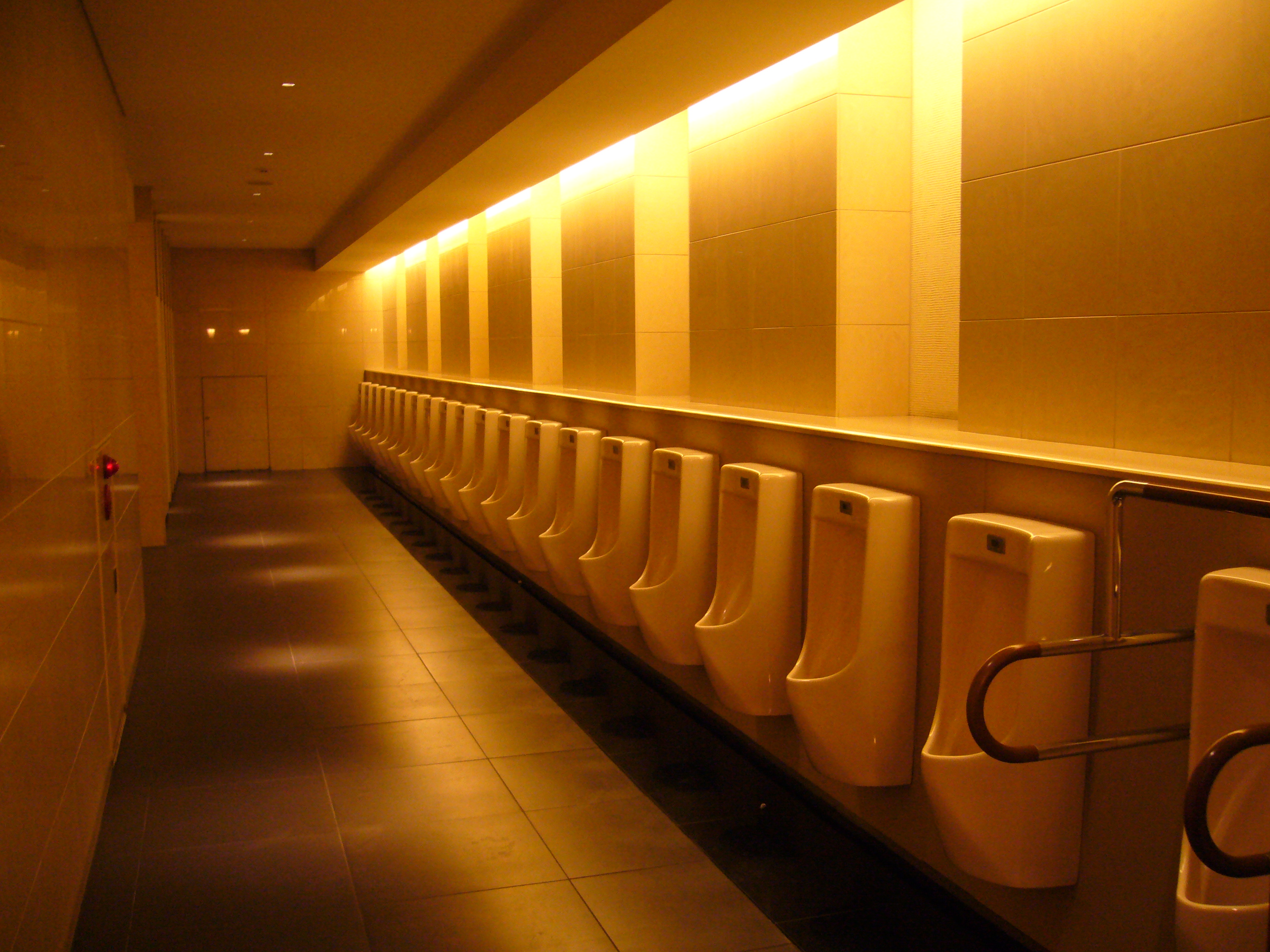
Urinals in Tokyo, Japan; one at far right is fitted with handle bars for people with disabilities

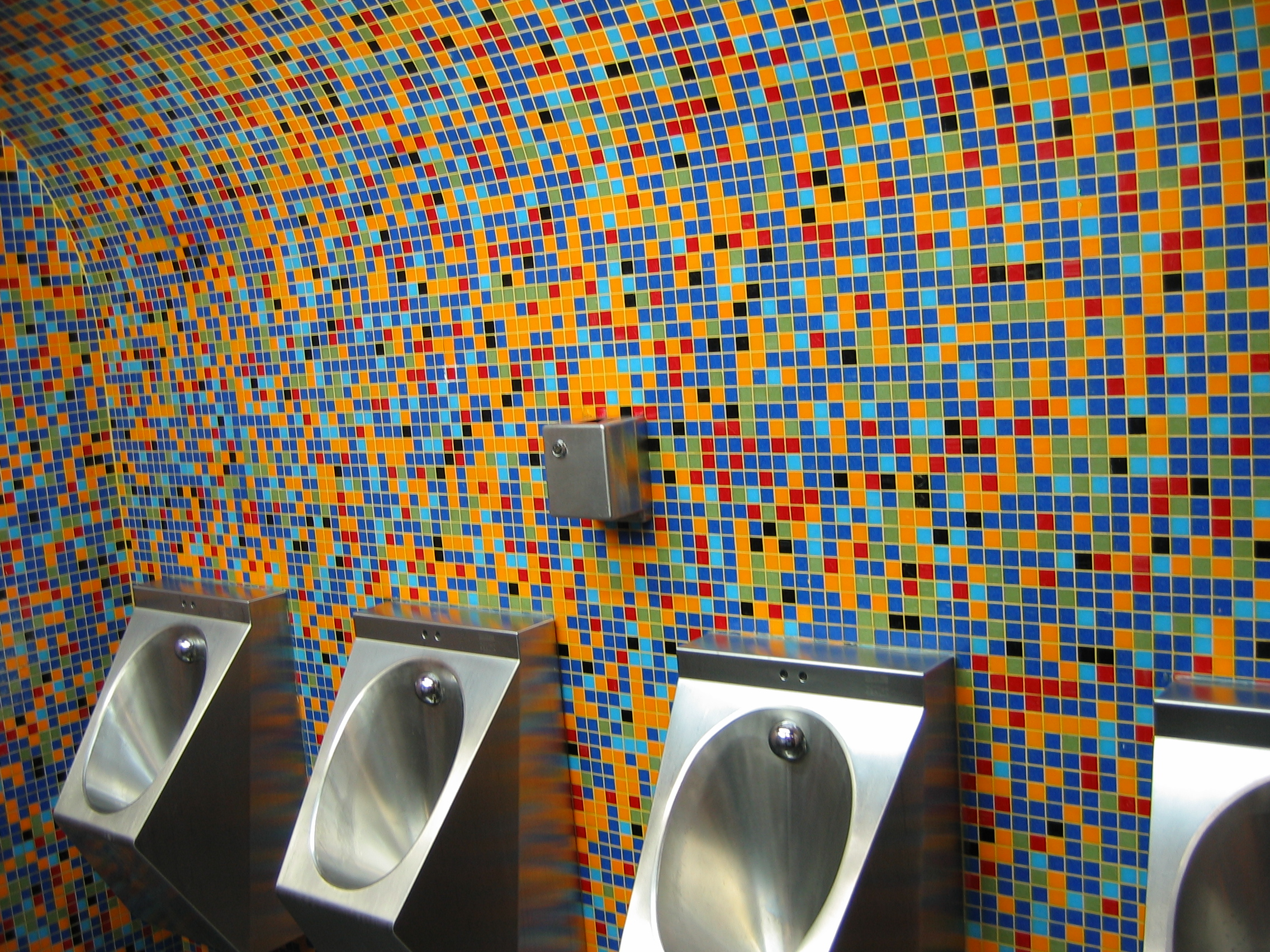
Urinals in the Czech Republic

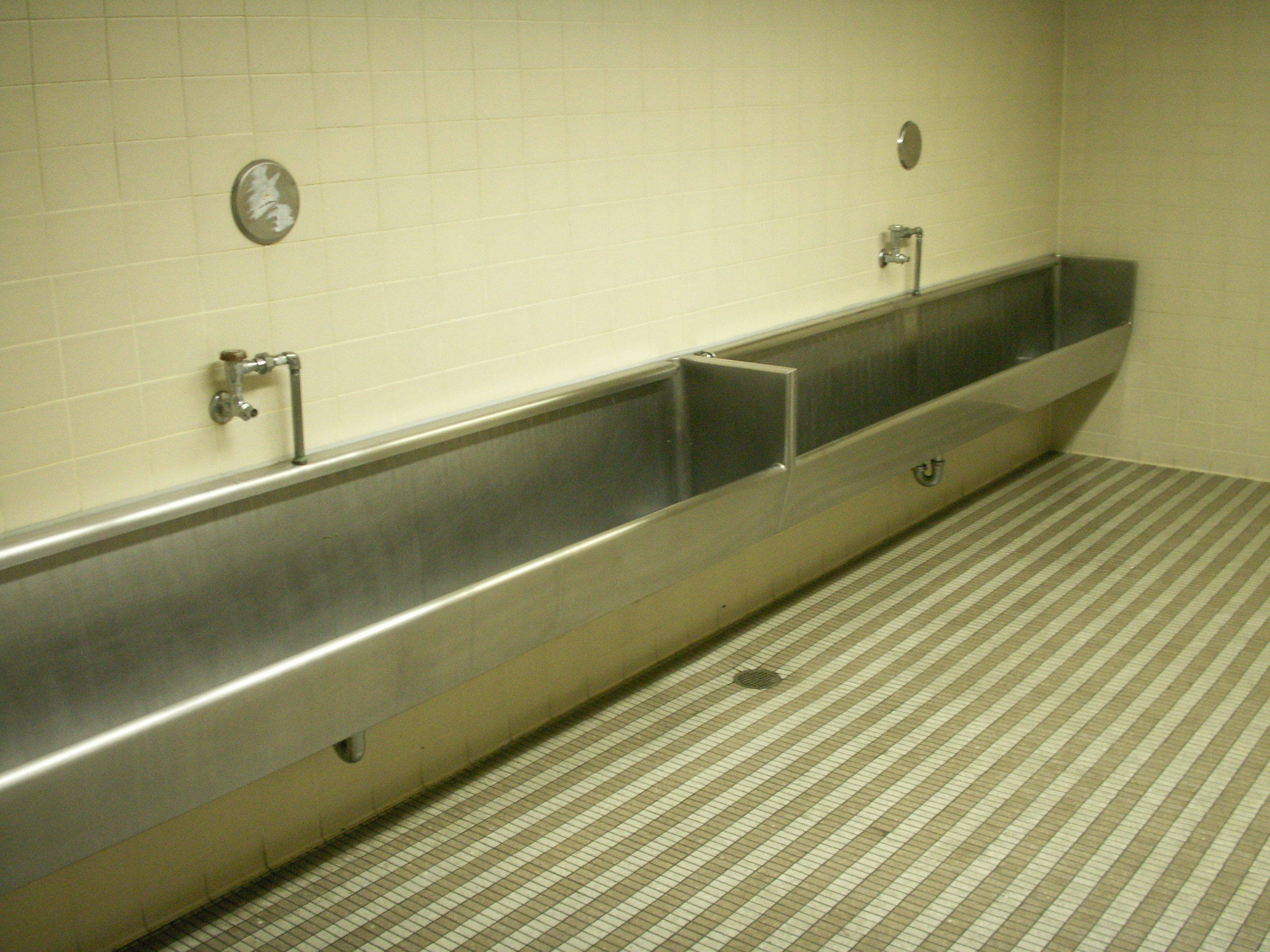
Trough urinal in Los Angeles

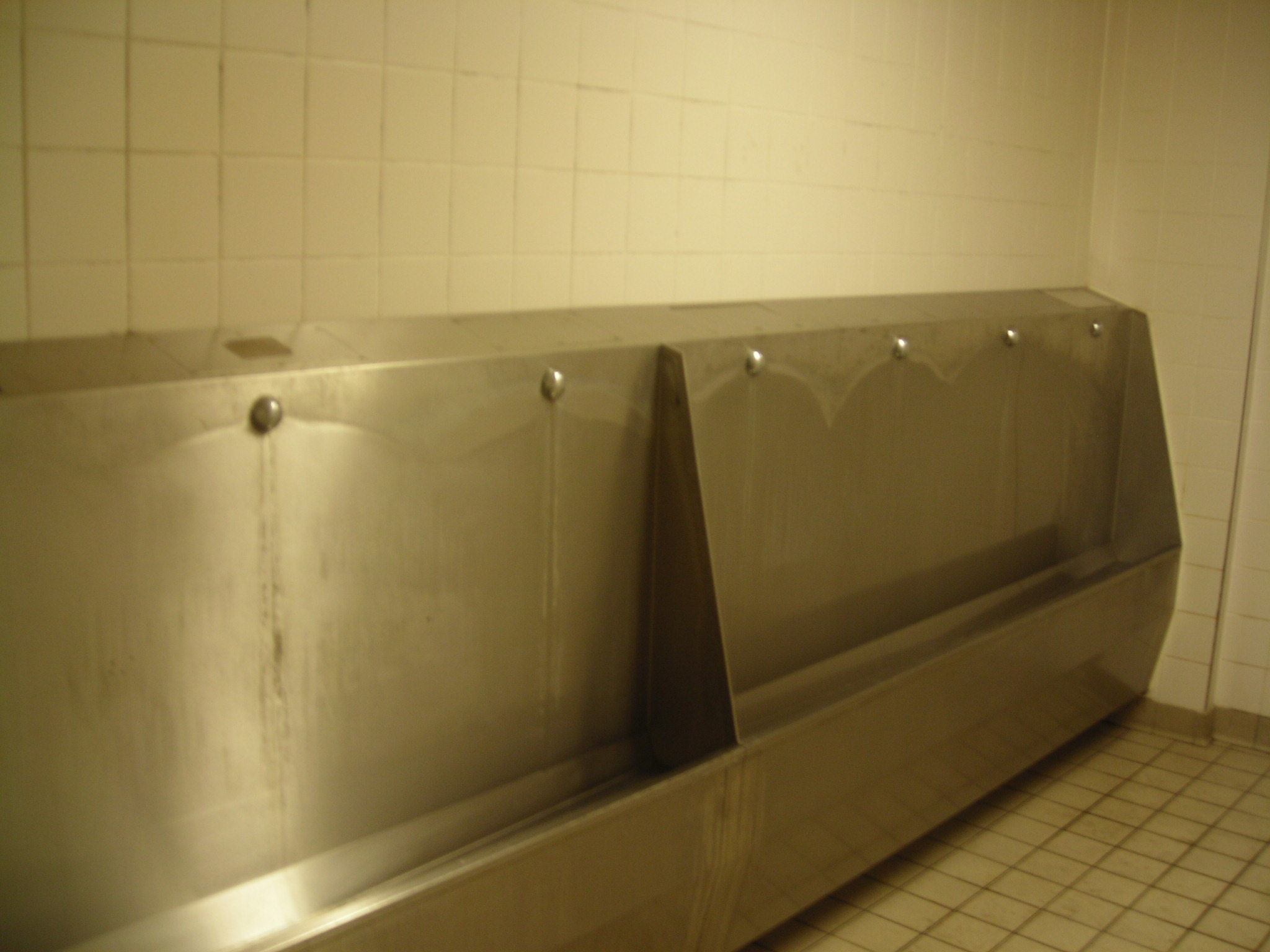
Train station urinal in Munich, Germany

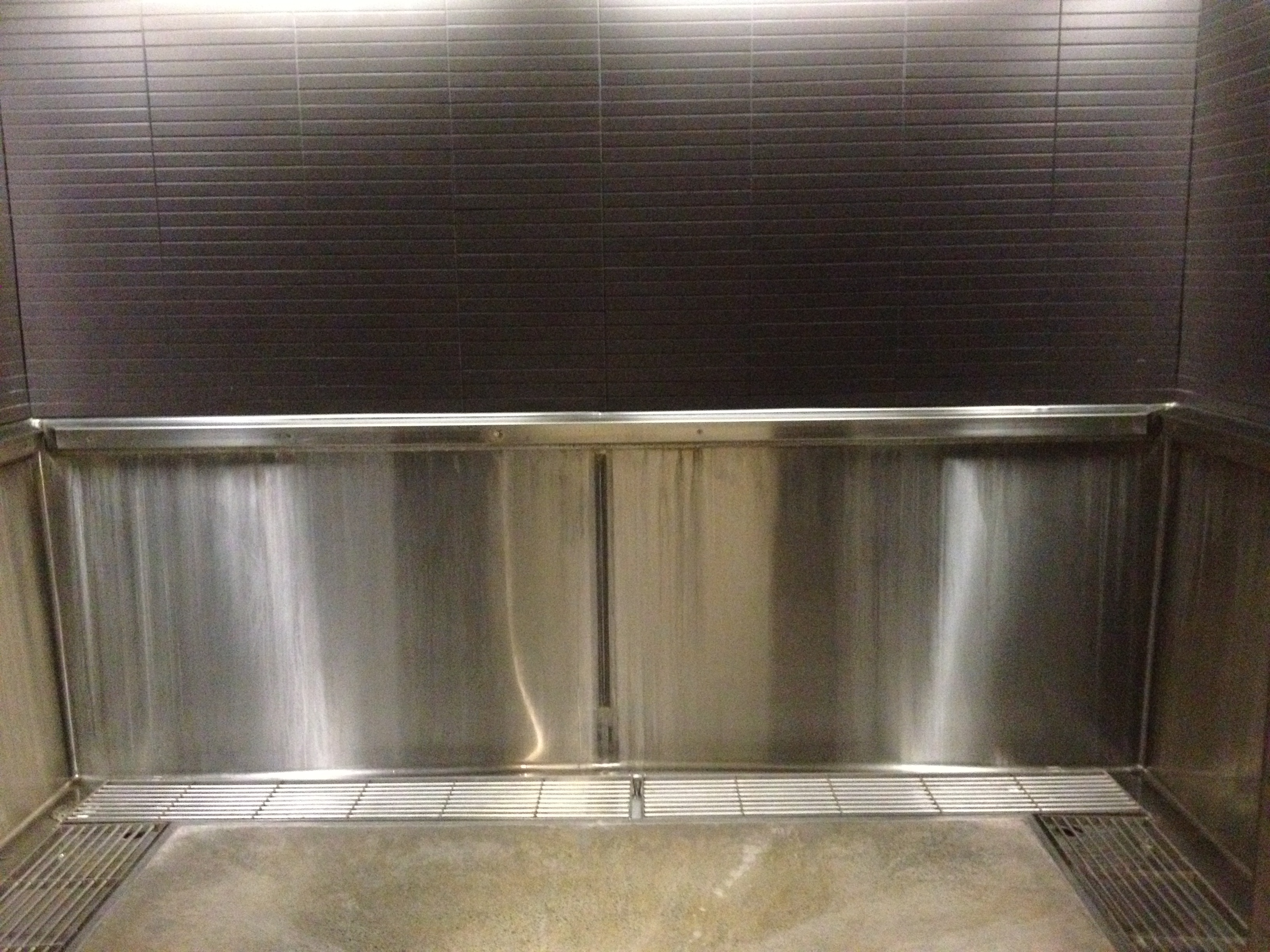
Modern trough urinal in an art museum in Brisbane, Australia

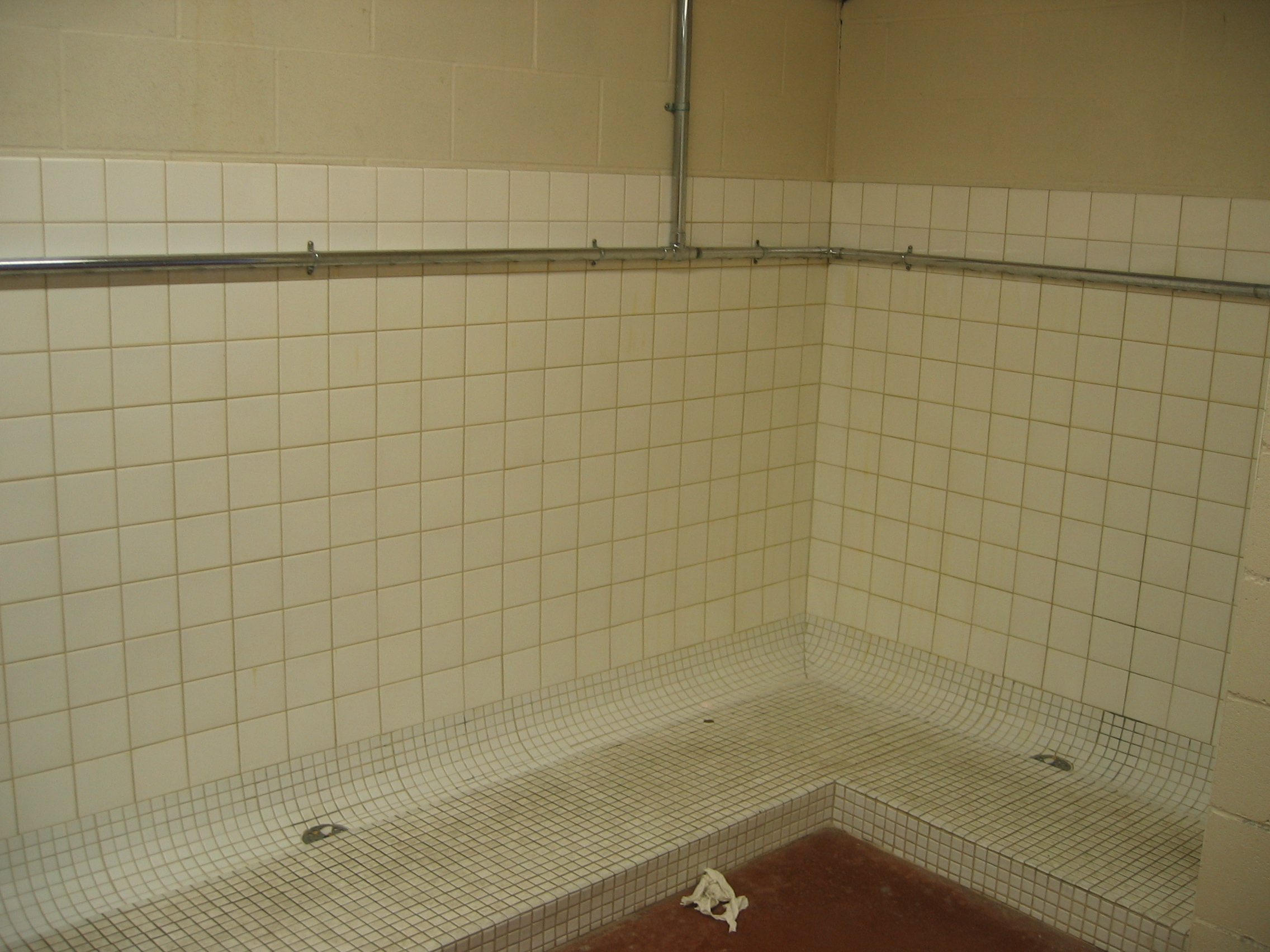
Old-style wall urinal at Stetson Bowl Stadium in Surrey, British Columbia, Canada

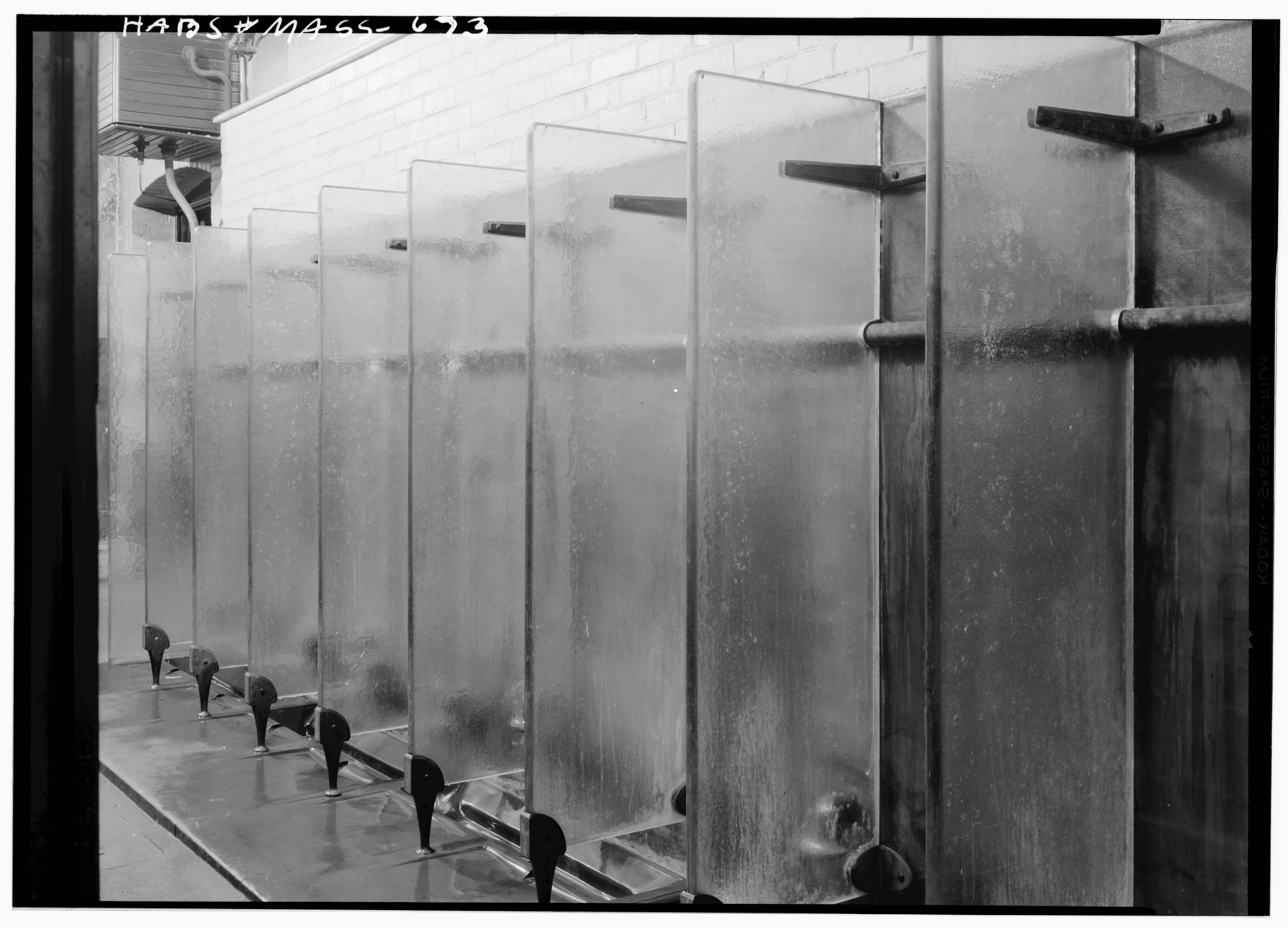
Vintage urinals in Boston secondary school (c. 1933–1959)

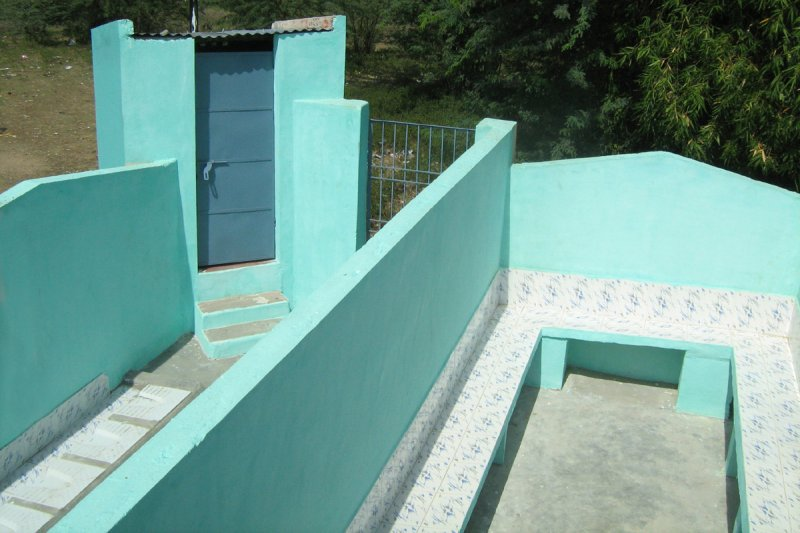
Outdoor urinals at school for boys (right) and girls (left) in Tamil Nadu, India

== Urinals with flushing ==
Most public urinals incorporate a water flushing system to rinse urine from the bowl of the device, to prevent foul odors. The flush can be triggered by one of several methods:

=== Manual handles ===
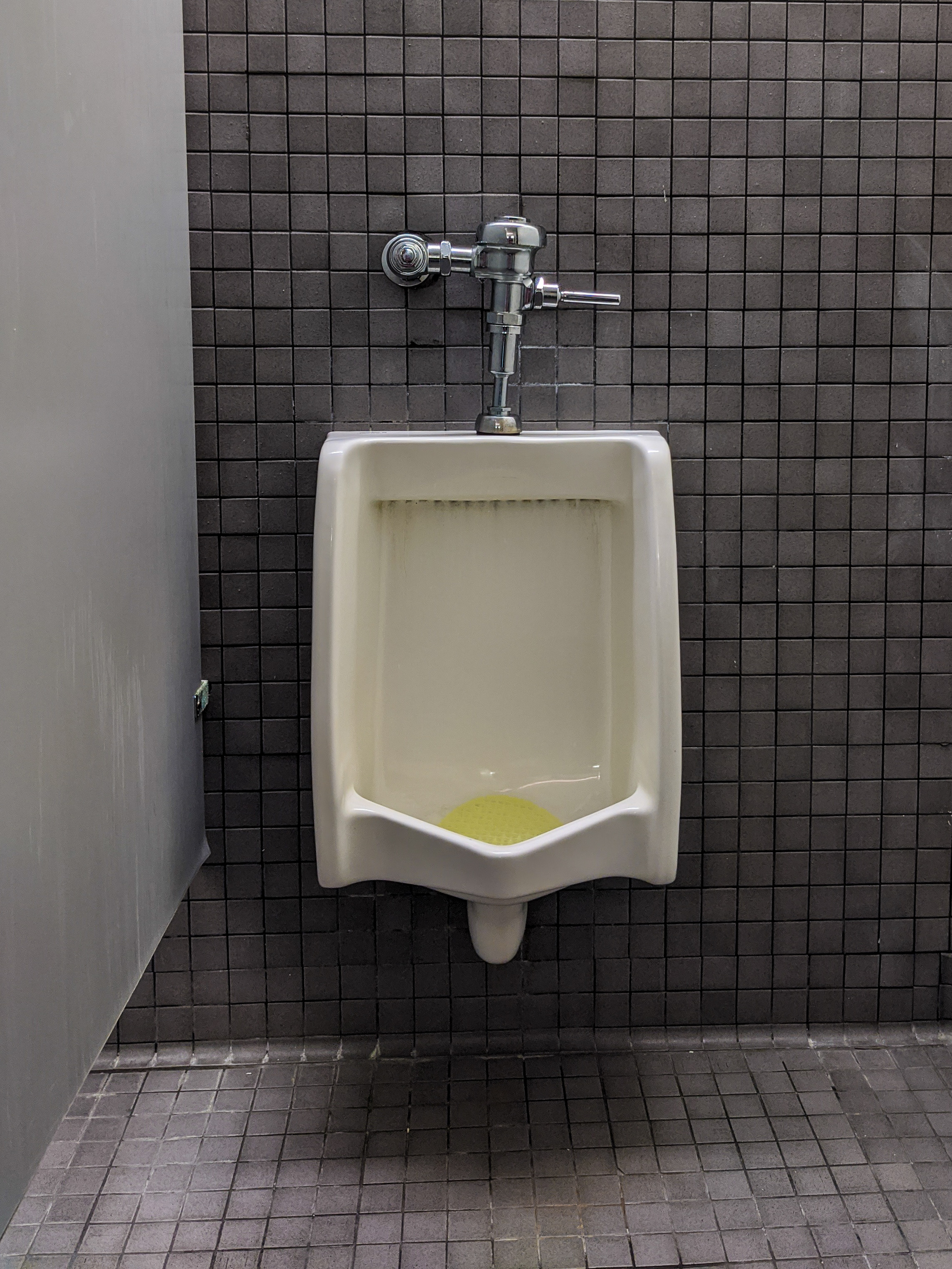
Urinal flushing handle

This type of flush might be regarded as the standard type of flush in North America. Each urinal is equipped with a short lever to activate the flush, with users expected to pull it down as they leave. Such a directly controlled system is the most efficient, provided that patrons remember to use it. This is far from certain, however, often because of fear of touching the handle, which is located too high to kick. Urinals with foot-activated flushing systems are sometimes found in high-traffic areas; these systems have a button set into the floor or a pedal on the wall at ankle height. The Americans with Disabilities Act requires that flush valves be mounted no higher than 44 inches (110 cm) AFF (above the finished floor). Additionally, the urinal is to be mounted no higher than 17 inches (43 cm) AFF, and to have a rim that is tapered and elongated and protrudes at least 14 inches (36 cm) from the wall. This enables users in wheelchairs to straddle the lip of the urinal and urinate without having to "arc" the flow of urine upwards.

=== Timed flush ===
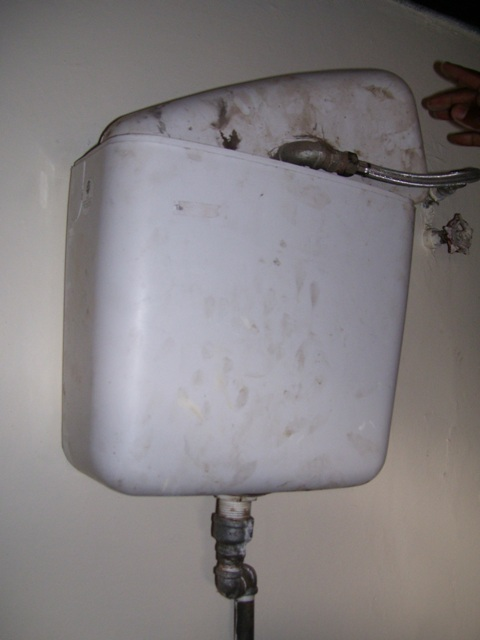
Urinal cistern

In Europe and South America, manual flush handles are unusual. Instead, the traditional system is a timed flush that operates automatically at regular intervals. A group of urinals will be connected to a single overhead cistern, which contains the timing mechanism. A constant drip-feed of water slowly fills the cistern until a tipping point is reached, when the valve opens (or a siphon begins to drain the cistern), and all the urinals in the group are flushed. Electronic controllers performing the same function are also used.

This system does not require any action from its users, but it is wasteful of water when toilets are used irregularly. However, in these countries users are so used to the automatic system, that attempts to install manual flushes to save water are generally unsuccessful. Users ignore them not through deliberate laziness or fear of infection, but because activating the flush is not habitual.

To help reduce water usage when the urinals are not being used, some urinals with timed flushing use a water-saving device. The cistern will be connected with a passive infrared sensor, which makes the cistern stop filling unless the urinals are being used. The sensor can be wall or ceiling-mounted, and will detect movement within the range of the urinals.

=== Door-regulated flush ===
Used mostly in the countries of Asia. This is an older method of water-saving automatic flushing, which only operates when the public toilet has been used. A push-button switch is mounted in the door frame, and triggers the flush valve for all urinals every time the door is opened. While it cannot detect the use of individual urinals, it provides reasonable flushing action without wasting excessive amounts of water when the urinals are not being used. This method requires a spring-operated automatic door closer, since the flush mechanism only operates when the door opens.

Alternatively, a flushing system connected to the door can count the number of users, and operate when the number of door opening events reaches a certain value. At night, the door never opens, so flushing never occurs.

=== Automatic flush ===
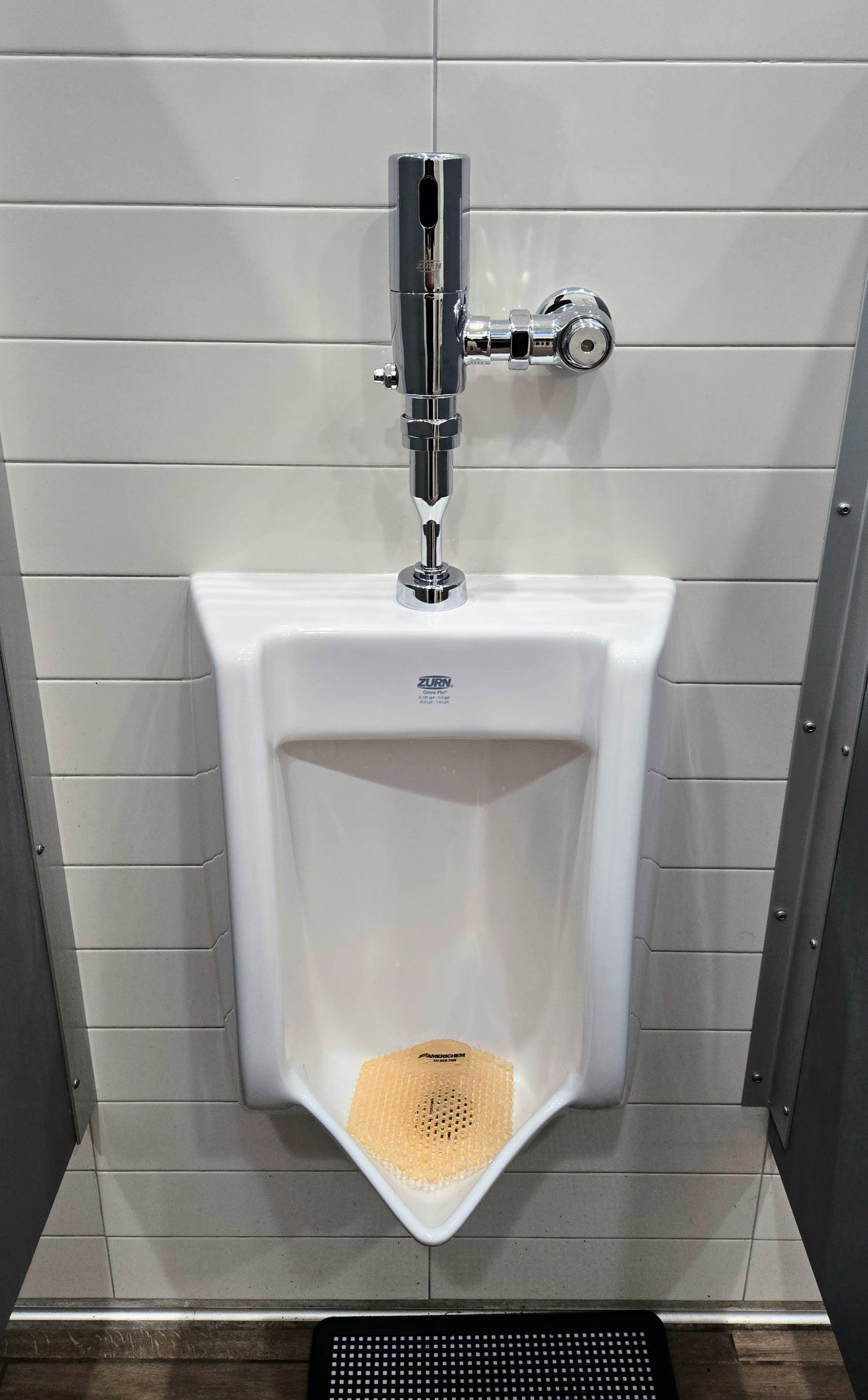
Urinal with automatic flush valve

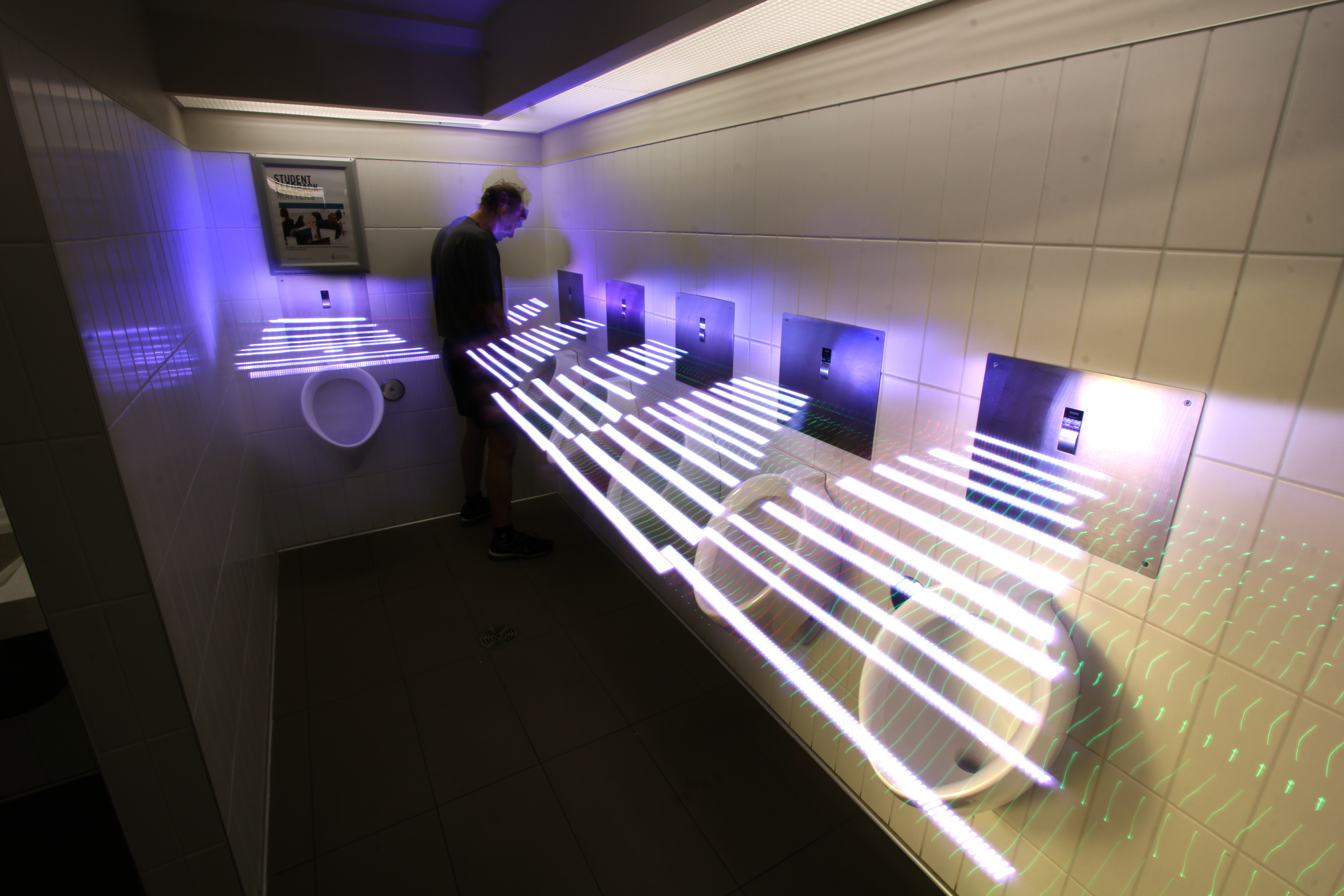
Long-exposure photography shows the sensors' detecting range

Automatic flush valves solve the problems of previous approaches, and are common in new installations all around the world. A passive infrared sensor identifies when the urinal has been used, by detecting when someone has stood in front of it and moved away, and then activates the flush. There usually is also a small override button, to allow optional manual flushing when the sensor is not working.

Automatic flush facilities can be retrofitted to existing systems. The handle-operated valves of a manual system can be replaced with a suitably designed self-contained electronic valve, often battery-powered to avoid the need to add cables. Older timed-flush installations may add a device that regulates the water flow to the cistern according to the overall activity detected in the room. This does not provide true per-fixture automatic flushing, but is simple and cheap to add because only one device is required for the whole system.

To prevent false-triggering of the automatic flush, most infrared detectors require that a presence be detected for at least ten seconds, such as when a person is standing in front of it. This prevents a whole line of automatic flush units from triggering in succession if someone just walks past them. The automatic flush mechanism also typically waits for the presence to go out of sensor range before flushing. This reduces water usage, compared to a sensor that would trigger a continuous flushing action the whole time that a presence is detected.

== Waterless urinals ==
Since about the 1990s, urinals have been available on the market that use no water at all. These are called waterless urinals or flushless urinals.

The first waterless urinal was developed at the end of the 19th century by the German-Austrian Wilhelm Beetz using an oil-based syphon with a liquid that he called Urinol.

Waterless urinals can save between 15,000 and 45,000 US gallons (57,000 and 170,000 L) of water per urinal per year, depending on the amount of water used in the water-flushed urinal for comparison purposes, and the number of uses per day. For example, these numbers assume that the urinal would be used between 40 and 120 times per business day.

Waterless urinals allow the collection of undiluted pure urine which can be used as a fertilizer.

=== Odor control ===
Models of waterless urinals introduced by the Waterless Company in 1991 and others in 2001 by Falcon Waterfree Technologies and Sloan Valve Company, as well as Duravit, use a trap insert filled with a sealant liquid instead of water. The lighter-than-water sealant floats on top of the urine collected in the U-bend, preventing odors from being released into the air. The cartridge and sealant must be periodically replaced.

Waterless urinals may also use an outlet system that traps the odor, preventing the smell often present in toilet blocks. Another method to eliminate odor was introduced by Caroma, which installed a deodorizing block in their waterless urinal that was activated during use.

Odor control in waterless urinals is also achieved with simple one-way valves which are manufactured as a flat rubber tube (the tube opens when urine flows through) or with two silicone "curtain" pieces. The former is used in the waterless urinals by the company Keramag in Germany (model Centaurus) and the latter is marketed by the company Addicom in South Africa who called it the EcoSmellStop device.

=== Applications ===
Waterless urinals can be installed in high-traffic facilities, and in situations where providing a water supply may be difficult or where water conservation is desired.

Waterless urinals have become rather common in Germany since about 2009 and can be found at restaurants, cinemas, highway rest stops, train stations and so forth. It was estimated in 2009 that there are about 6 million urinals in Germany, and about 100,000 of those were of the waterless type in that year.

Due to high-level water restrictions during about 2005–2008 the city council of Brisbane, Australia mandated conversion to waterless urinals. Flush urinals are nowadays rarely seen in Brisbane.

=== Installation and maintenance ===
The drain pipes from waterless urinals need to be installed correctly in terms of diameter, slope and pipe materials in order to prevent buildup of struvite ("urine stone") and calcium phosphate precipitates in the pipes, which would cause blockages and could require expensive repairs. Also, the undiluted urine is corrosive to metals (except for stainless steel), which is why plastic pipes are generally preferred for urine drain pipes.

Most waterless urinals do not prevent odorous staining on the surface of the urinals, and periodic cleaning of the fixture and its surrounds is still required. When maintained according to manufacturers' recommendations, well-designed waterless urinals do not emit any more odors than flushed urinals do. However, some odor-trapping devices work better than others in the longer term. Regular, thorough maintenance of the respective odor control device is needed for all types of waterless urinals, as per the manufacturer's recommendation.

=== Situation in the United States ===
US federal law has mandated no more than one gallon per flush since 1994, and the EPA estimates that the average urinal is flushed 20 times per day, which gives an average water use of 7,300 US gallons (28,000 L) per year. Mechanical traps are not allowed by US building codes but are allowed in many other countries.

Plumbers' unions initially opposed waterless urinals, citing concerns about health and safety, which have been debunked by scientists who have studied the devices. Facing opposition to their attempts to have the devices allowed in plumbing codes, manufacturers devised a compromise. The Uniform Plumbing Code was modified to allow waterless urinals to be installed, provided that unneeded water lines were nevertheless run to the back of the urinals. This allows conventional water-flushing urinals to be retrofitted later, if waterless models were judged to be unsatisfactory over time.

In March 2006, the Associated Press reported that the plumbers' union in Philadelphia had become upset because developer Liberty Property Trust had decided to use waterless urinals in the Comcast Center. Many in the union believed that this would lead to less work for them. The developer cited saving the city 1,600,000 US gallons (6,100,000 L) of water per year as its deciding factor.

In February 2010, the headquarters of the California EPA removed waterless urinals that were installed in 2003 due to "hundreds of complaints", including odors and splashed urine on the floors. Officials blamed the failure of the project on incompatibility with the building's existing plumbing systems.

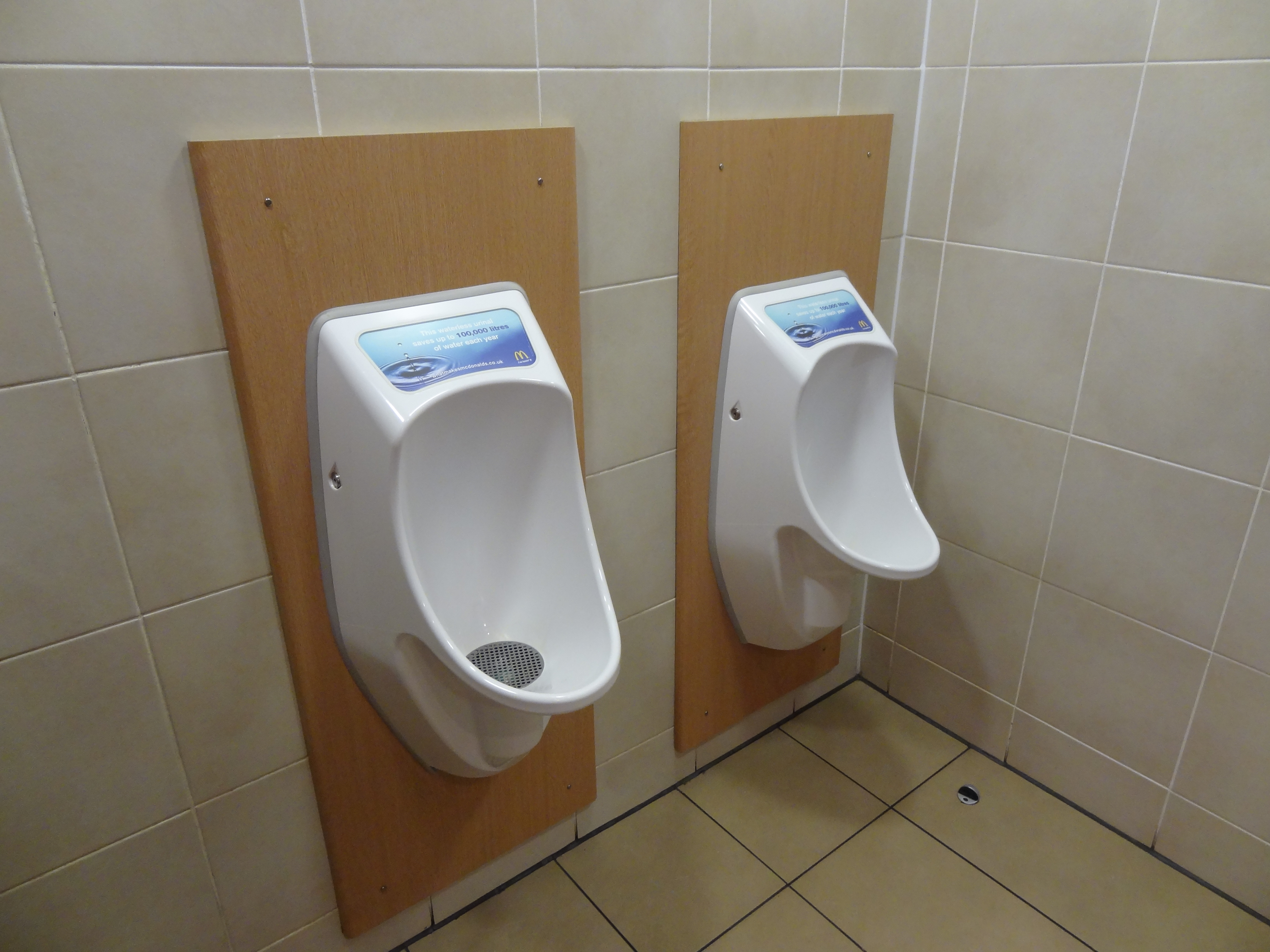
Waterless urinals used in British McDonald's restaurants

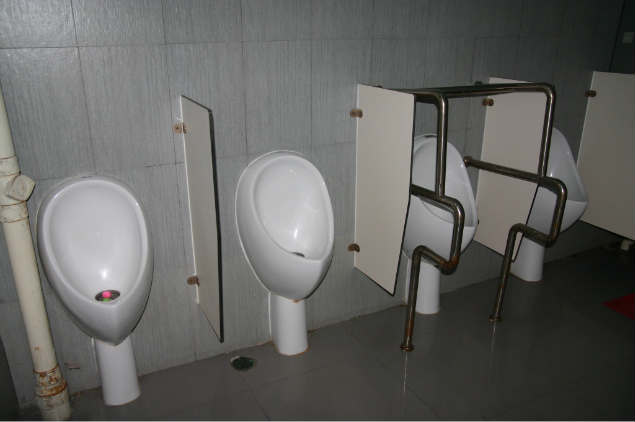
Waterless urinal (waterless urinal at right is for people with disabilities)

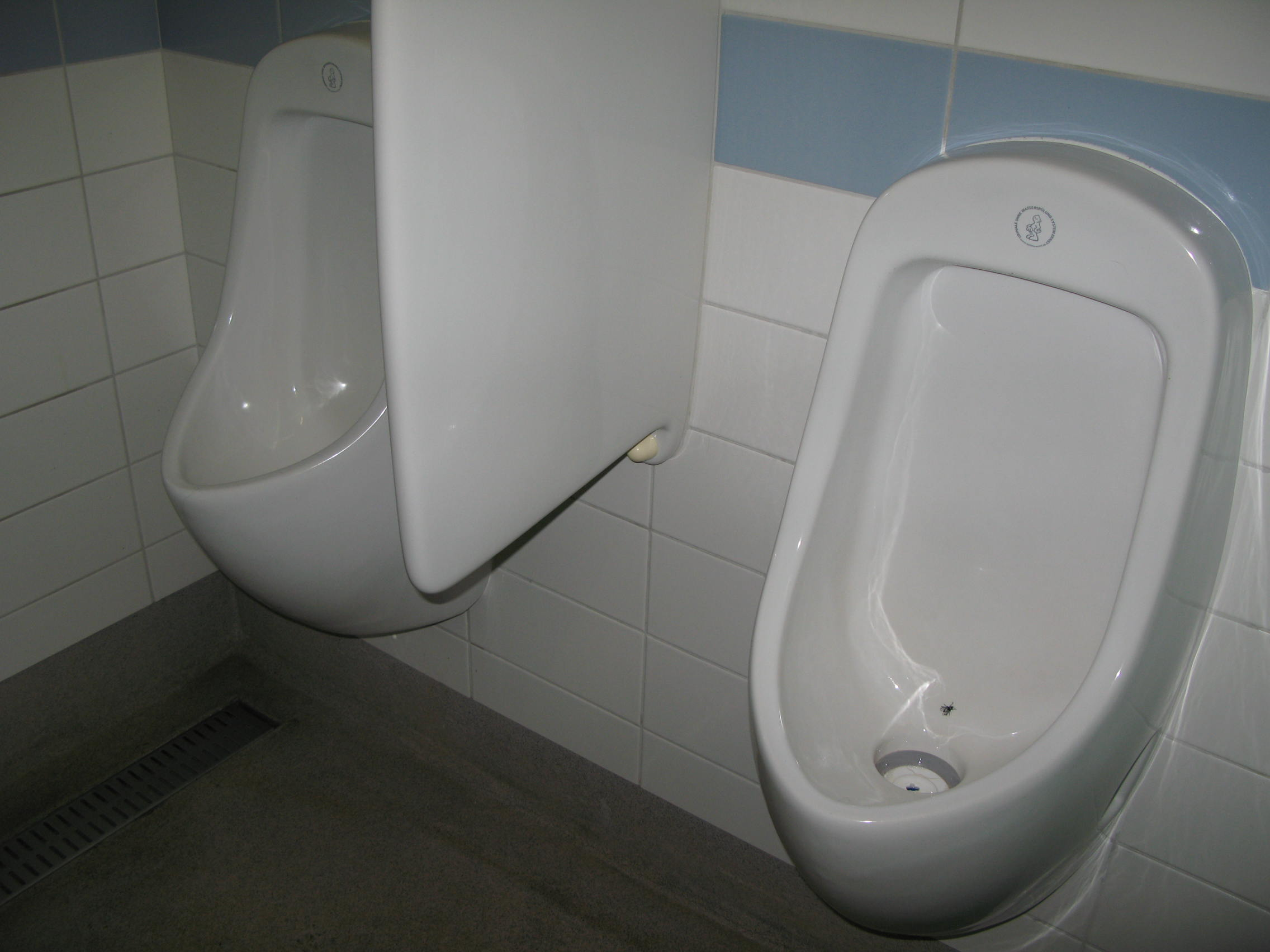
Waterless urinals in Switzerland

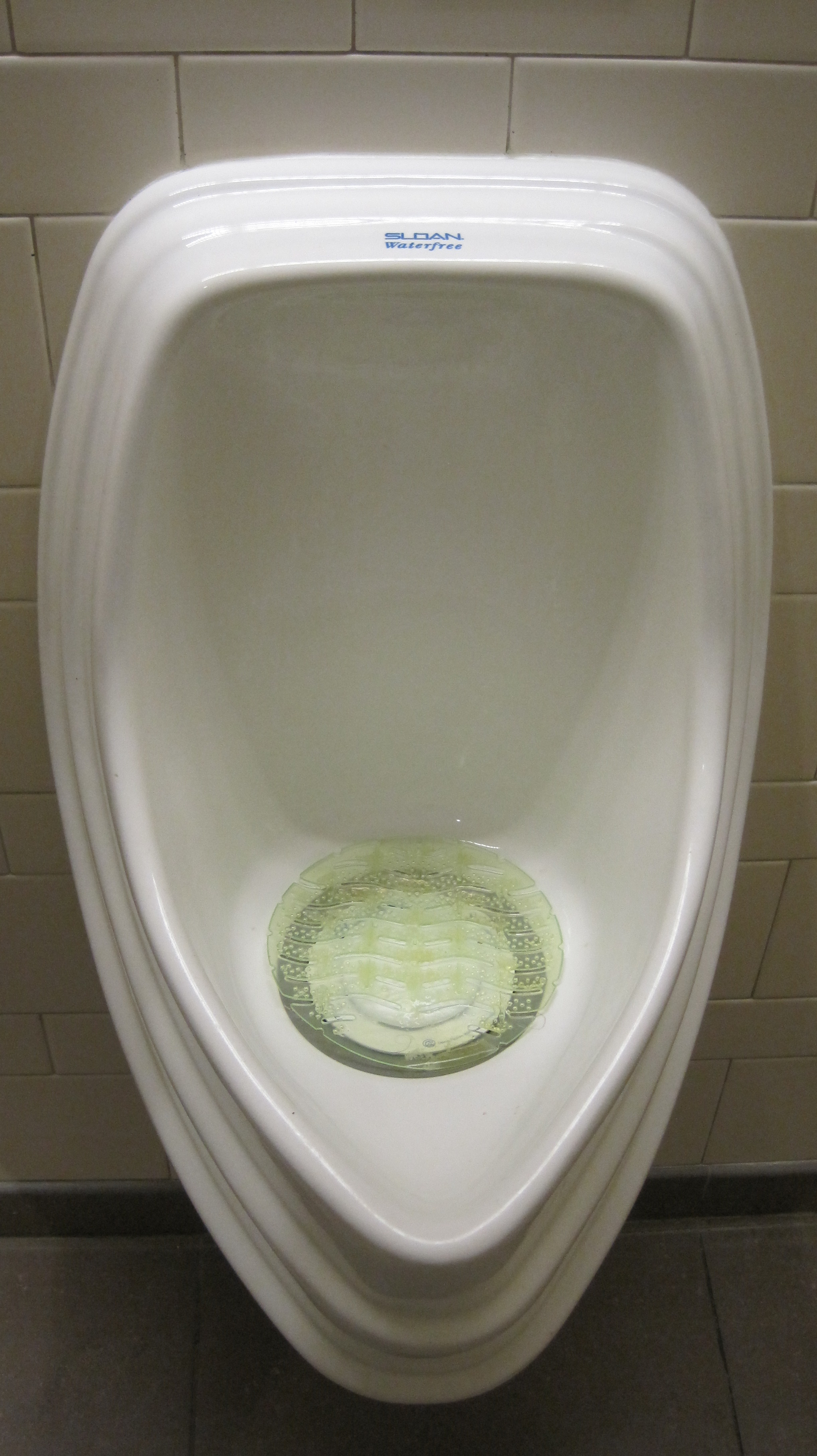
Waterless urinal in California

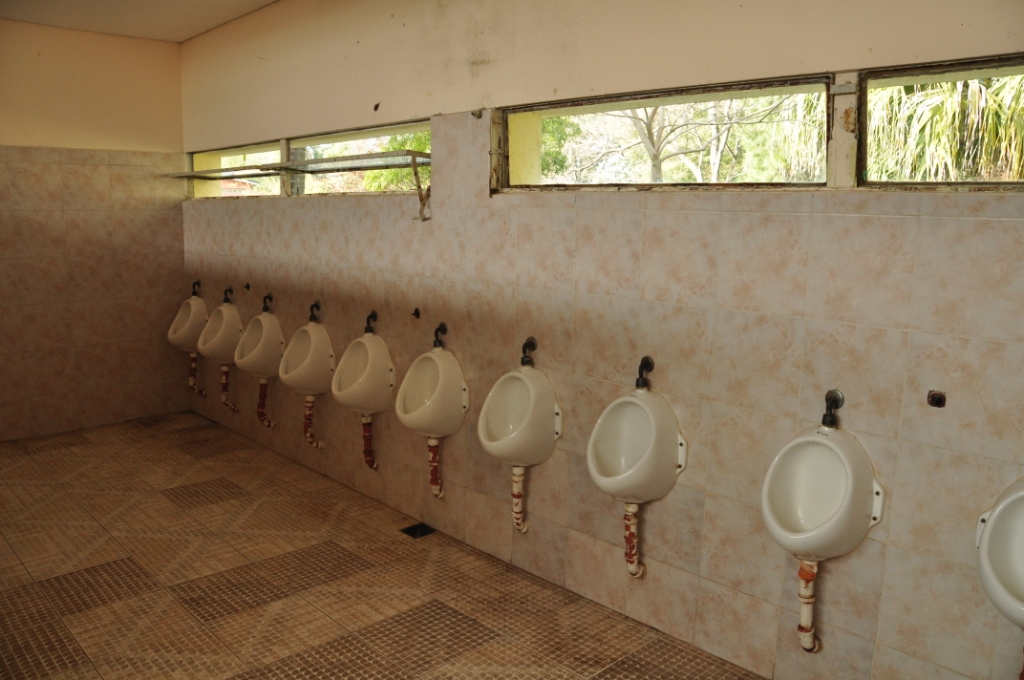
Waterless boys' urinals in Argentina

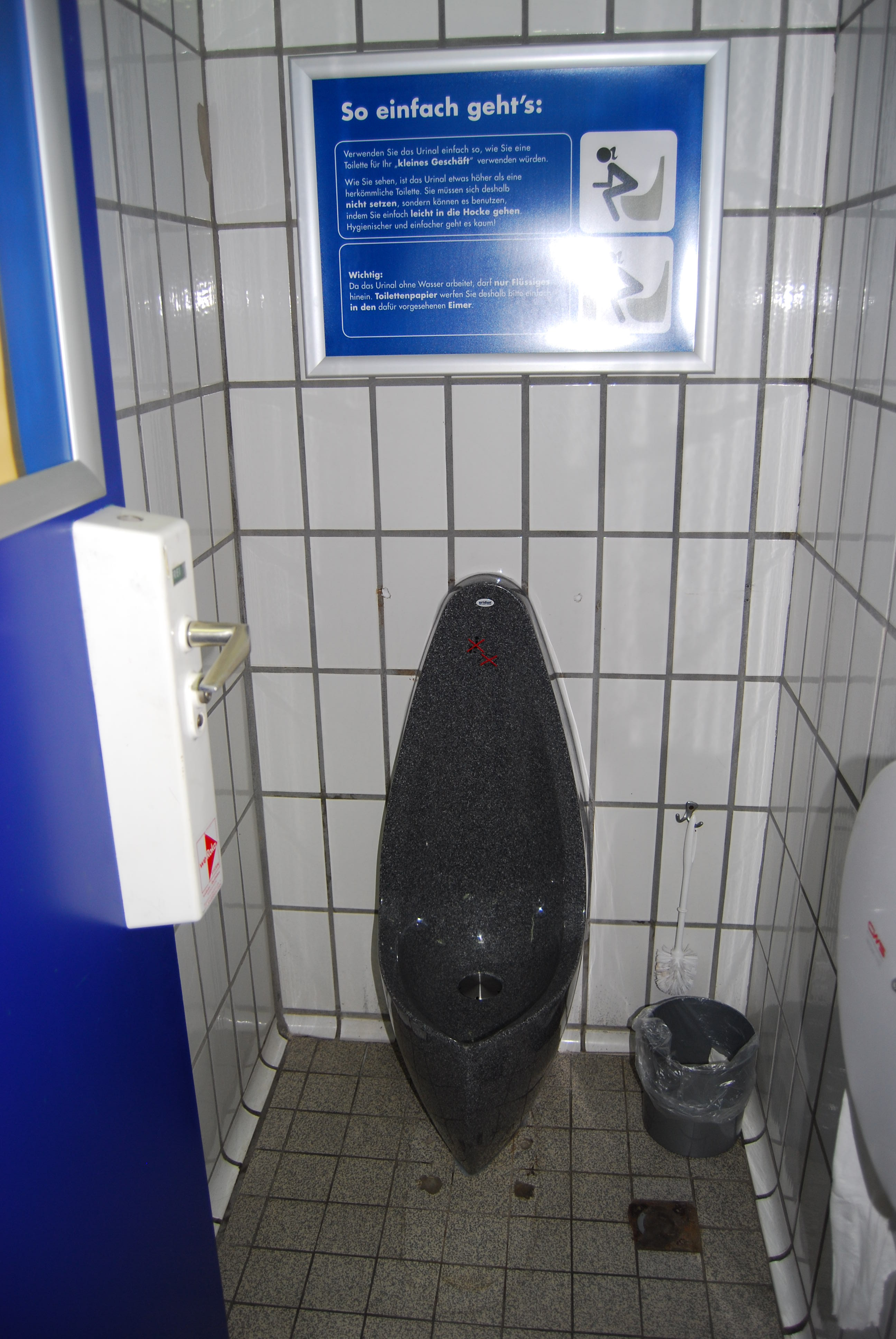
Waterless urinal for women at a station in Frankfurt, Germany

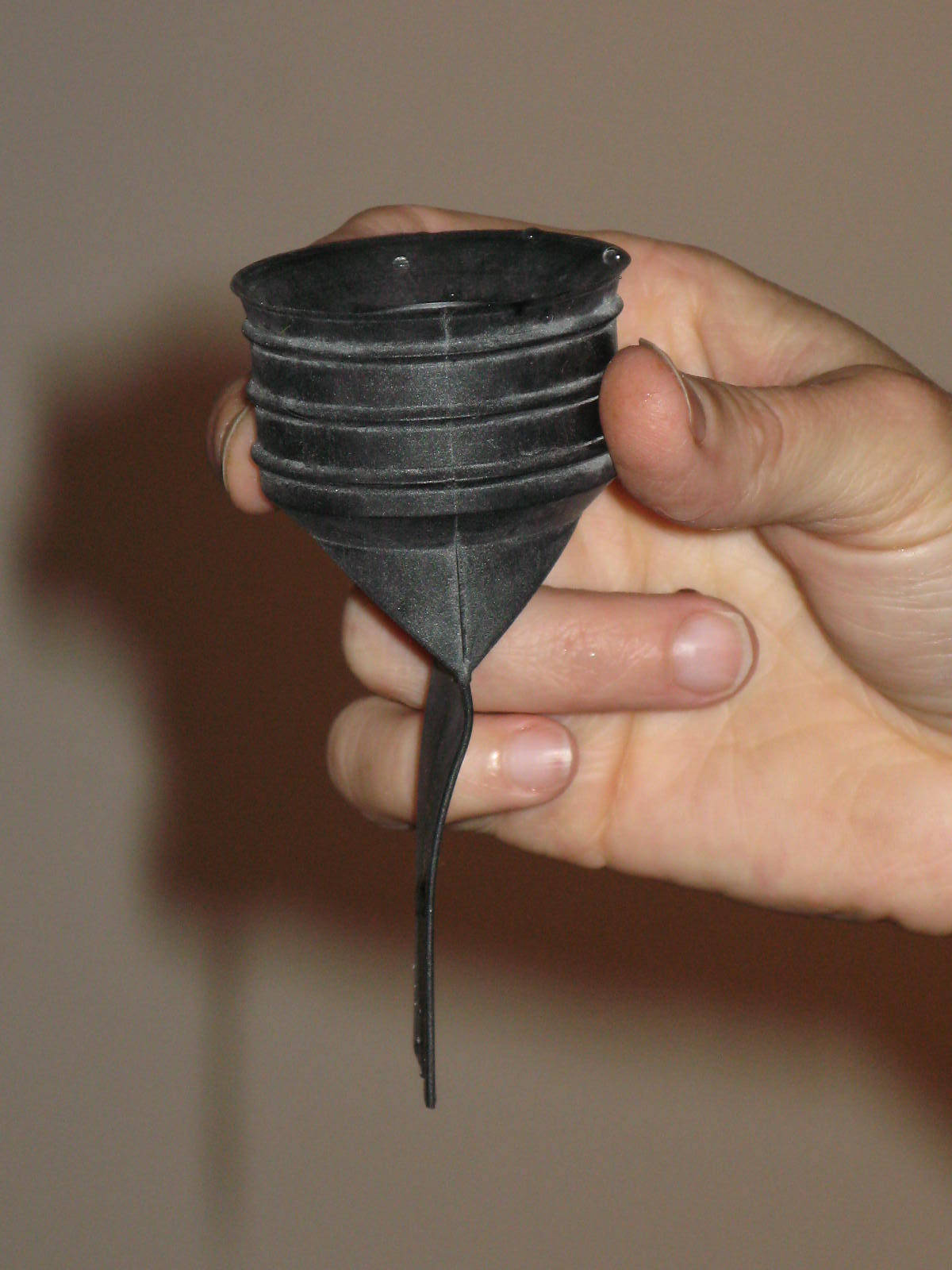
Flat rubber tube for odor control in waterless urinal of Keramag

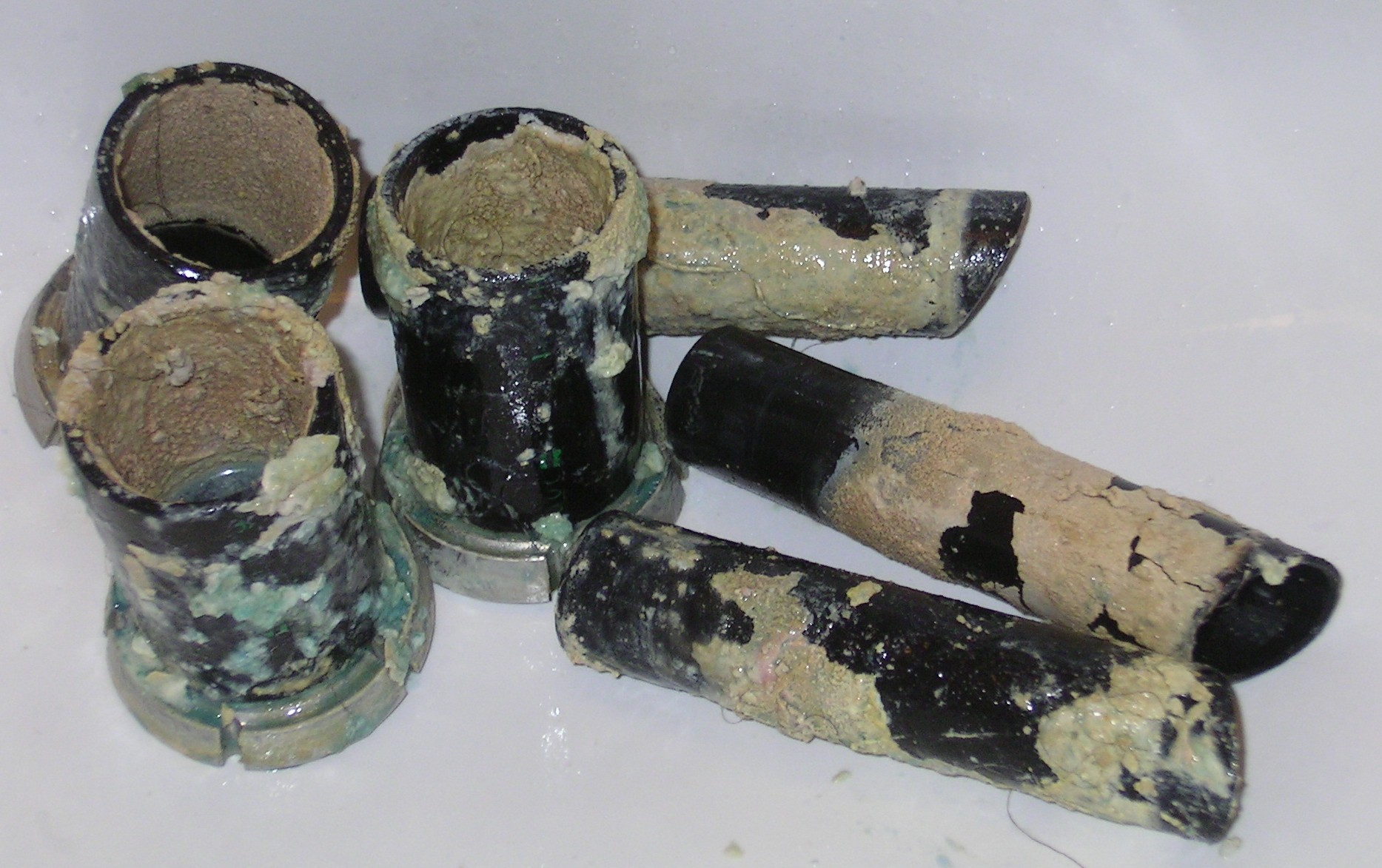
"Urine stone" deposits on plumbing components of a waterless urinal in the Netherlands

== Street urinals ==
In some localities, urinals may be located on public sidewalks or in public areas such as parks. These urinals are often equipped with partitions for the sake of privacy, and some are fully enclosed structures. They may or may not be equipped with water flushing mechanisms.

The first 'pissoirs' were installed in Paris in the 1830s, and the idea gradually gained popularity in other European cities. From a peak in the 1930s when there were over 1,000 in Paris alone, historic urinals have gradually disappeared, in favour of facilities for both sexes. In the 21st century, public urination by men in some locations was again seen as a nuisance, and modern versions of street urinals have been installed.

The Netherlands has a number of strategically placed street urinals in various cities, intended to reduce public urination by drunken men. Amsterdam has the largest collection of historic urinals, with about 30 'Plaskrul' ('pisscurl'), a flushless urinal with a curved privacy screen, in the central city. In recent years, urinals that can be retracted into the ground during the day or between special events have been installed, in order to save space when they are not expected to be needed. When closed they look like a large manhole in a sidewalk. Similar retractable models, such as the model by the Dutch company Urilift, are also seen in the UK and other countries. At night when bars are open they rise out of the sidewalk; some time after the bars close, the urinals return to their manhole configuration so that they are unseen by people during the day.

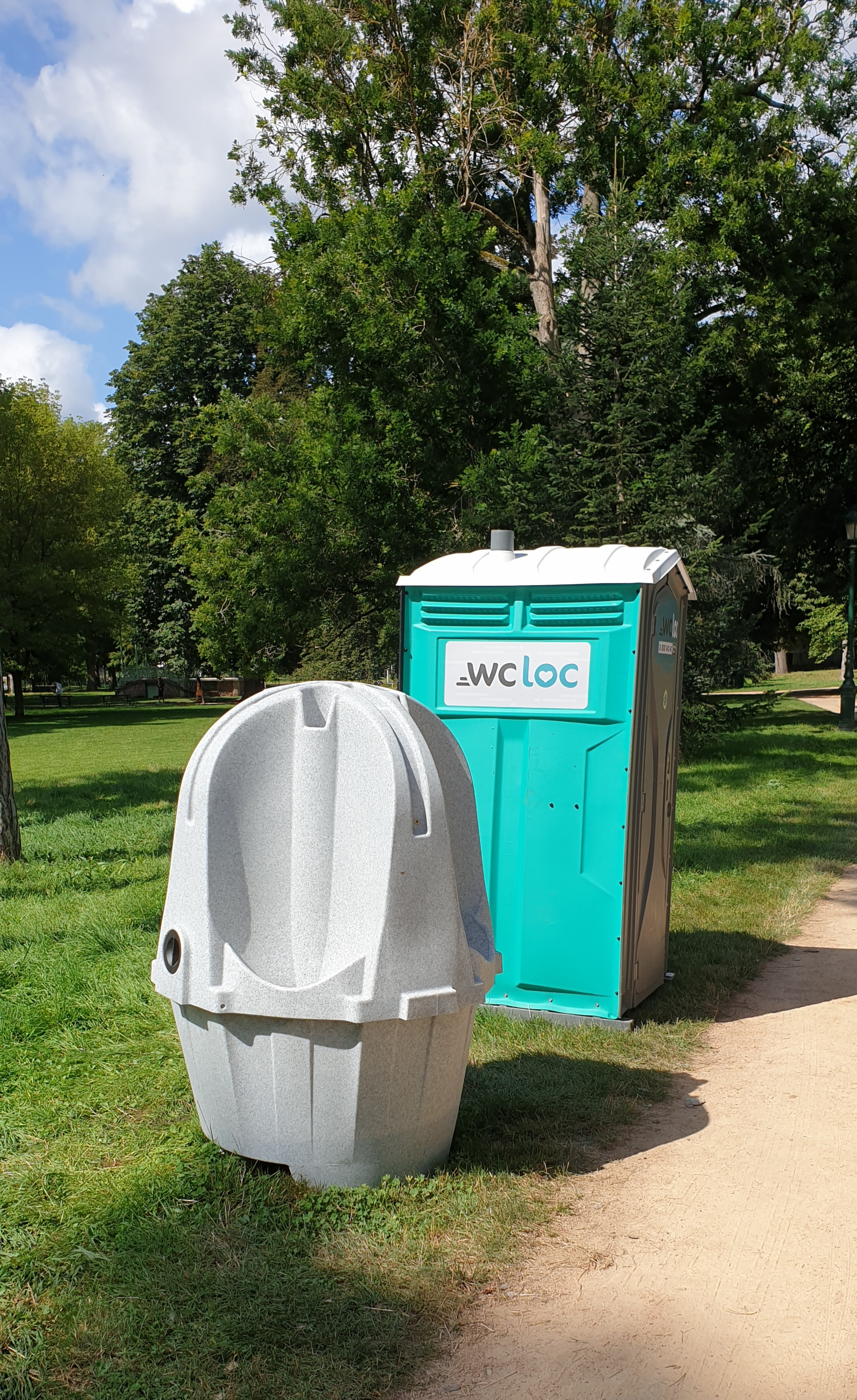
Plastic movable urinal at a venue next to a traditional porta-john. The four sides allow for four users at any given time.

In the Philippines, Marikina was the first city to install street urinals in the late 1990s. When Marikina Mayor Bayani Fernando was appointed chair of the Metropolitan Manila Development Authority, he installed street urinals in the rest of Metro Manila as well.

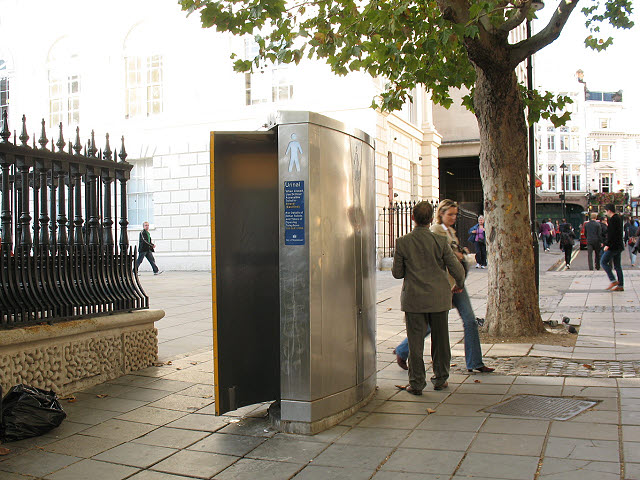
Modern street urinal in London

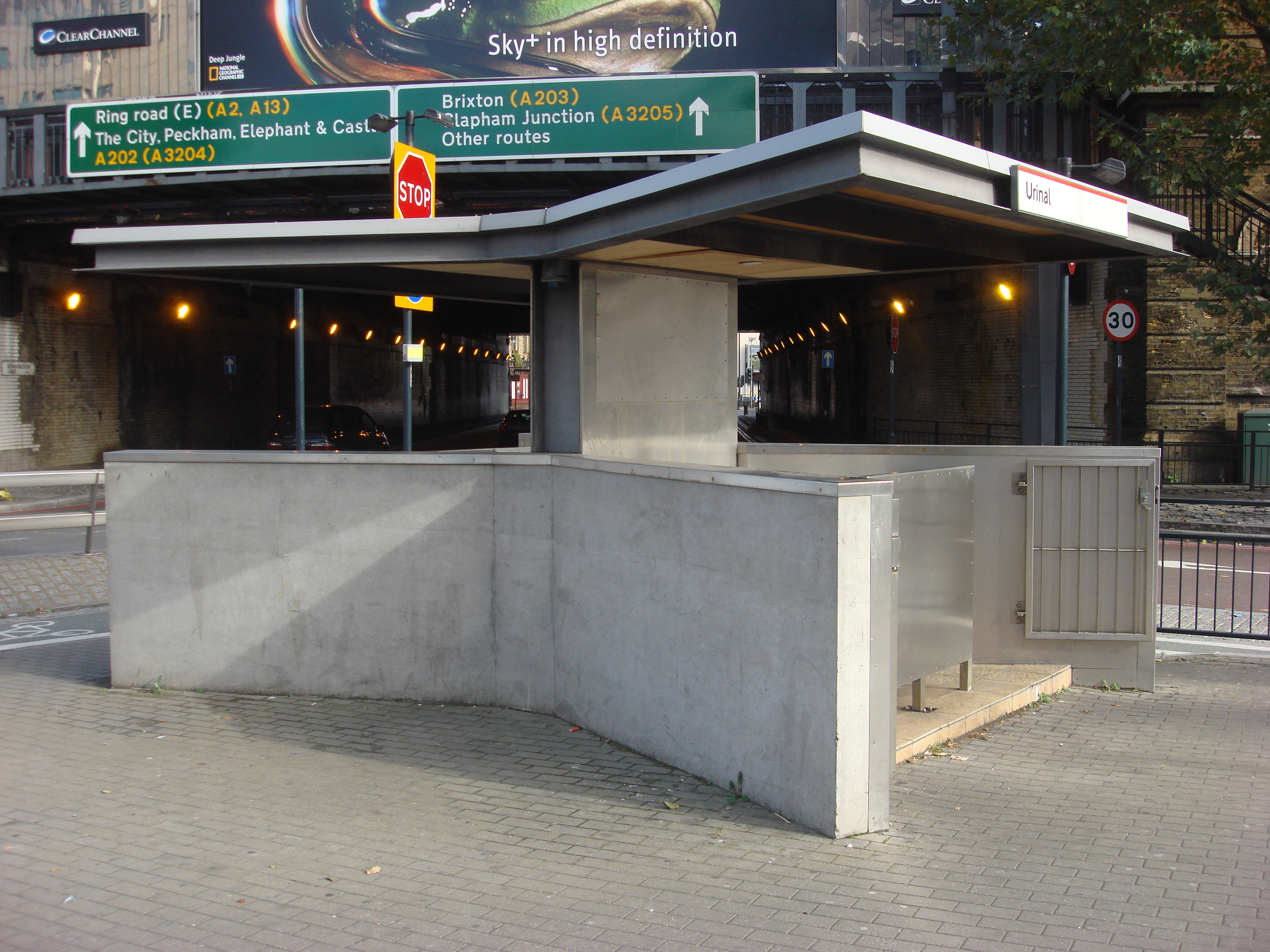
Street urinal in Vauxhall, London

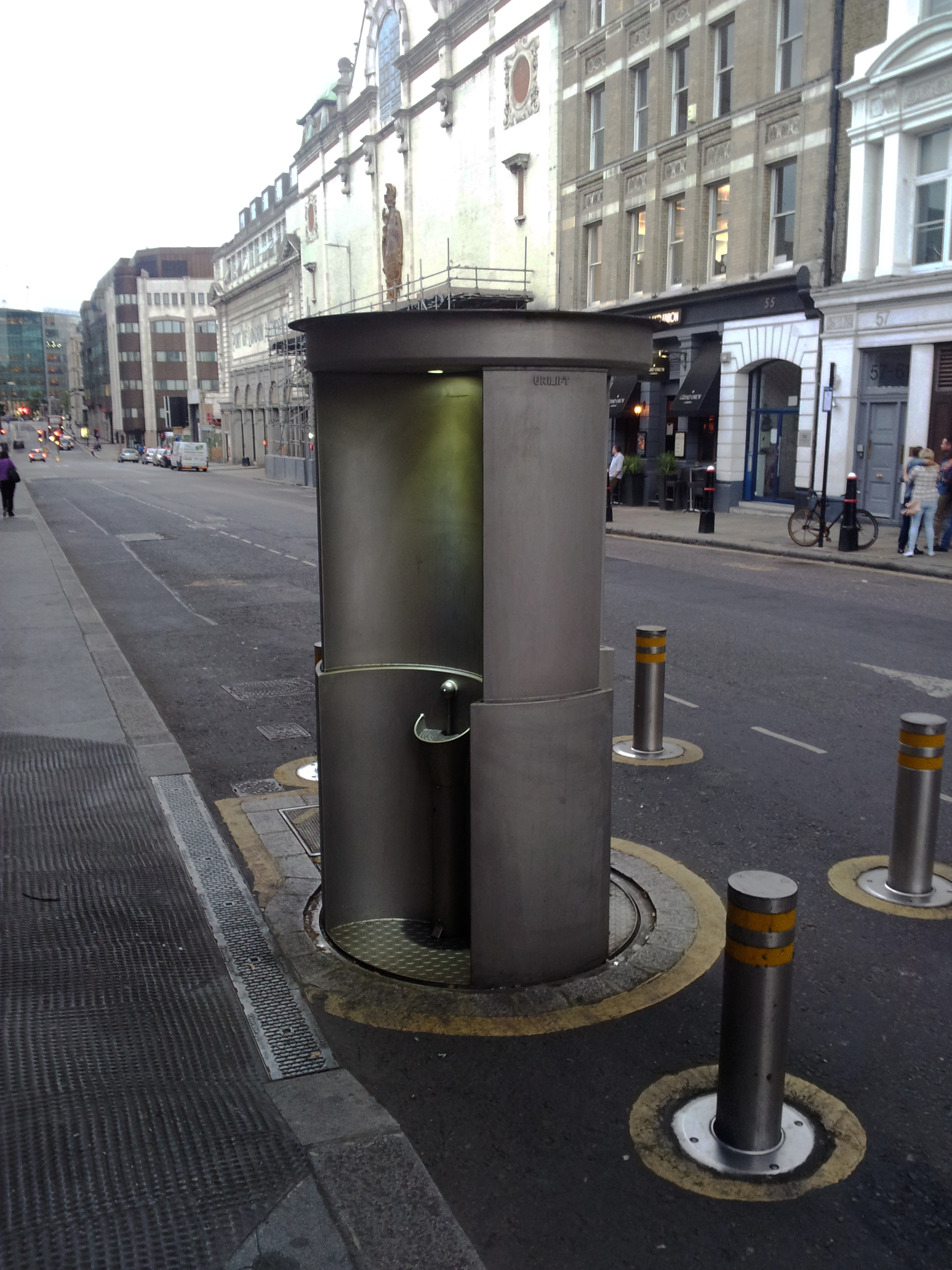
Urilift street urinal can be retracted underground when not needed

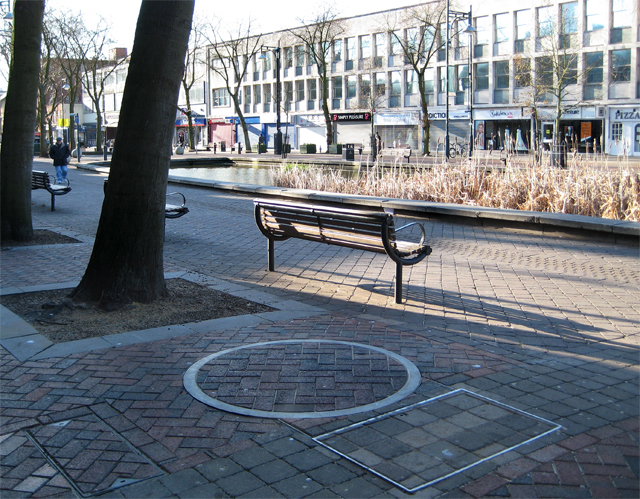
Only a circular ring indicates location of a retracted Urilift urinal when not in use

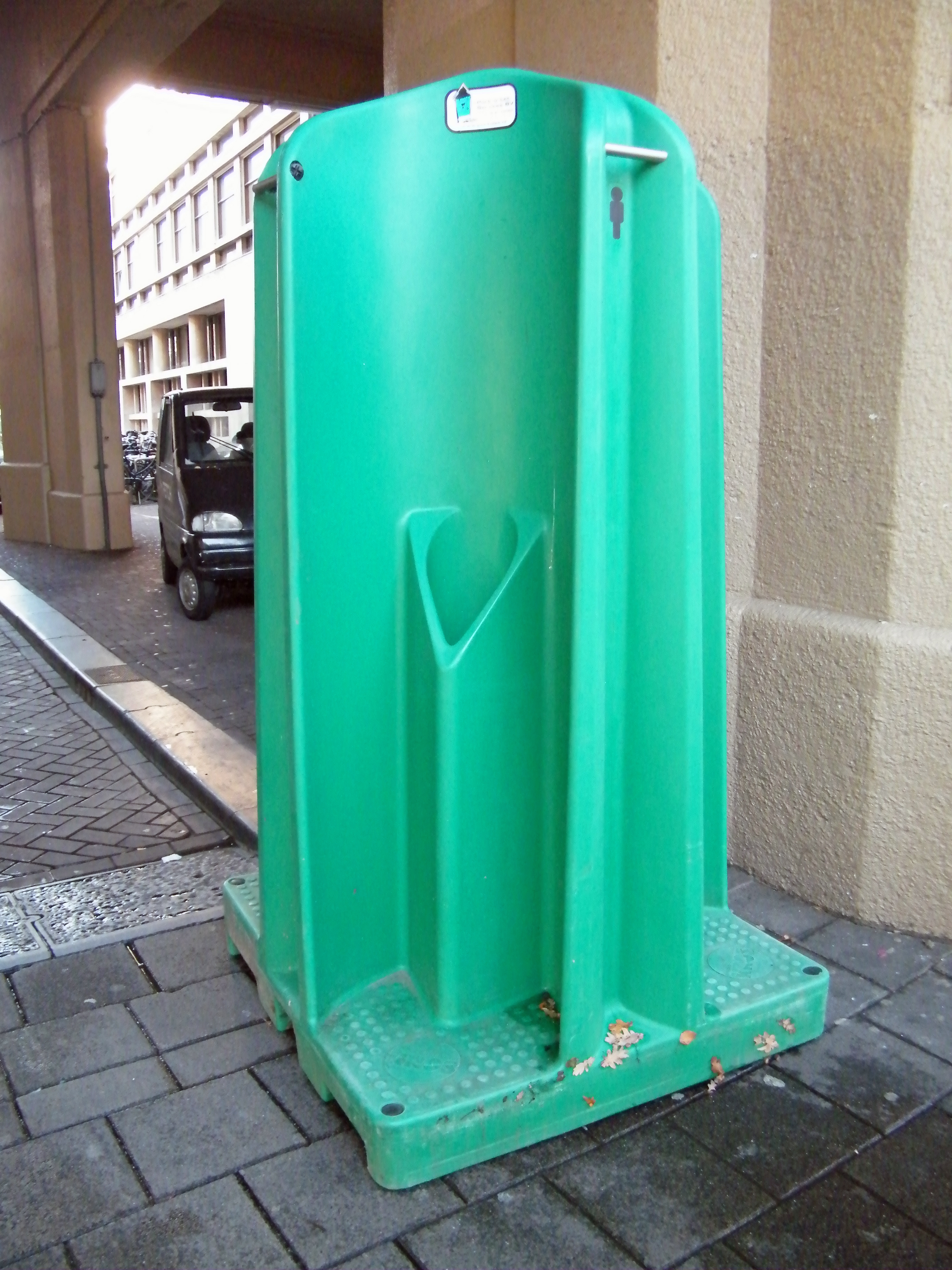
Movable temporary urinal in Amsterdam

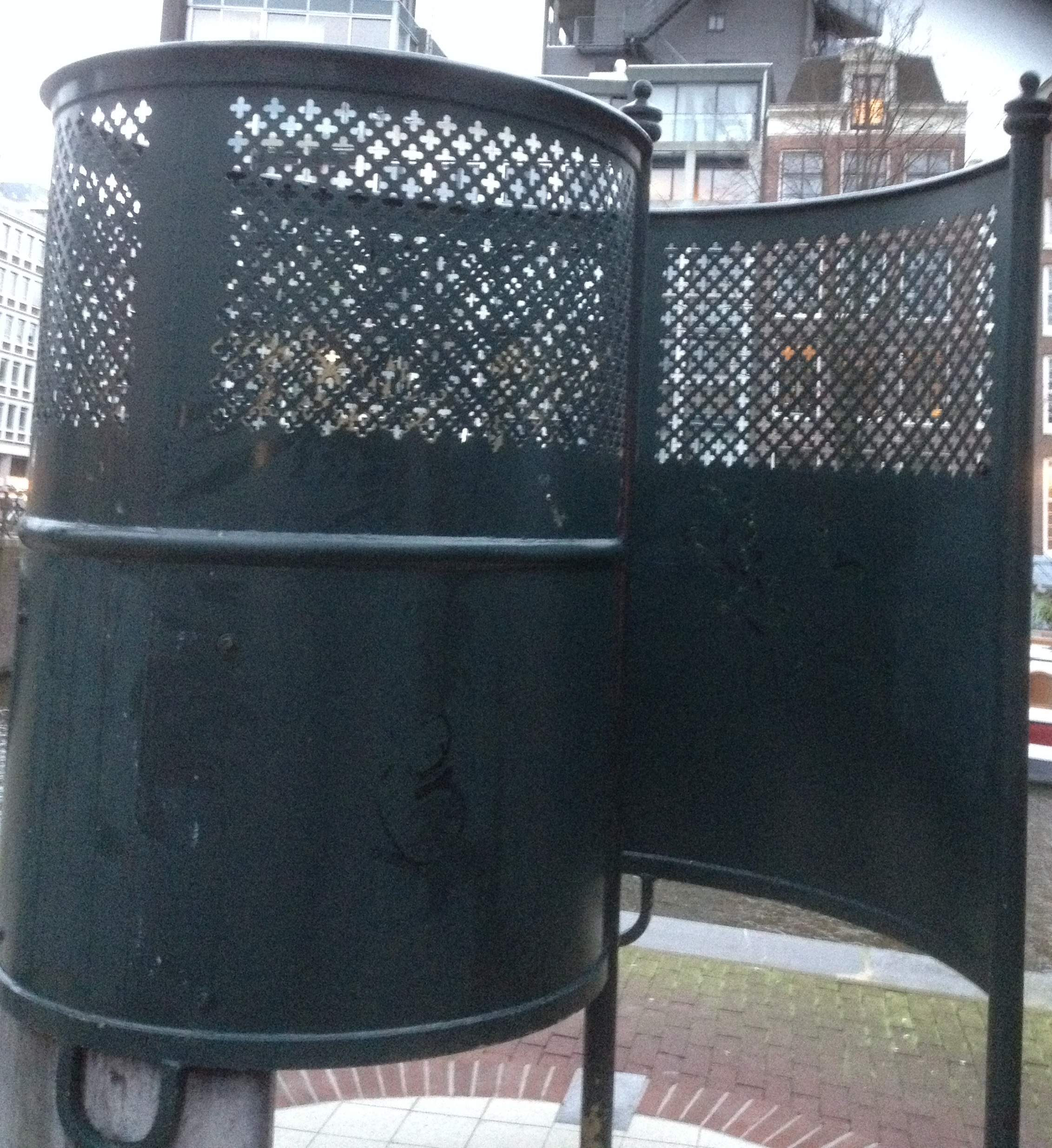
Traditional krul urinal in Amsterdam

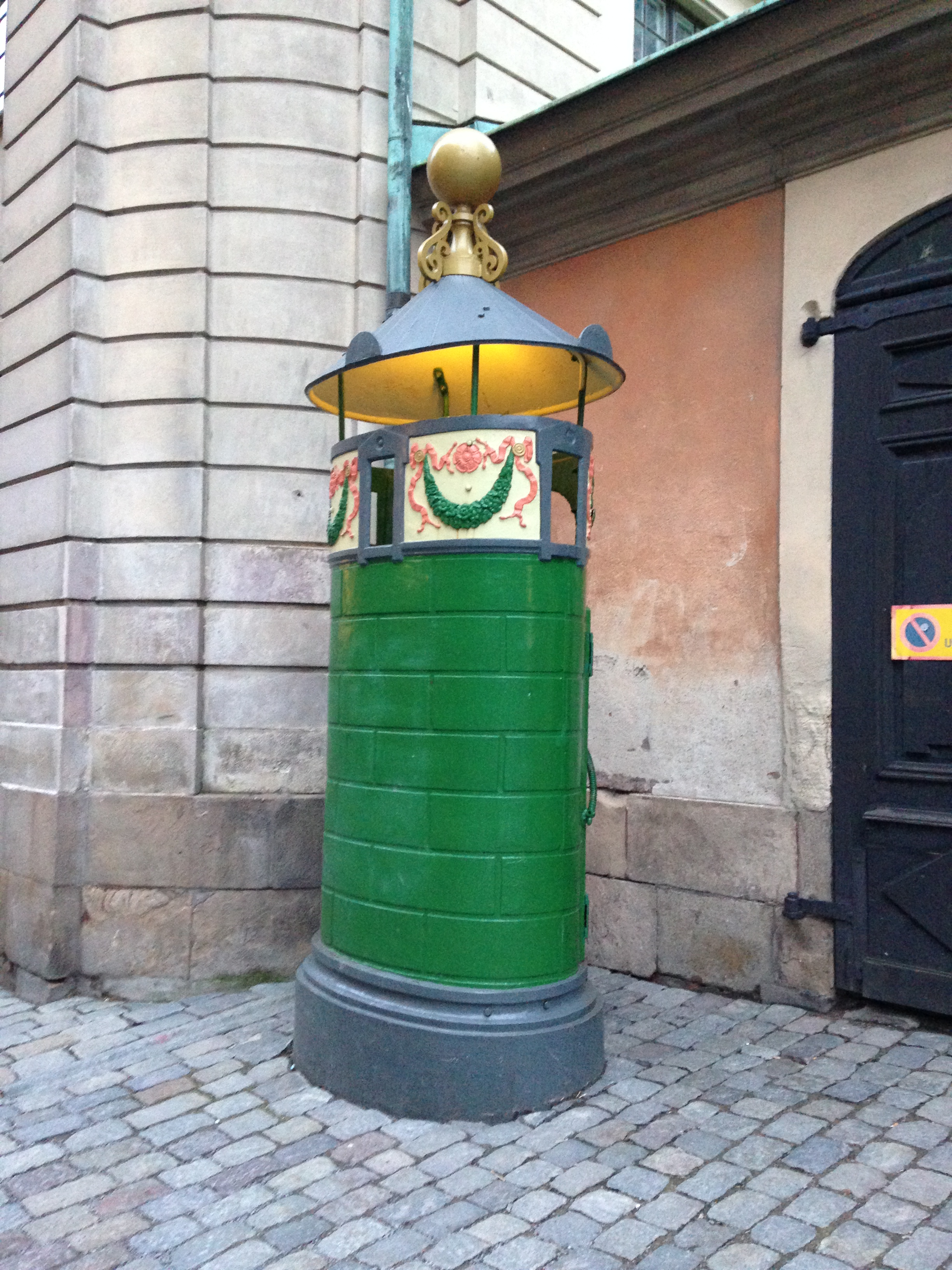
Street urinal in Stockholm

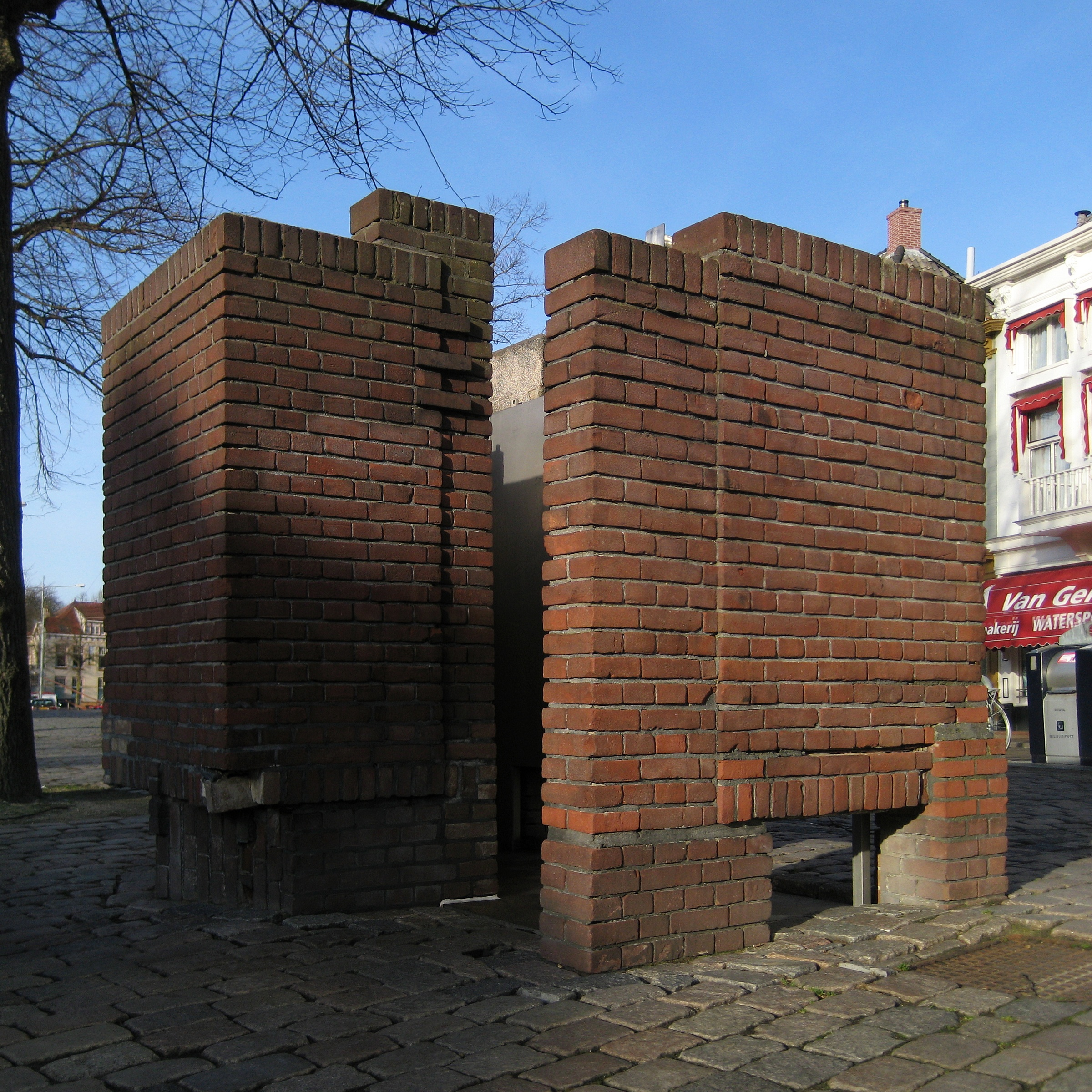
Street urinal in Groningen

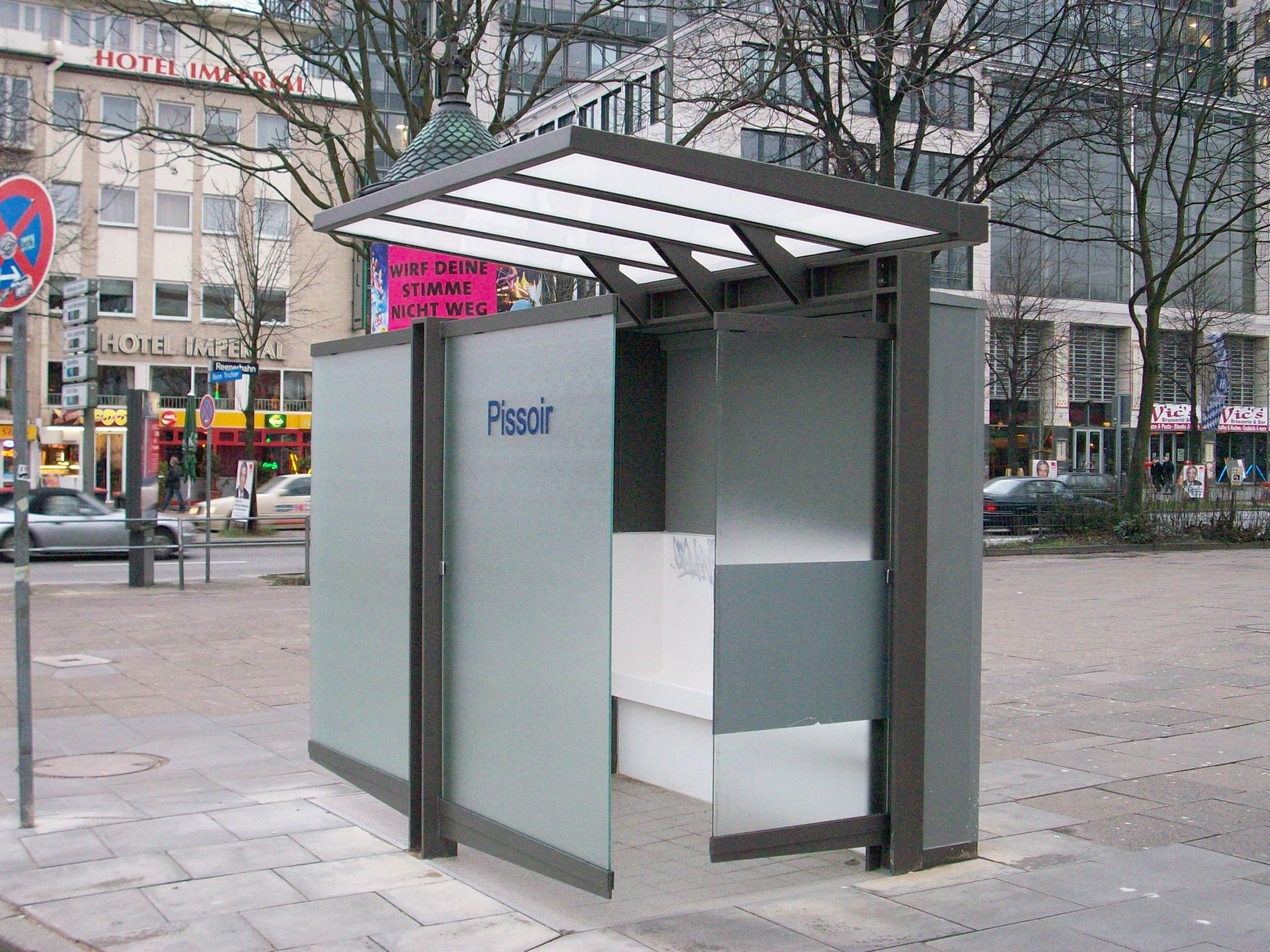
Modernist street urinal in Hamburg, Germany

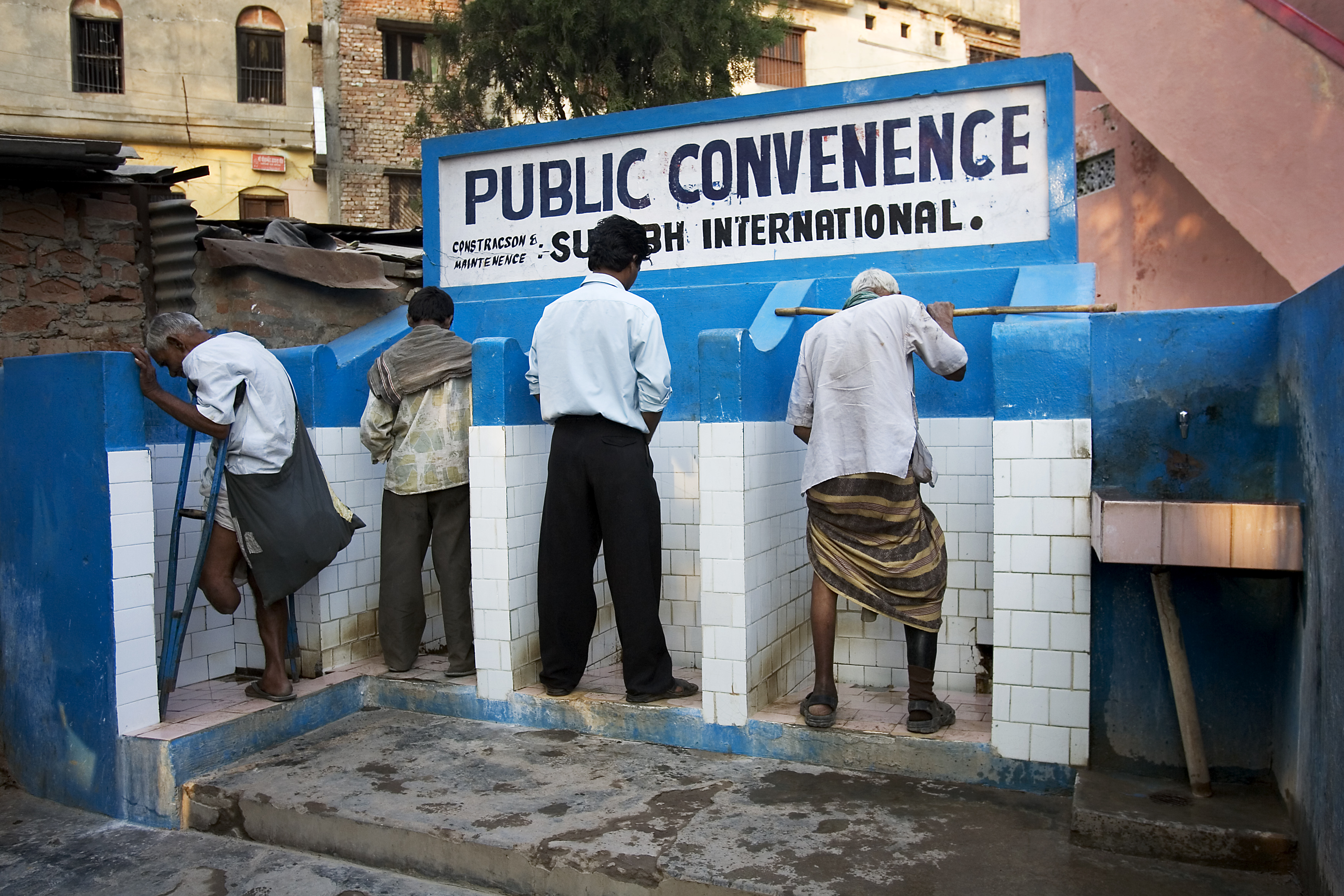
"Public Convenience" in Varanasi, Benares, India

== Special urinals ==
=== Urinals designed for females ===
In the Western world, women are generally taught to sit or squat while urinating. Many therefore do not know how – or even that it is possible – for a female to aim her urine stream as would be required to use a stand-up urinal. Thus, several different types of urinals have been designed for women that do not require the user to aim their urine stream. A typical user could thus theoretically approach such a urinal squatting backwards over it without necessarily trying to aim their stream.

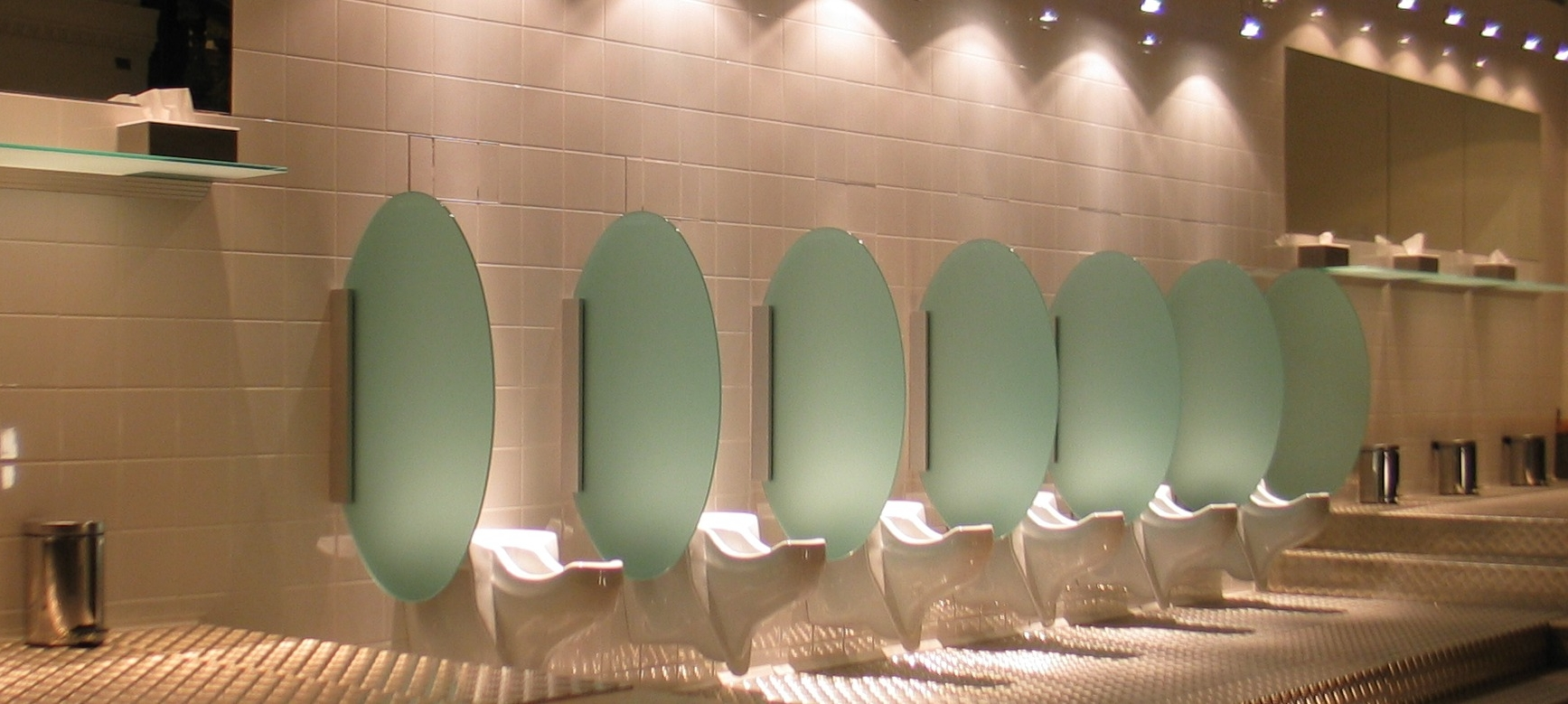
Urinals designed for women

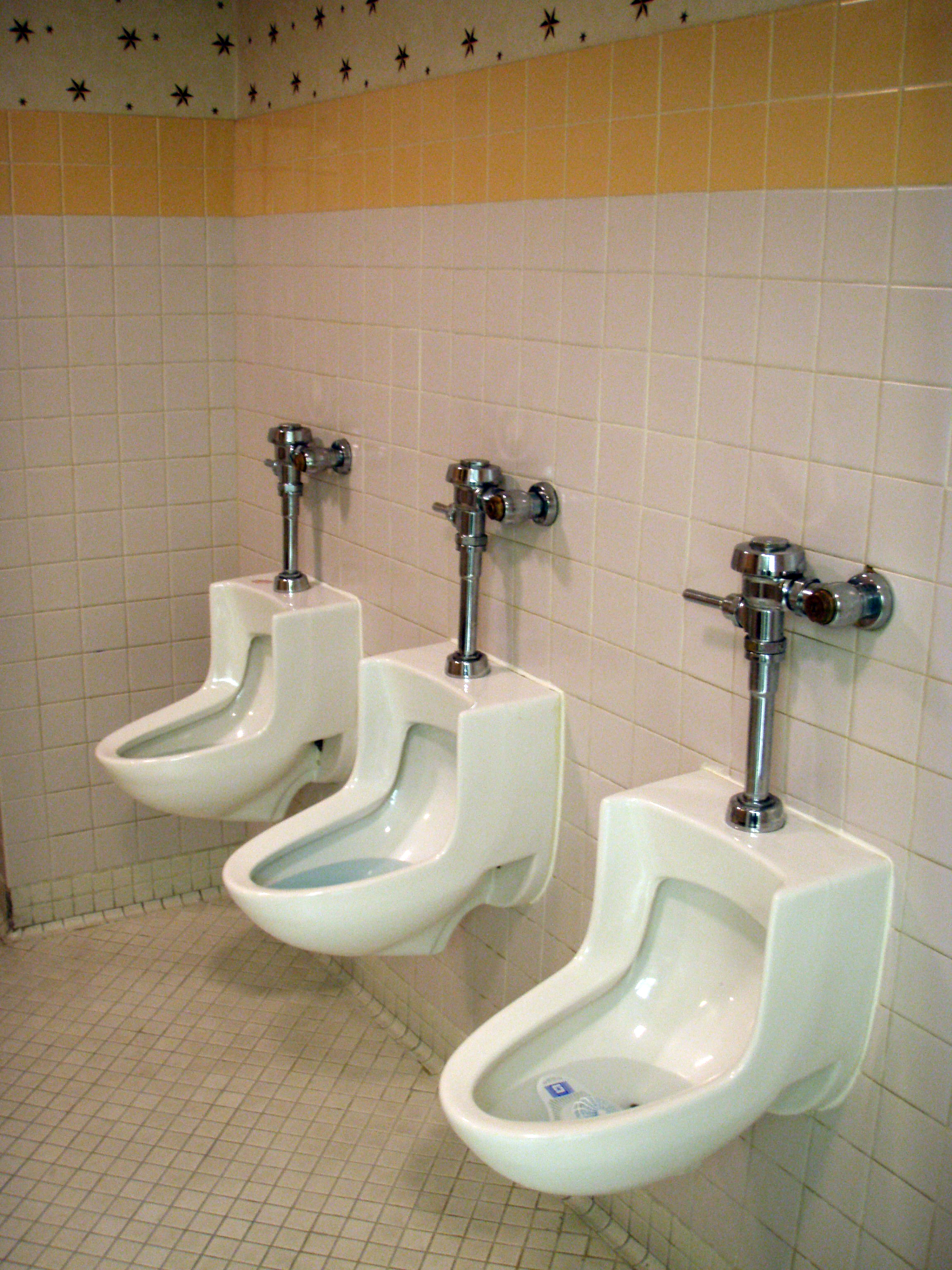
Unisex urinals which can be used by either gender

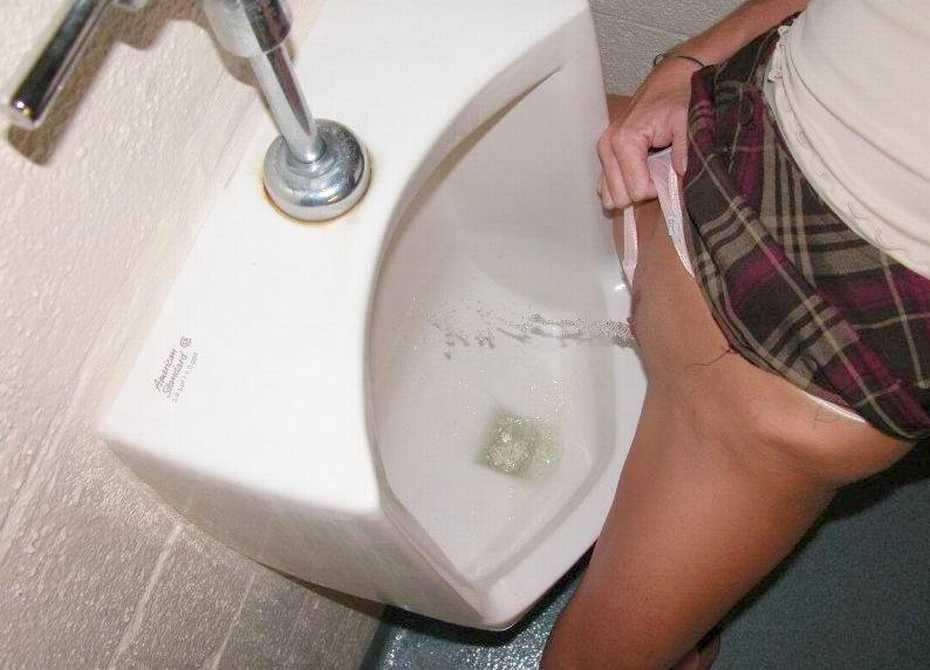
A woman urinating into a male urinal in a standing position

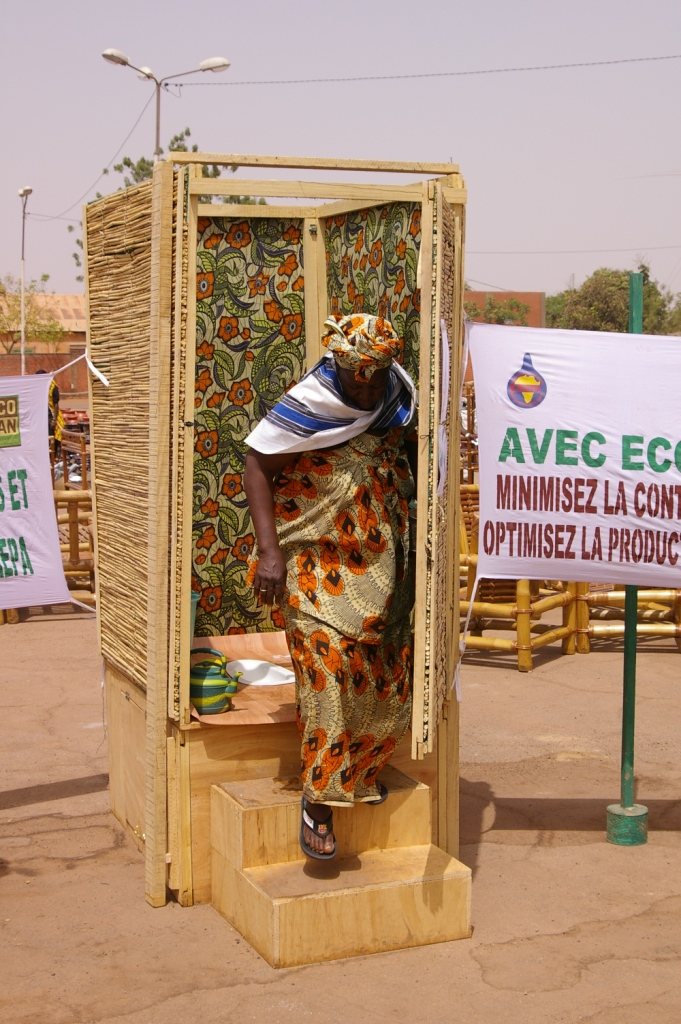
A mobile light-weight urinal for women

=== Arts and interactive urinals ===
Kisses! is a controversial urinal designed by the female Dutch designer Meike van Schijndel. It is shaped like an open pair of red lips. In early March 2004, the National Organization for Women (NOW) took offense to the new urinals that Virgin Atlantic decided to install in the Virgin Atlantic clubhouse at John F Kennedy International Airport in New York City. After receiving many angry phone calls from female customers, Virgin Atlantic Vice President John Riordan called NOW to apologize. Protestors surmised a connection to oral sex or urolagnia, and based their complaints on the urinals being sexist. A McDonald's restaurant in the Netherlands removed them after a customer complained to the head office in the United States.

Interactive urinals have been developed in a number of countries, allowing users to entertain themselves during urination. One example is the Toylet, a video game system produced by the Japanese company Sega that allows users to play video games using their urine to control the on-screen action.

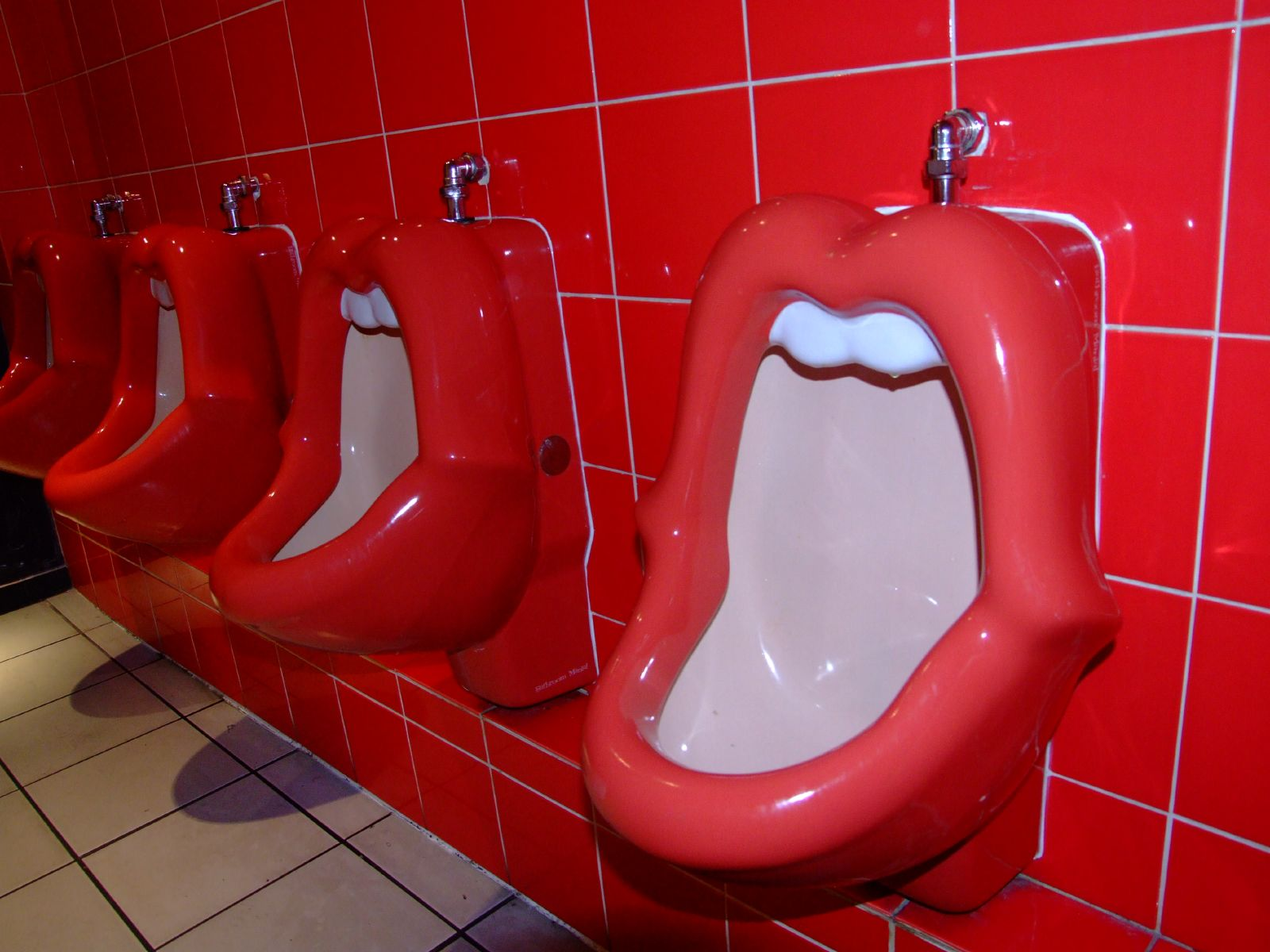
Controversial Kisses! urinals were designed by a woman.

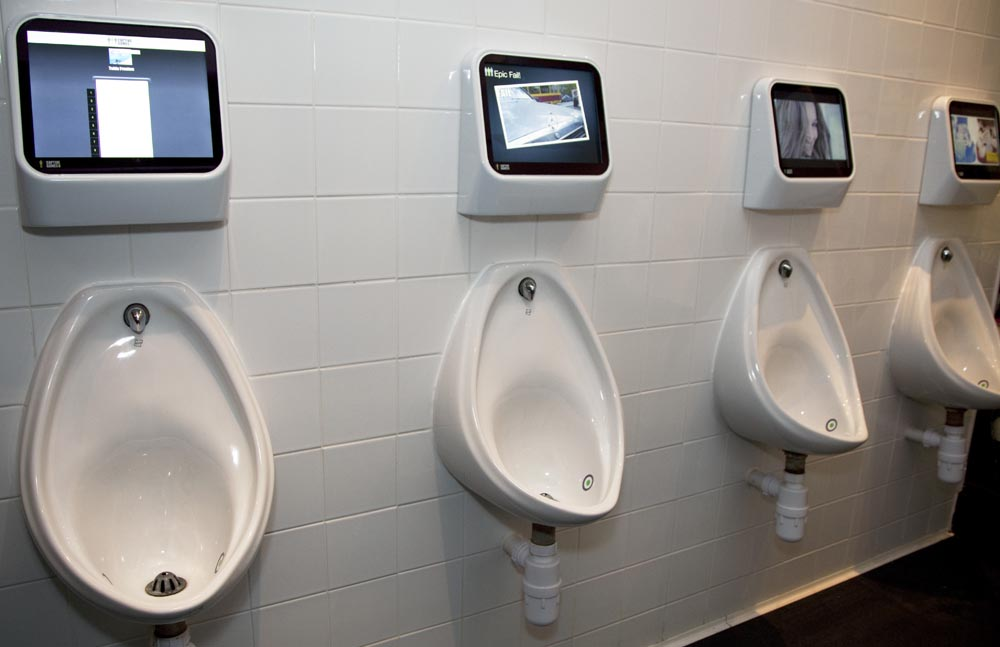
Advertising displays for a "captive audience" in London

=== Makeshift urinals ===
During military operations, such as the Korean War, Vietnam War, or Operation Desert Storm, "piss tubes" were used as makeshift urinals. To make one, soldiers would affix an inverted disposable water bottle on one end of a rigid tube, burying the other end. Removing the base of the bottle made a funnel which would be left at the proper height. Deposited urine simply soaked into the ground; when the area became saturated, the device was relocated.

=== In vehicles ===
As of 2008, the aircraft manufacturer Airbus offered its customers the option of installing urinals in its A380 aircraft.

== History ==
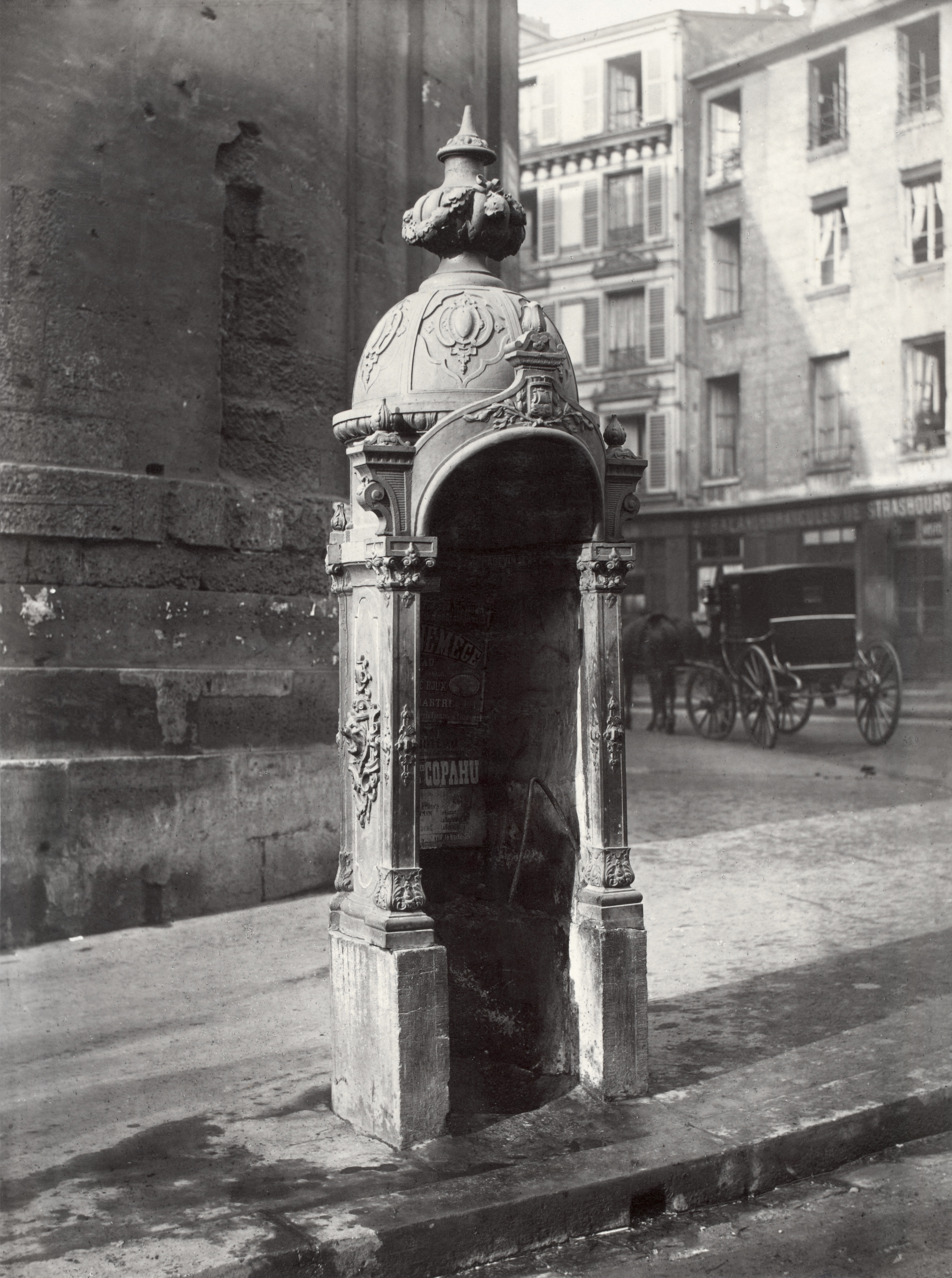
'Colonne Rambuteau', photographed 1865

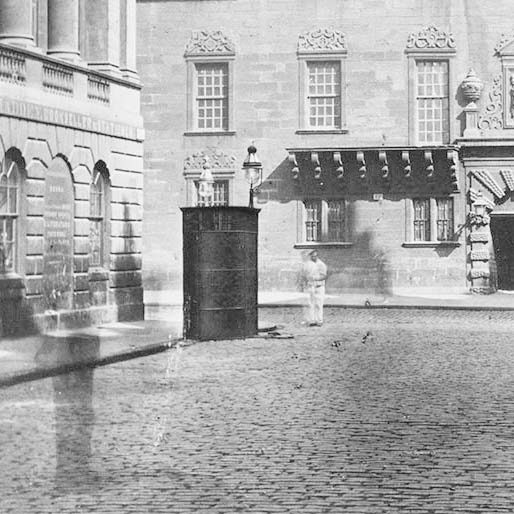
A cast iron urinal in College Street, Glasgow, installed 1850–1854, photographed in 1866

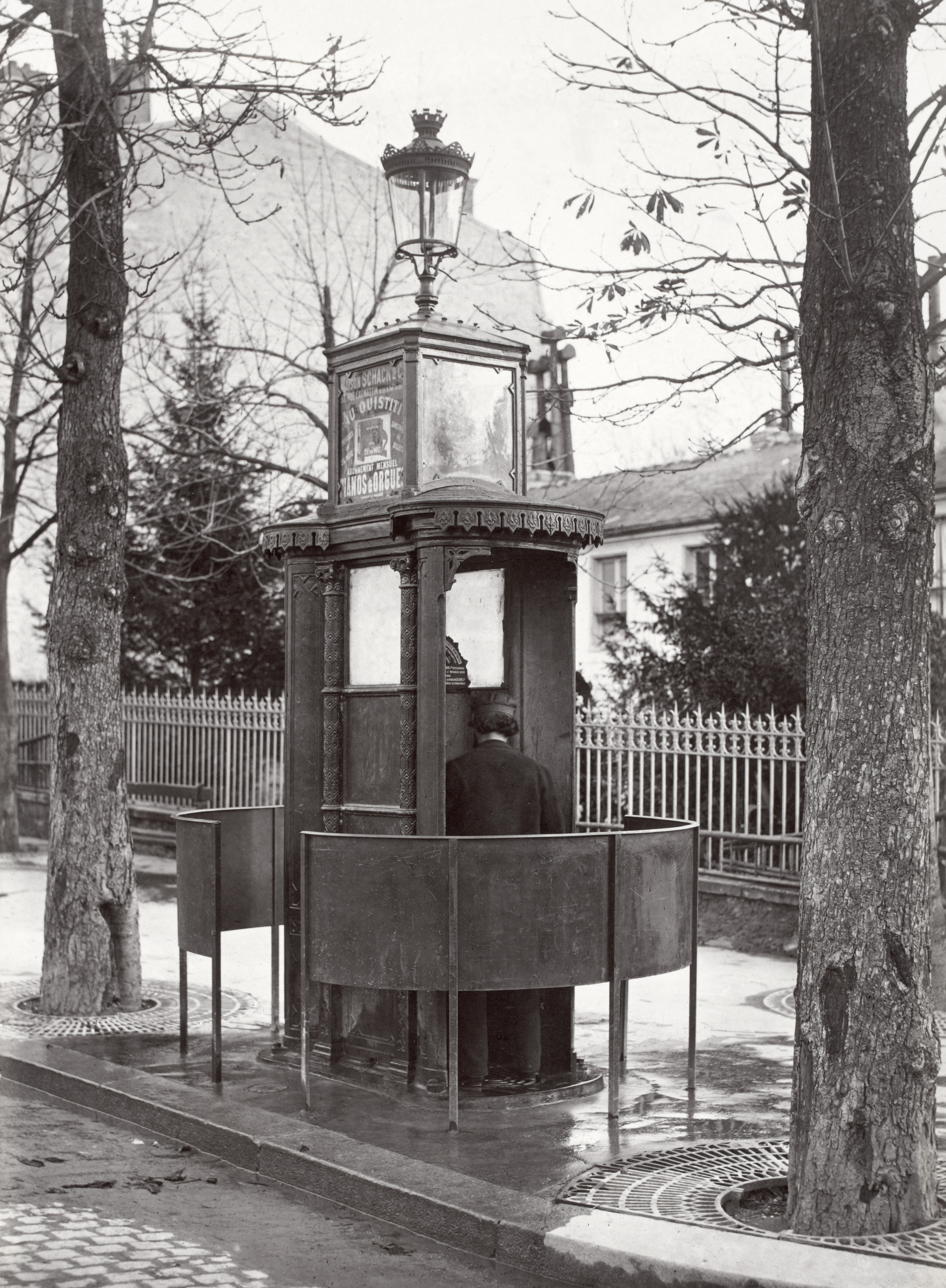
A later Paris pissoir in cast iron, photographed c. 1865

In the spring of 1830, the city government of Paris decided to install the first public urinals on the major boulevards. They were put in place by the summer, but in July of the same year, many were destroyed through their use as materials for street barricades during the French Revolution of 1830.

The urinals were re-introduced in Paris after 1834, when over 400 were installed by Claude-Philibert Barthelot, comte de Rambuteau, the Préfet of the Department of the Seine. Having a simple cylindrical shape, built of masonry, open on the street side, and ornately decorated on the other side as well as the cap, they were popularly known as 'colonnes Rambuteau' ('Rambuteau columns'). In response, Rambuteau suggested the name 'vespasiennes', in reference to the 1st century Roman emperor Titus Flavius Vespasianus, who placed a tax on urine collected from public toilets for use in tanning. This is the usual term by which street urinals are known in the French speaking world, although 'pissoir' and 'pissotière' are also in common use.

In Paris, the next version was a masonry column that allowed for the pasting of posters on the side facing the footpath, creating a tradition that continues to this day (as a Morris column, a column with an elaborate roof and without the urinal).

Cast iron urinals were developed in the United Kingdom, with the Scottish firm of Walter McFarlane and Company casting urinals at their Saracen Foundry and erecting the first at Paisley Road, Glasgow in October 1850. By the end of 1852, nearly 50 cast iron urinals had been installed in Glasgow, including designs with more than one stall. Unlike Rambuteau's columns, which were entirely open at the front, McFarlane's one-man urinals were designed with spiral cast iron screens that allowed the user to be hidden from sight, and his multi-stall urinals were completely hidden within ornate, modular cast iron panels. Three manufacturers in Glasgow, Walter Macfarlane & Co., George Smith (Sun Foundry) and James Allan Snr & Son (Elmbank Foundry), supplied the majority of cast iron urinals across Britain and exported them around the world, including Australia and Argentina.

Back in Paris, cast iron urinals were introduced as part of Baron Haussmann's remodelling of the city. A large variety of designs were produced in subsequent decades, housing two to 8 stalls, typically only screening the central portion of the user from public view, with the head and feet still visible. Screens were also added to Rambuteau columns. At the peak of their spread in the 1930s, there were 1,230 pissoirs in Paris, but by 1966 their number had decreased to 329. From 1980 they were replaced systematically with new technology, a unisex, enclosed, automatically self-cleaning unit called the Sanisette.

In Berlin, the first pissoirs, in wood, were erected in 1863. In order to provide a design as distinguished as in other cities, several architectural design competitions were organised in 1847, 1865 and 1877. The last design, proposed by a city councillor, was the one adopted in 1878, a cast-iron octagonal structure with seven stalls and a peaked roof, known locally as a Café Achteck ('Octagon Cafe'). In common with British designs, they provided complete enclosure, and were provided with interior lighting. Their number increased to 142 by 1920, but there are now only about a dozen remaining in use.

A similar design was adopted in Vienna, though simpler, smaller and hexagonal. They were equipped with a novel "oil system", patented by Wilhelm Beetz in 1882, where a type of oil was used to neutralise odours, dispensing with the necessity for plumbing. About 15 are still in use, and one has been restored and set up as a display in the Vienna Technical Museum.

In central Amsterdam, there are about 35 pee curls, which consist of a raised metal screen that curls in a spiral enclosing a single urinal stall, including some two-person examples with the same details but a simpler shape. Though the design first emerged in the 1870s, an updated design by Joan van der Mey dates from 1916. All the remaining examples were restored in 2008.

Pissoirs of various sizes and designs, but mostly in patterned cast-iron, can still be found dotted across the UK, with a few in London, but especially in Birmingham and Bristol. A solitary example of Walter McFarlane's one-man spiral urinal remains in Thorn Park, Plymouth. A number have been restored and relocated to the grounds of various open-air museums and heritage railway lines.

Rectangular pissoirs, with elaborate patterned cast-iron panels, similar in design to some of the UK ones, were installed in the city of Sydney, Australia, in 1880 and Melbourne, Australia, in the period 1903–1918. Of at least 40 that were made, nine remain in place and in use on the streets in and around central Melbourne, and have been classified by the National Trust since 1998.

In recent years, temporary pissoirs with multiple unscreened urinals around a central column have been introduced in the UK. A temporary pissoir for women called the 'Peeasy' is used in Switzerland.

Until the 1990s, street urinals were a common sight in Paris (France), and in the 1930s more than 1200 were in service. They were famous among foreign tourists. Parisians referred to them as vespasiennes, the name being derived from that of the Roman Emperor Vespasian, who, according to an anecdote, imposed a tax on urine. Beginning in the 1990s, the vespasiennes (renowned for their smell and lack of hygiene) were gradually replaced by Sanisettes. Today only one vespasienne remains in the city (on Boulevard Arago), and it is still regularly used. They still exist in other French cities and in other countries.

The last surviving vespasienne, on Boulevard Arago in Paris

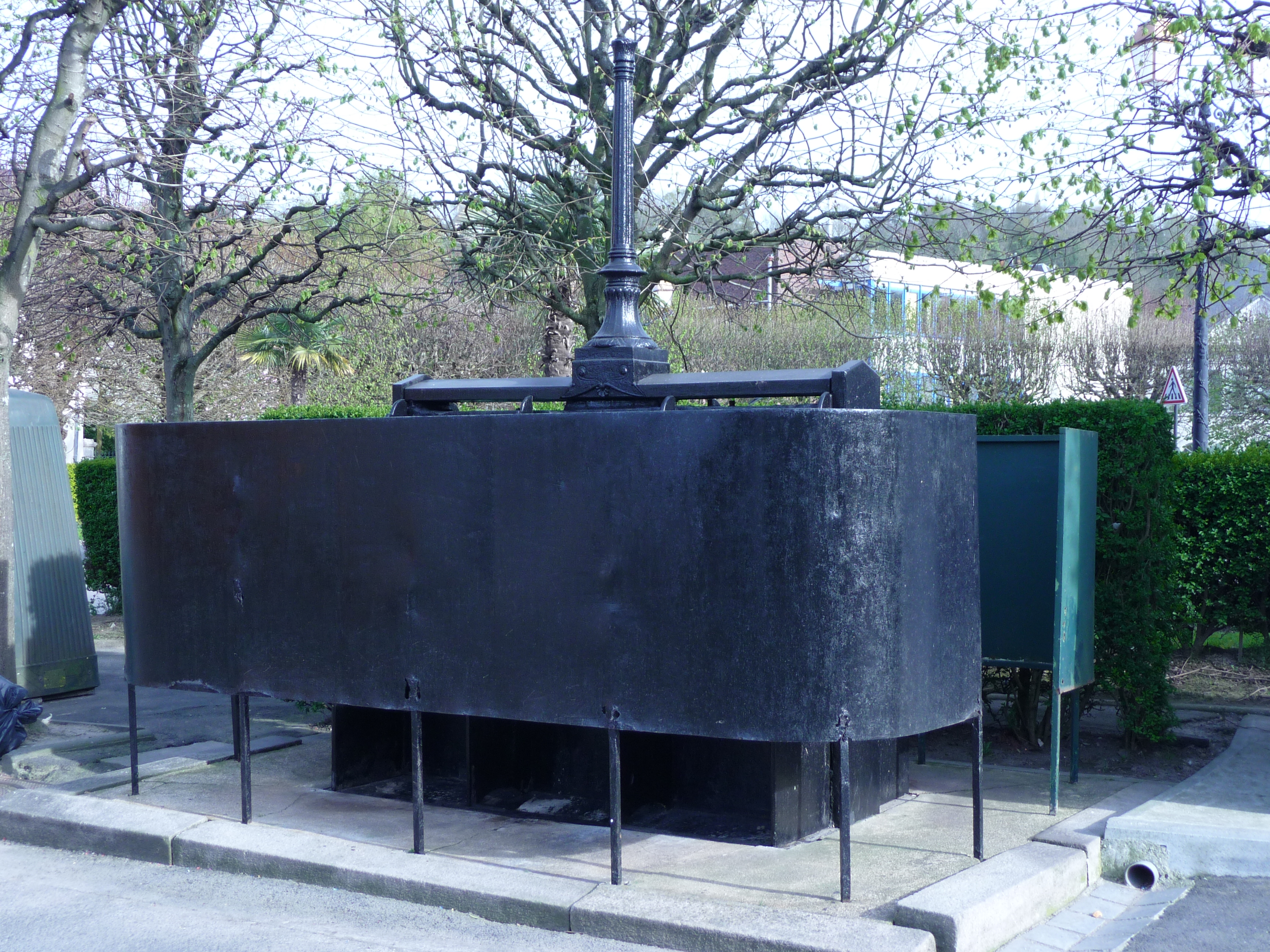
Vespasienne in Honfleur, France

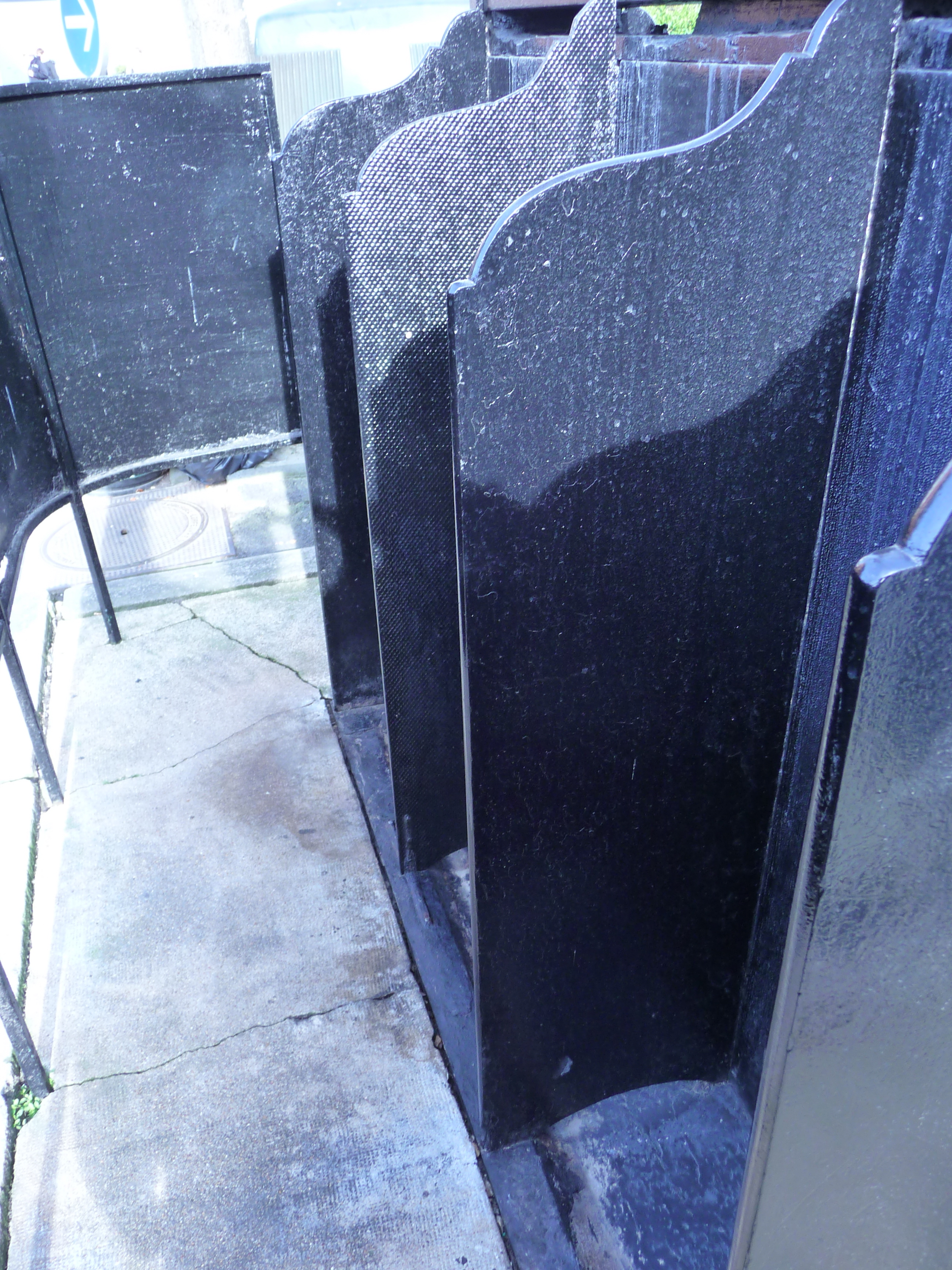
Interior of Honfleur vespasienne

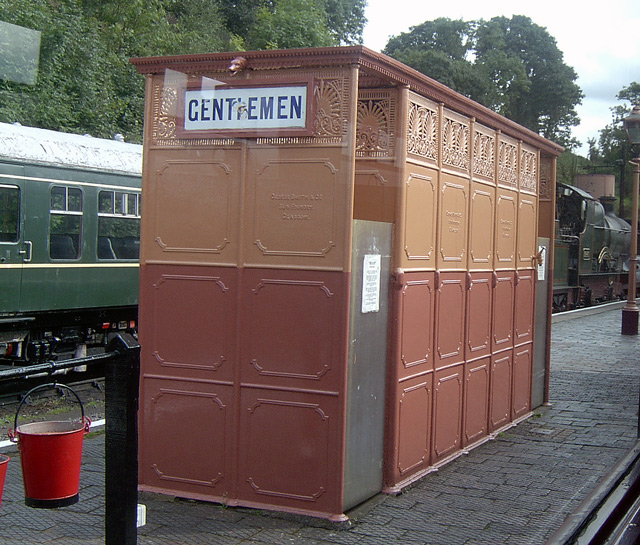
Vintage British urinal, no longer in service

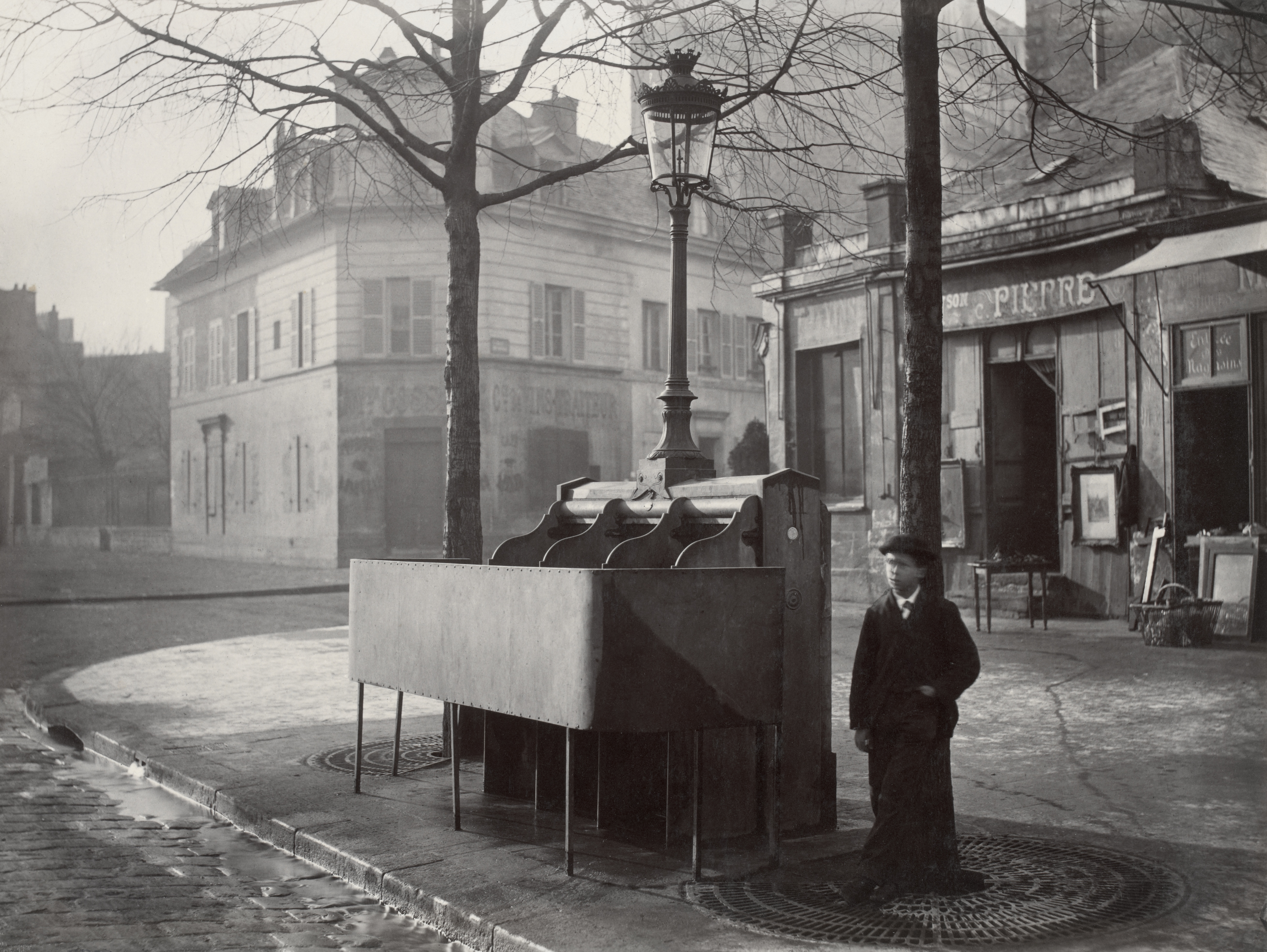
A pissoir on Avenue du Maine, Paris c. 1865. Photographed by Charles Marville.

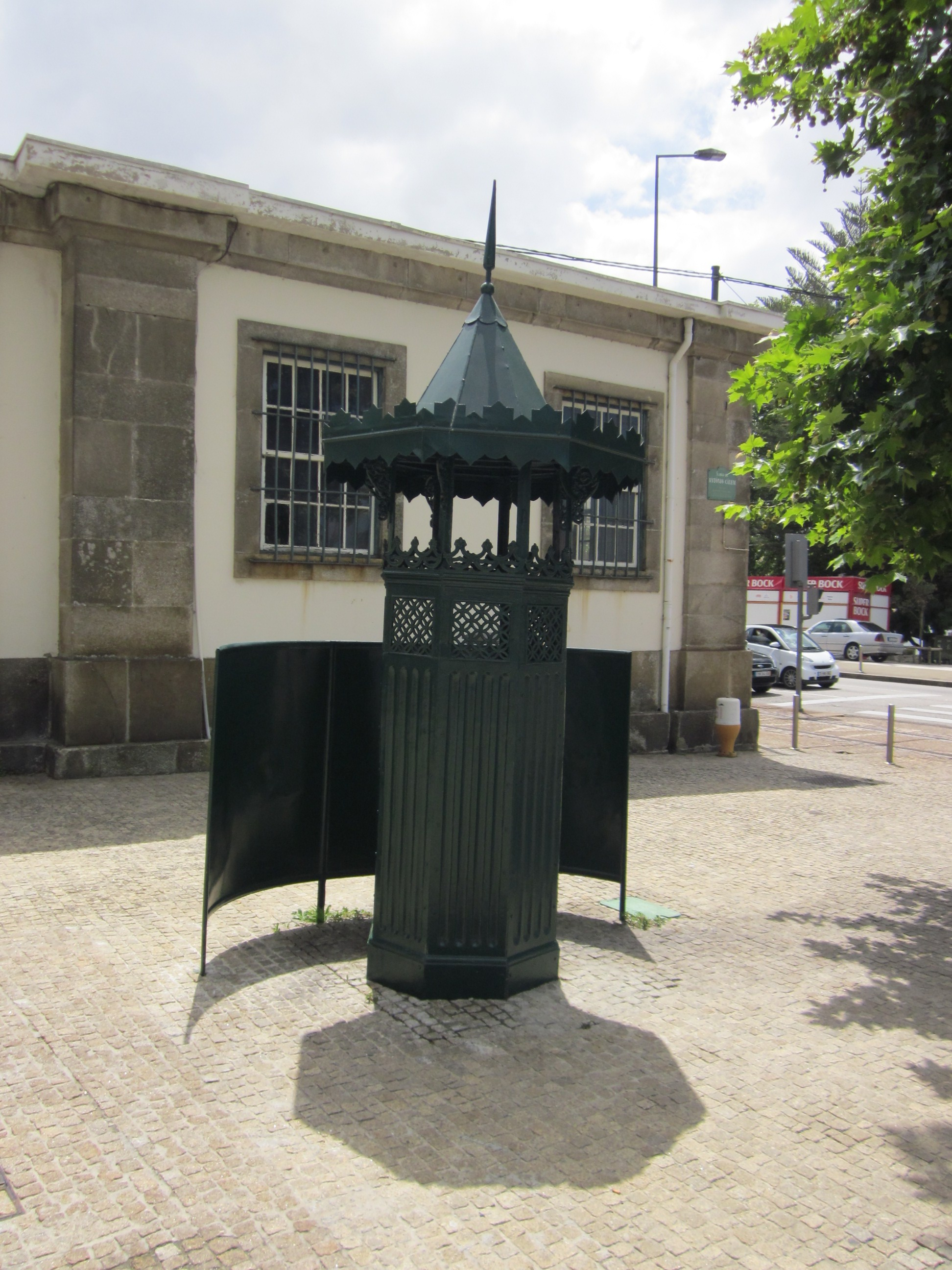
Outdoor urinal in Porto, Portugal

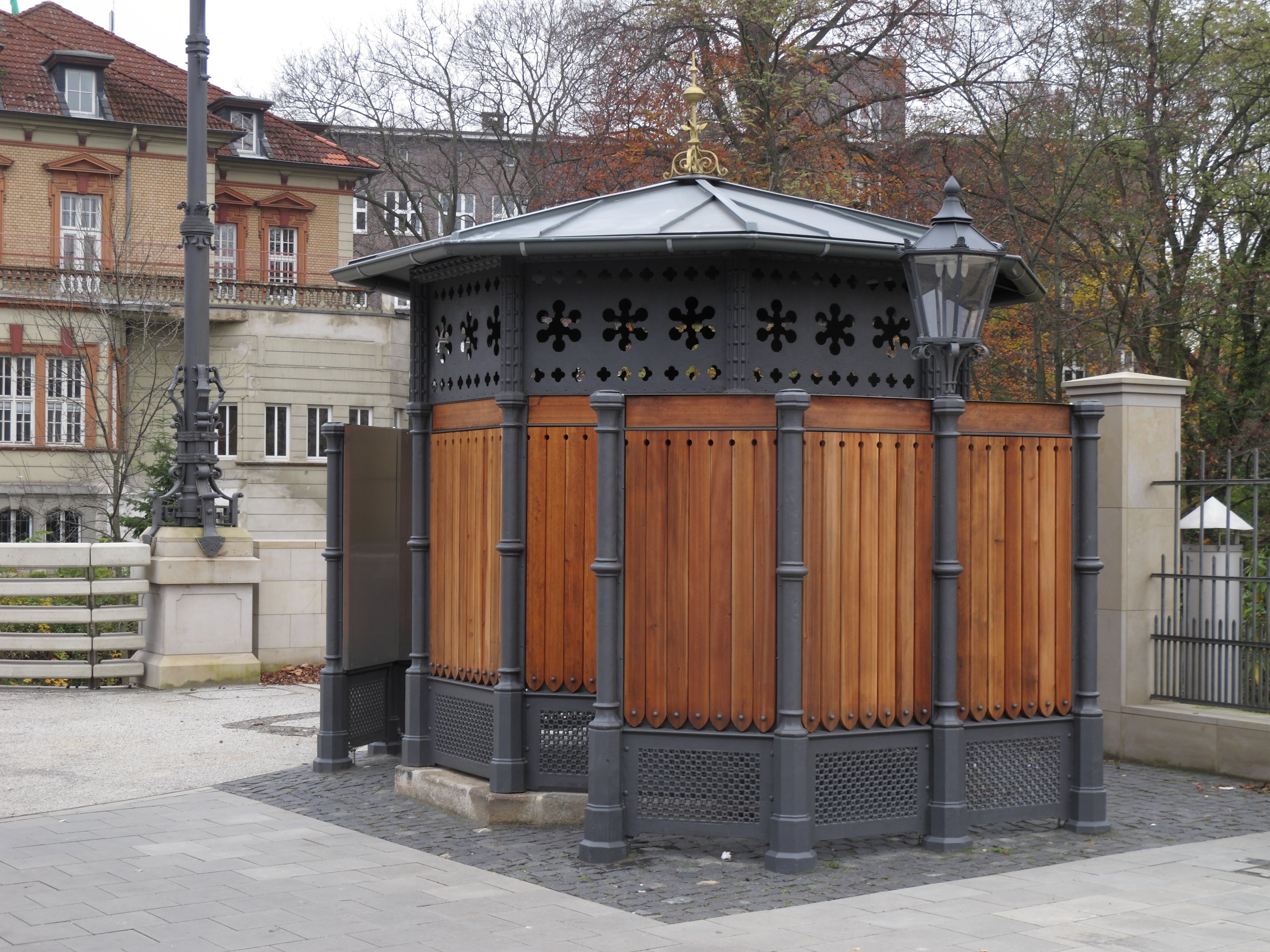
Restored heritage protected public urinal in Braunschweig, Germany

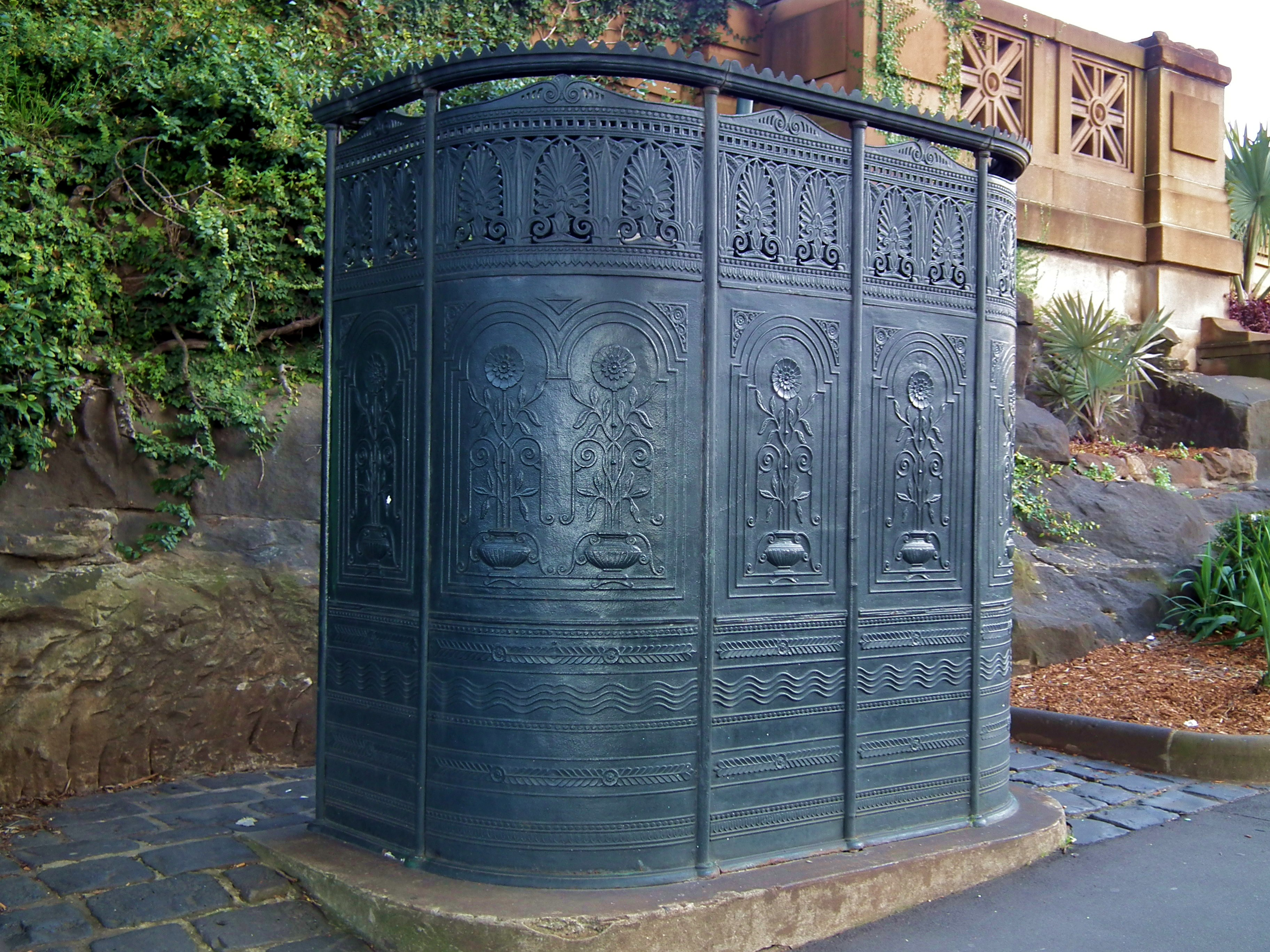
Victorian cast iron urinal in Sydney, Australia (c.1890)

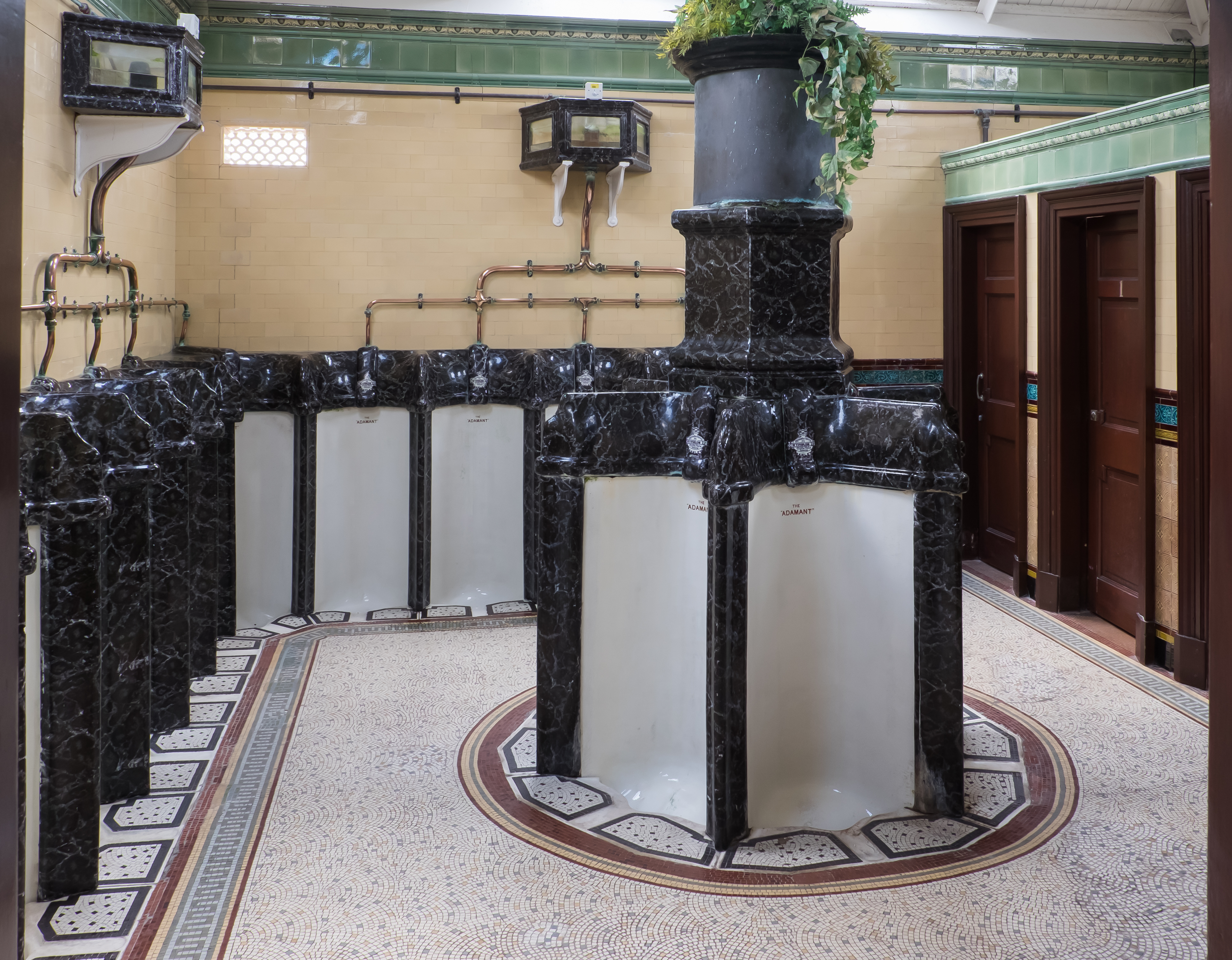
Urinals in the Rothesay Victorian Toilets, Rothesay, Bute (c.1899)

== Society and culture ==
Examples of urinals in popular culture include:

- Marcel Duchamp's Fountain (1917), which some have called the most influential modern artwork, is a urinal which Duchamp signed "R. Mutt".
- Police in Nassau County, New York adopted talking urinals in an anti-drunk driving initiative. Using Wizmark, a talking urinal display screen, police can provide bars with free pre-programmed urinal messages urging patrons not to drink and drive.
- Ernest Hemingway converted a urinal from Sloppy Joe's bar into a water fountain for his cats. The fountain remains a prominent feature at his former home in Key West, Florida, a popular tourist destination in the town.
- Pissoir, retitled Urinal in some countries, was the first feature film directed by John Greyson. It was released in 1980 and takes place in a toilet.
- Gabriel Chevallier's 1934 satirical novel Clochemerle deals with the ramifications of plans to install a new urinal in a French village.
- Indiana Urinalysis (1988) is a documentary on the subject of urinals. Topics include "types of urinals, urinal etiquette, usage of urinal cakes, why urinals are always white, preference of urinal vs. toilet, and urinals for women, as well as a collection of urinal anecdotes." It received a Citation Award from the Indiana Film Society in 1990.
- "Mystery of the Urinal Deuce" is an episode of the American adult animated sitcom South Park, in which the plot revolves around the elementary school's efforts to establish the identity of a person who defecated in a urinal.

=== Gallery of unusual or historical urinals ===
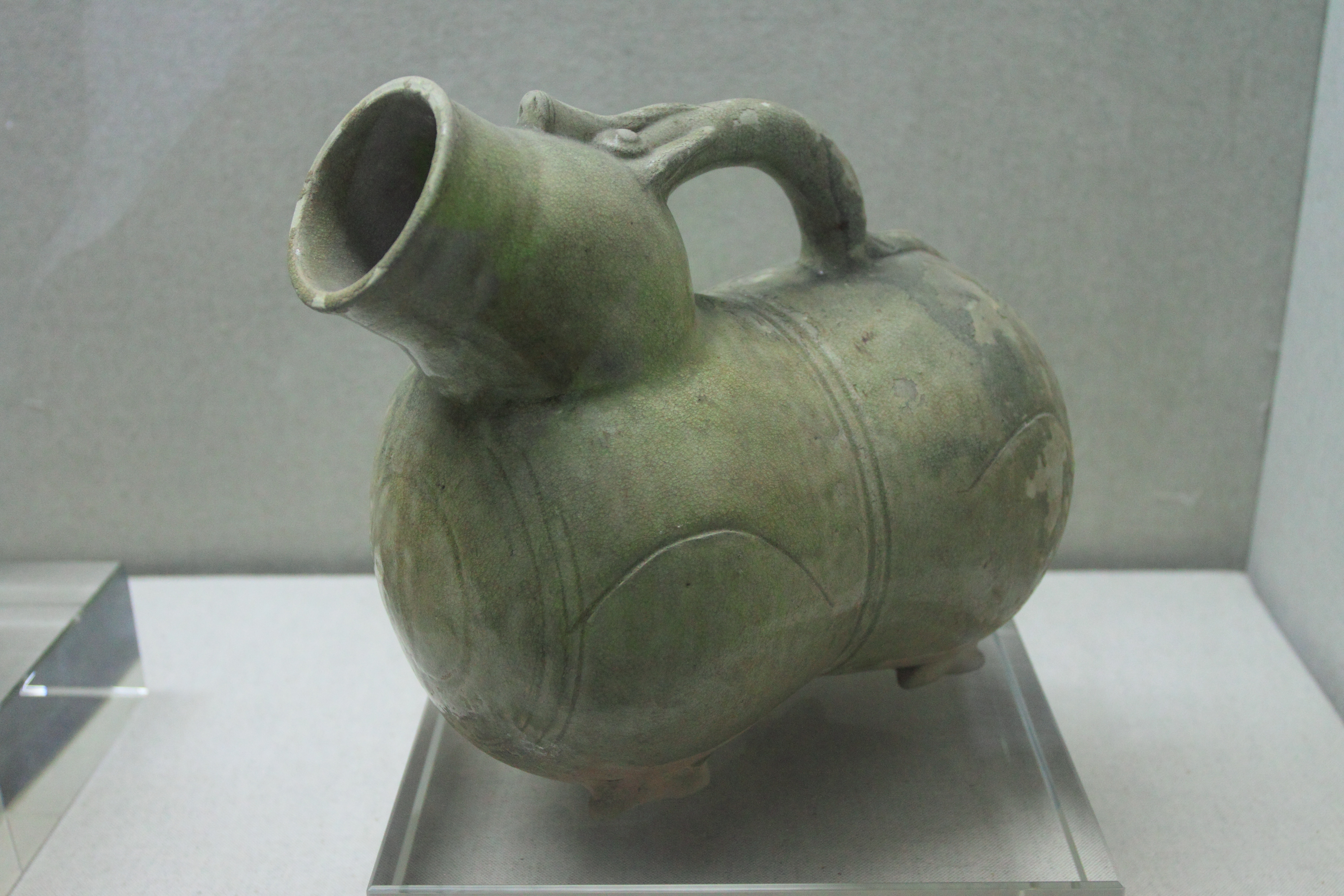
Ancient portable urinal, Western Jin Dynasty (c. 265–316 CE)

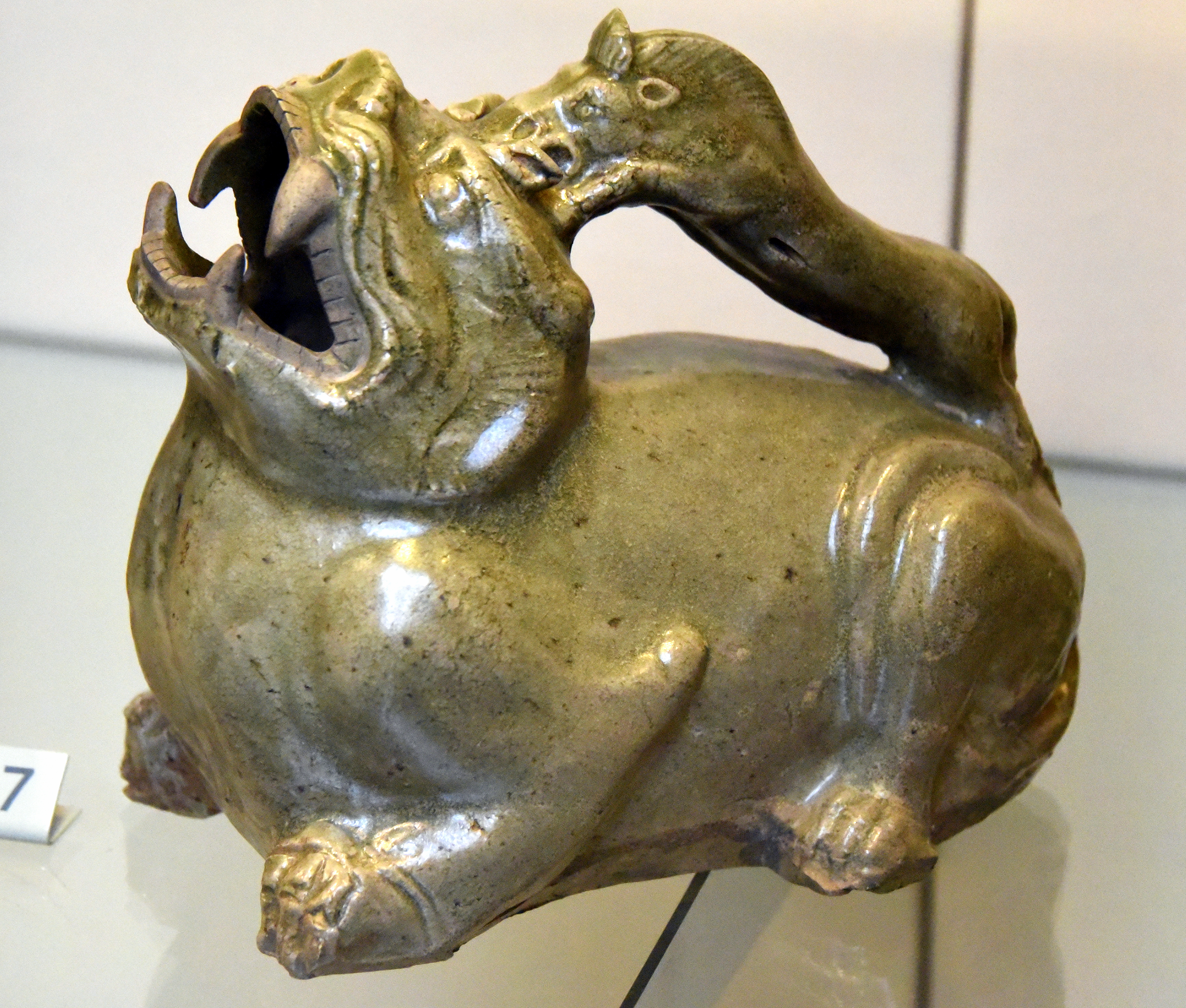
Urinal in the form of a tiger. Stoneware with olive green (celadon) glaze. Southern Dynasties, 500–589 CE. From China, Zhejiang. Victoria and Albert Museum

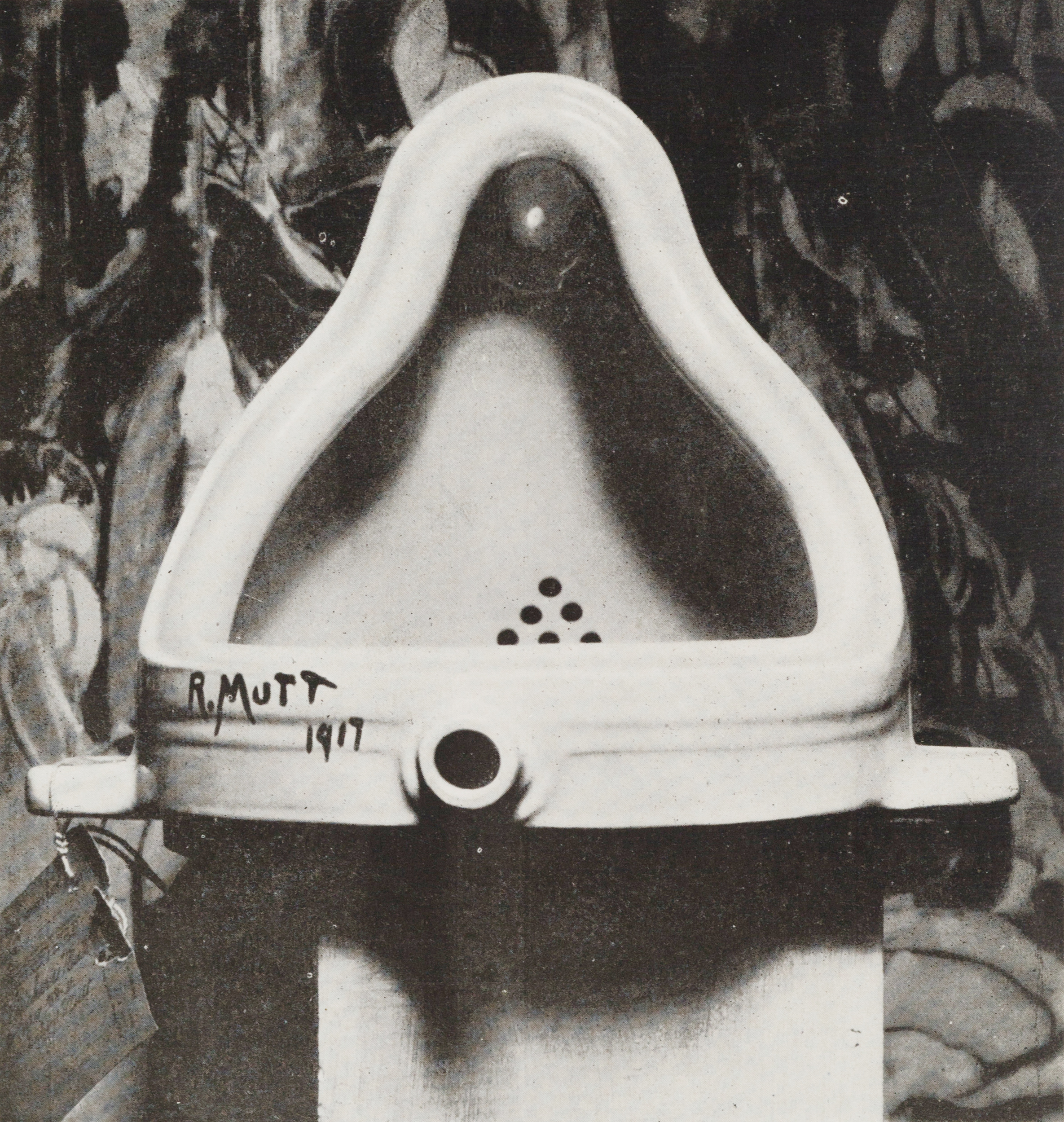
Fountain, a urinal which Marcel Duchamp exhibited as a controversial artwork

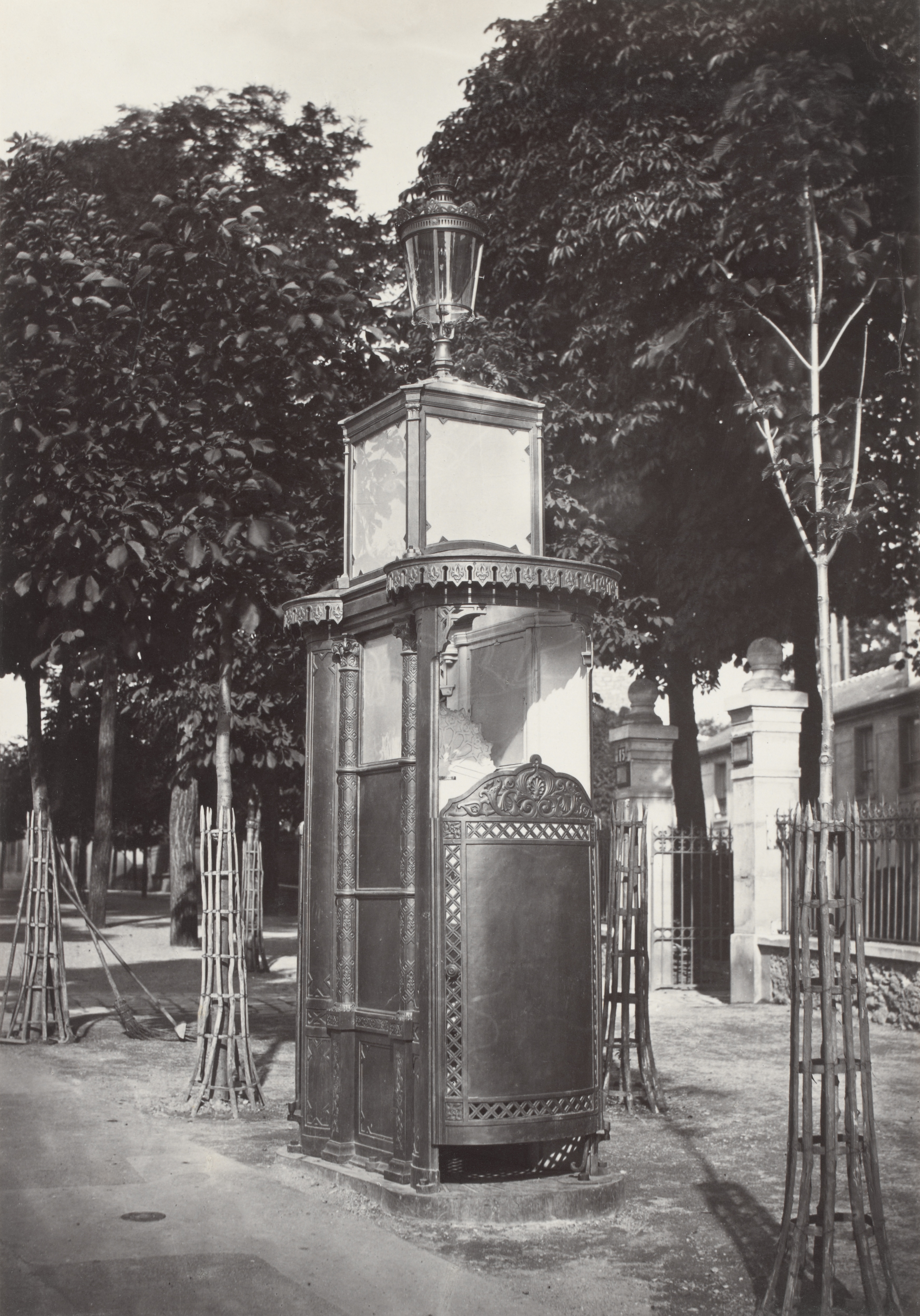
Ornate illuminated French urinal, c.1865

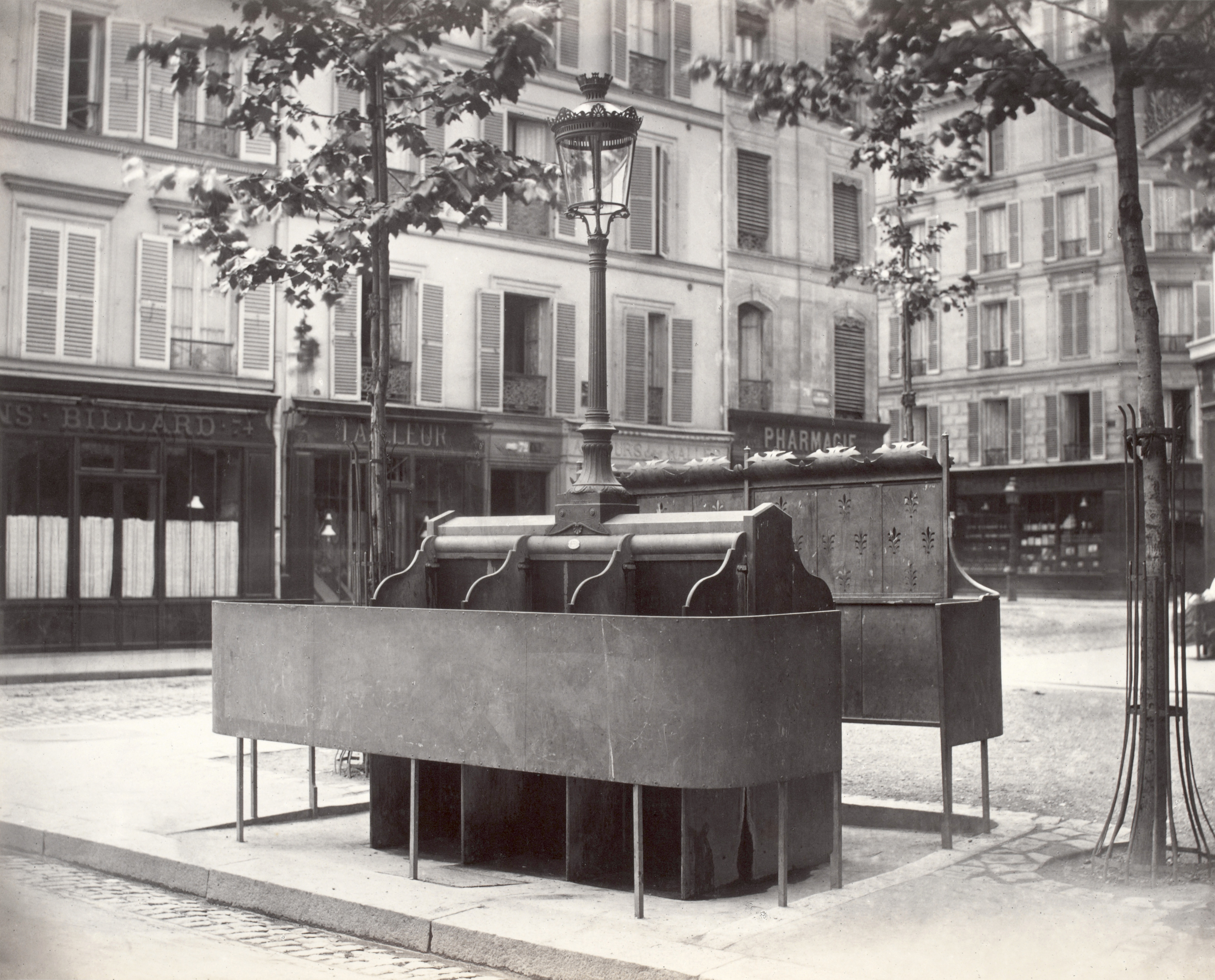
Basic six-stall Paris urinal, c.1865

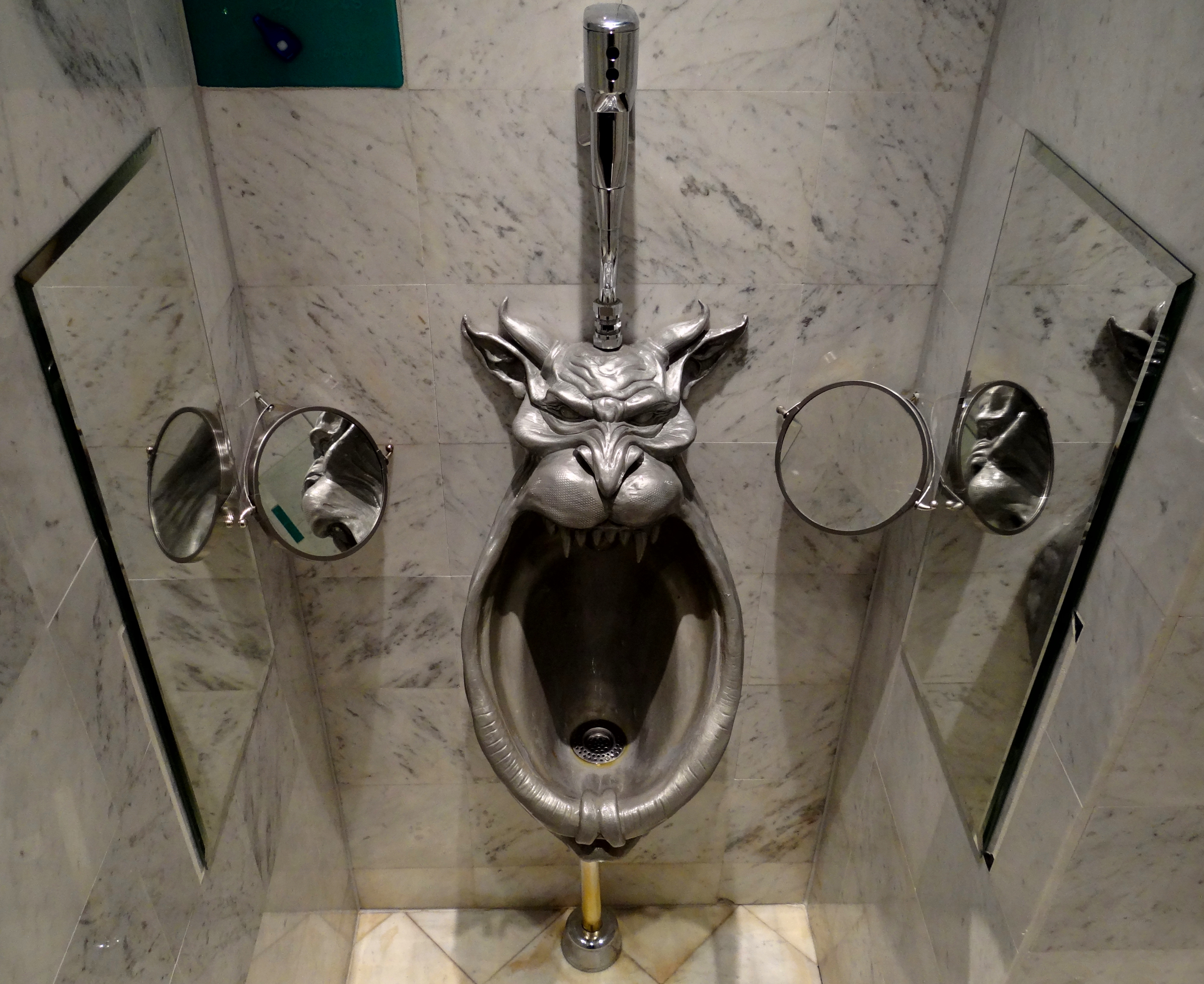
Goth-inspired urinal in Oslo

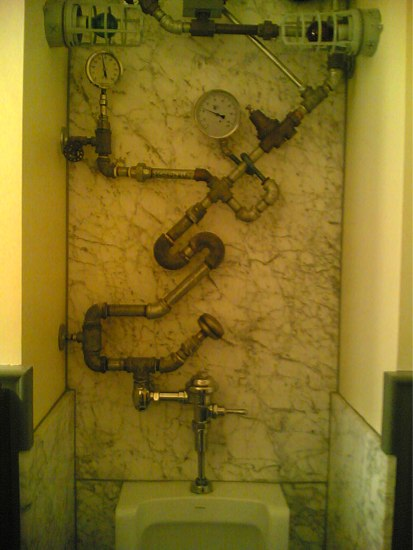
"Steampunk" styled urinal at a bar

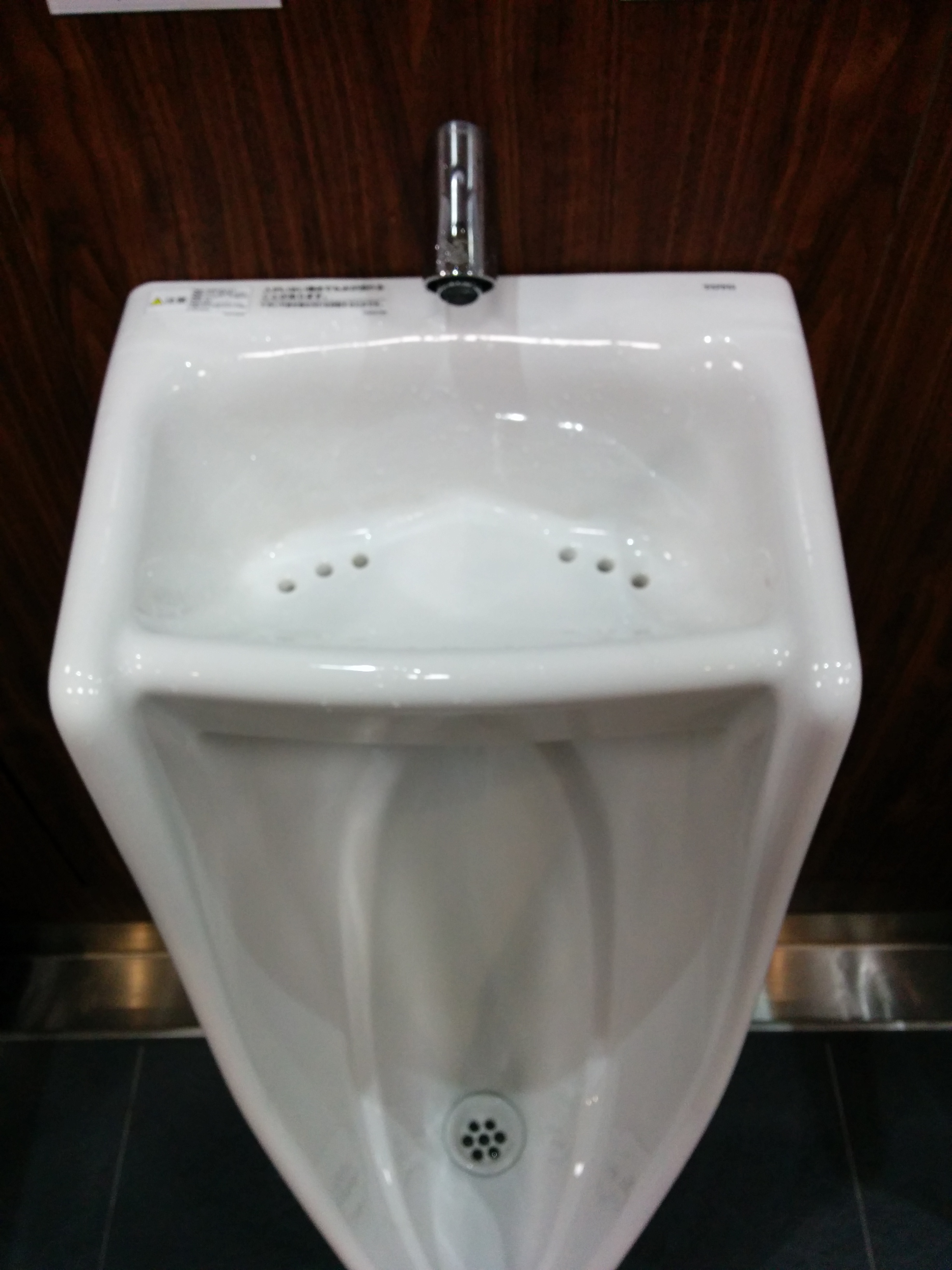
Japanese sink/urinal saves water and physical space

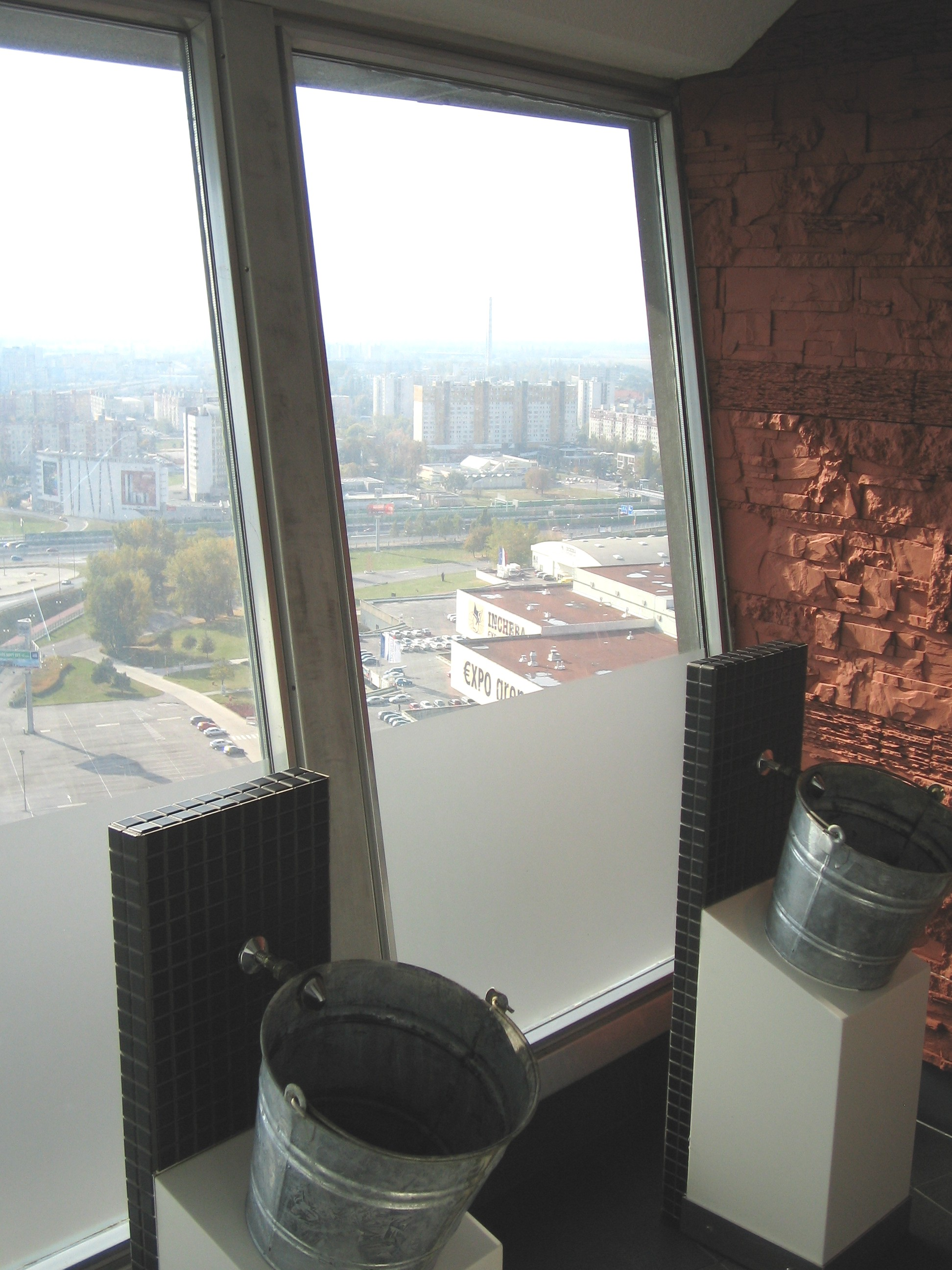
Urinals with a view, at the restaurant UFO in Bratislava

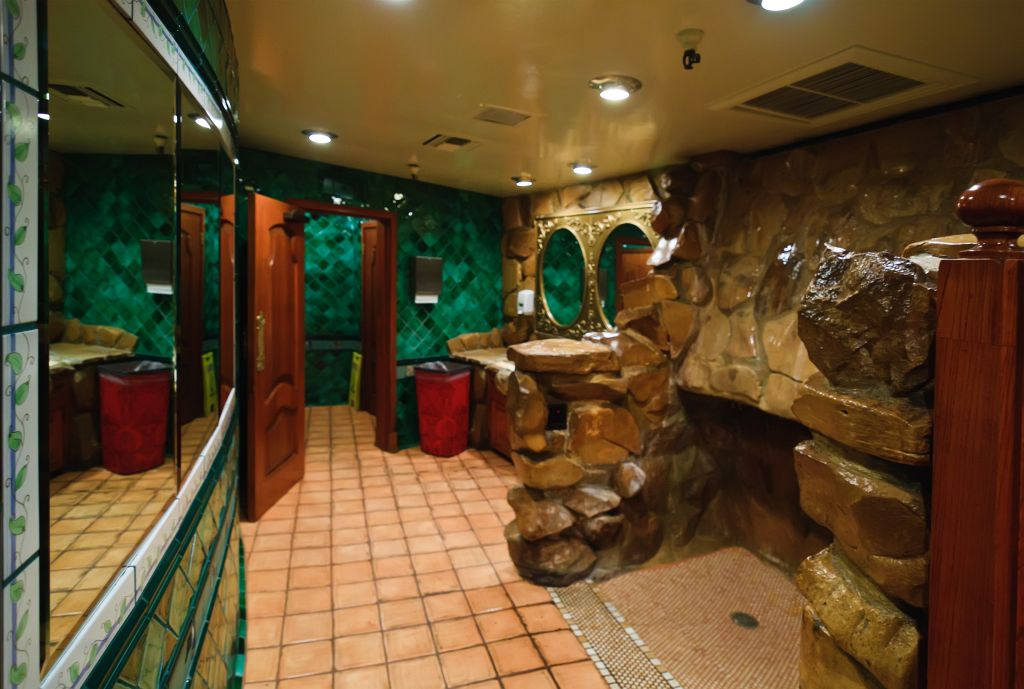
Fancy decorative urinal at Madonna Inn

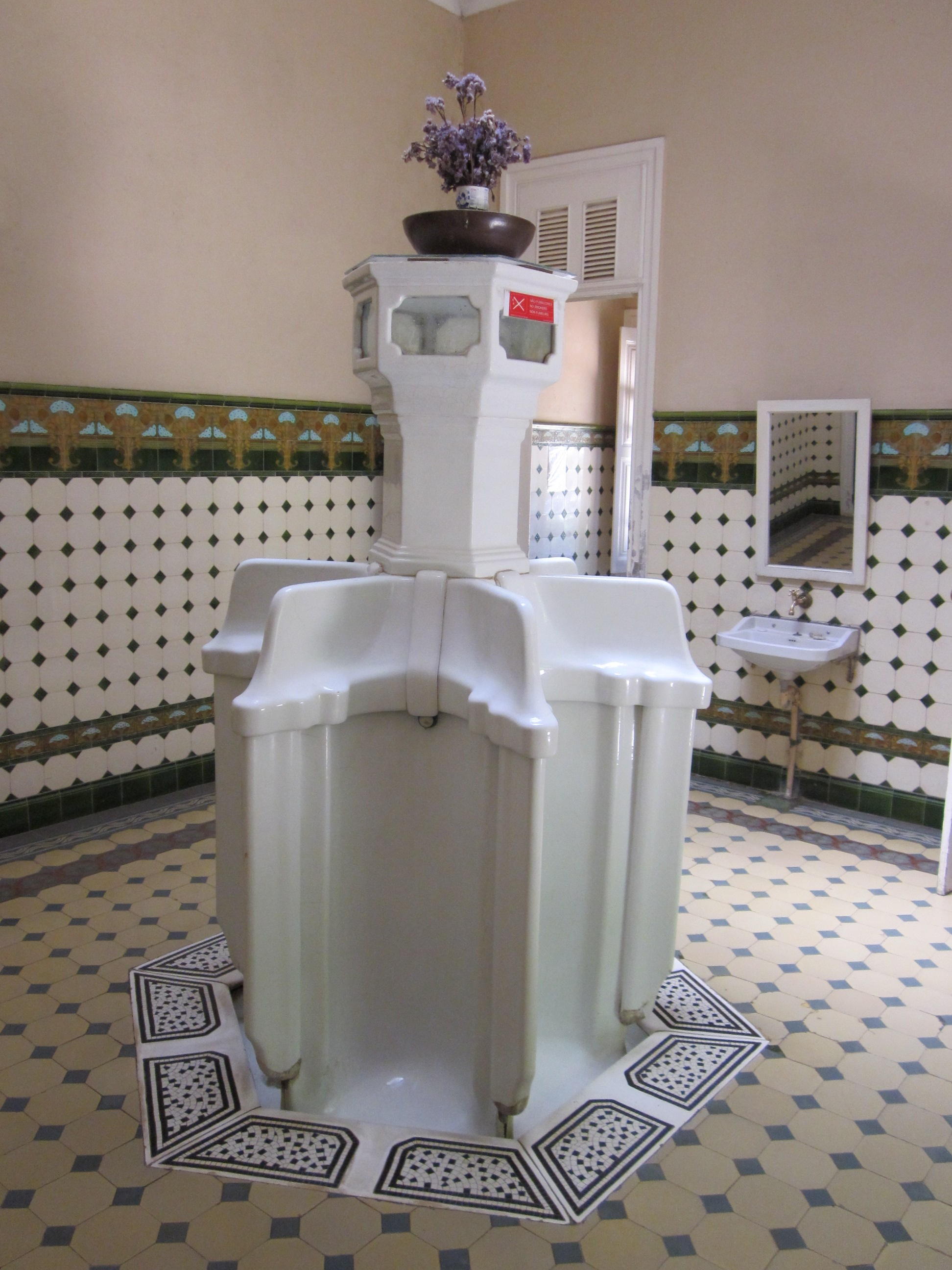
Public urinals in Portugal

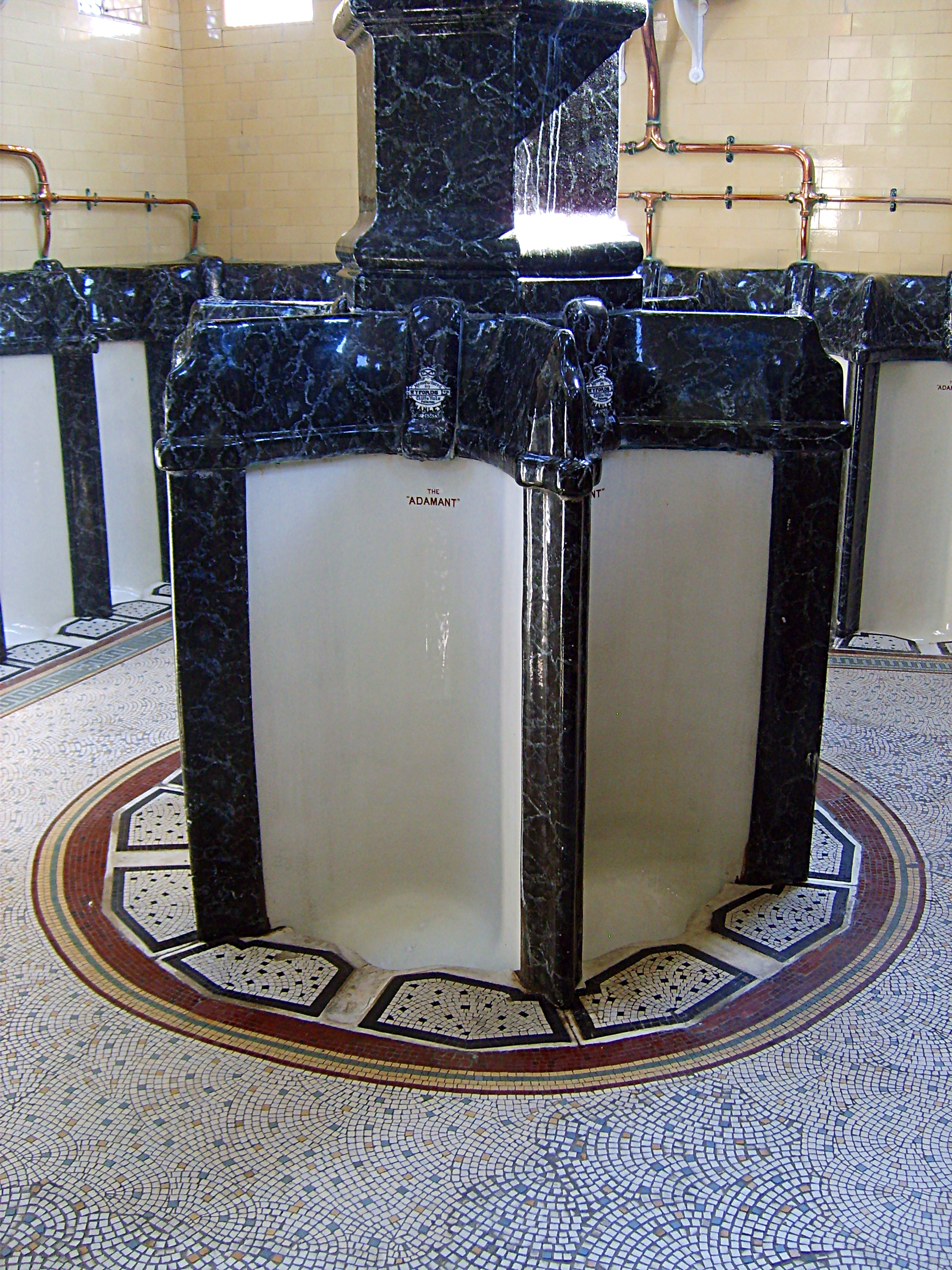
Victorian urinals in Scotland from 1899

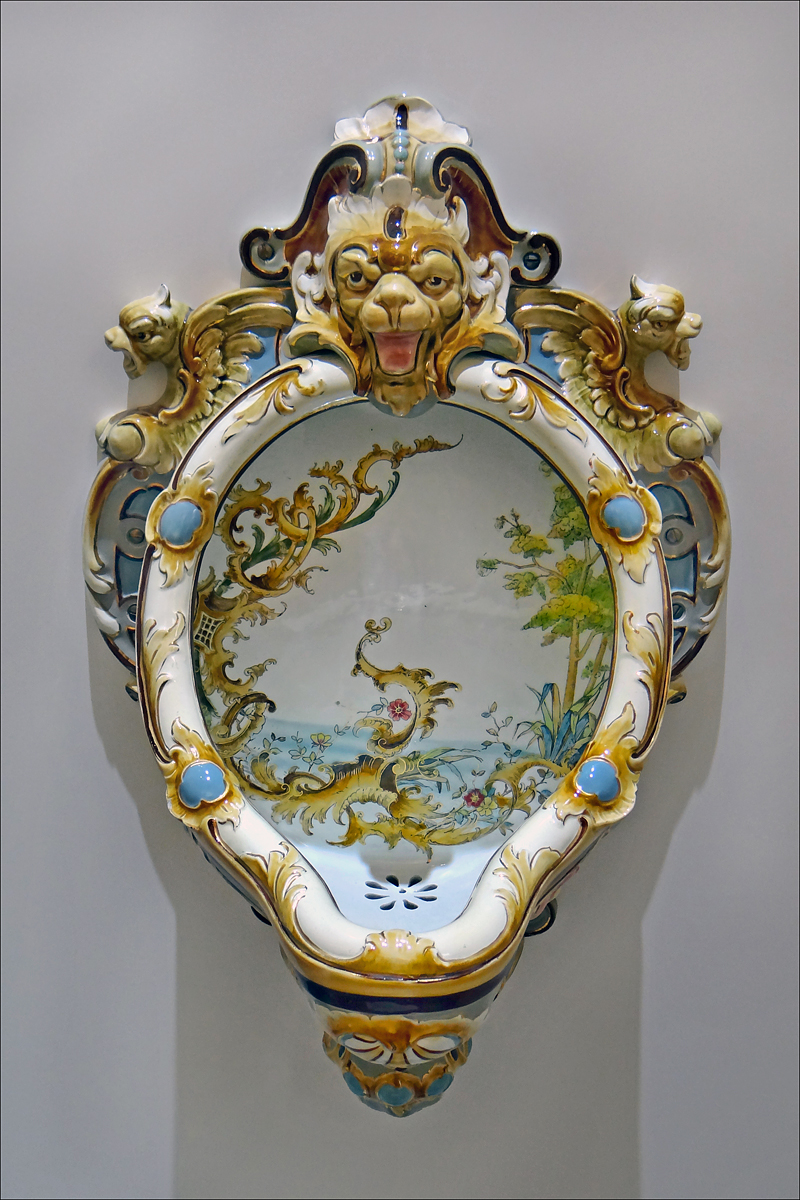
Neo-baroque style decorated urinal

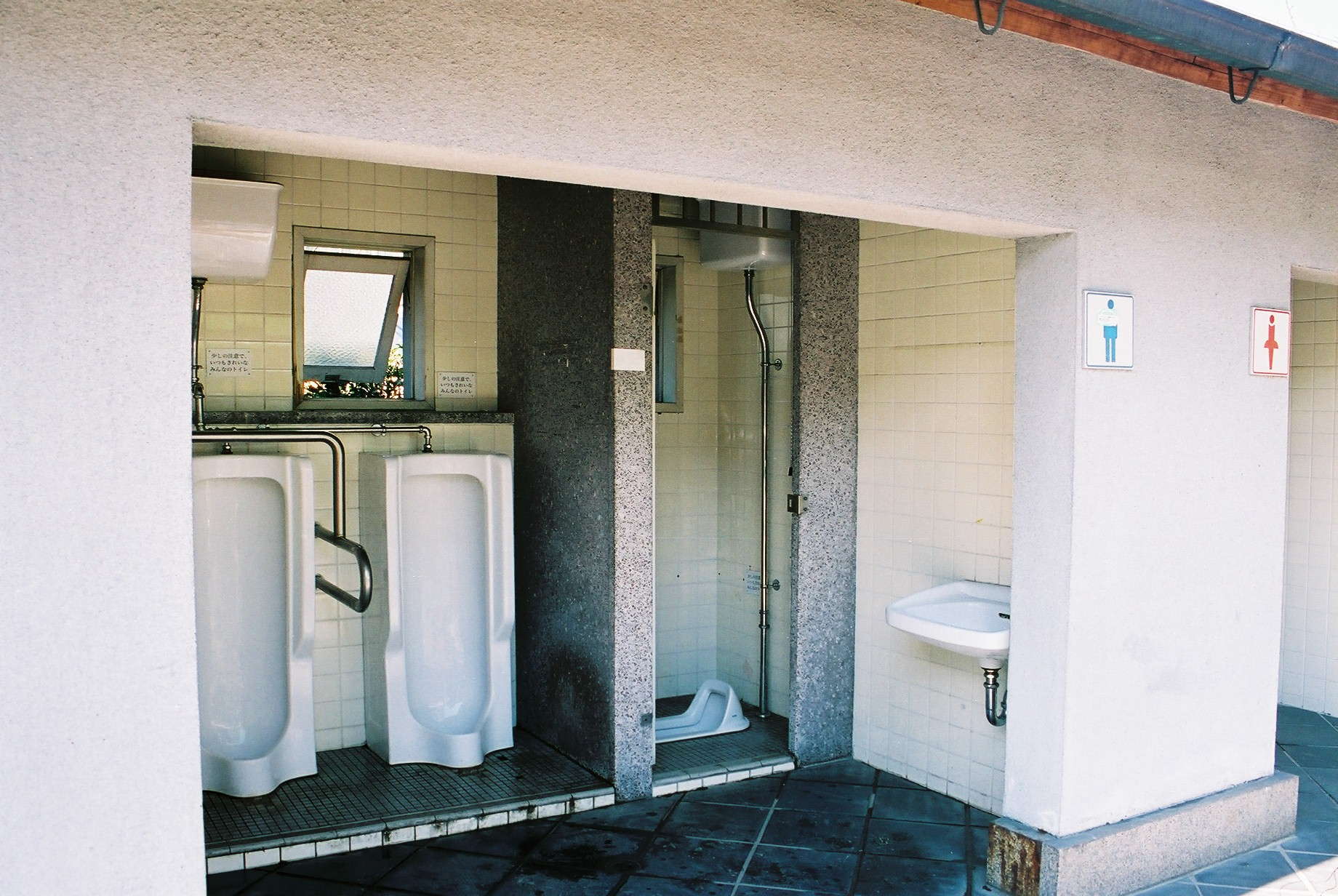
Open plan public toilet in Japan

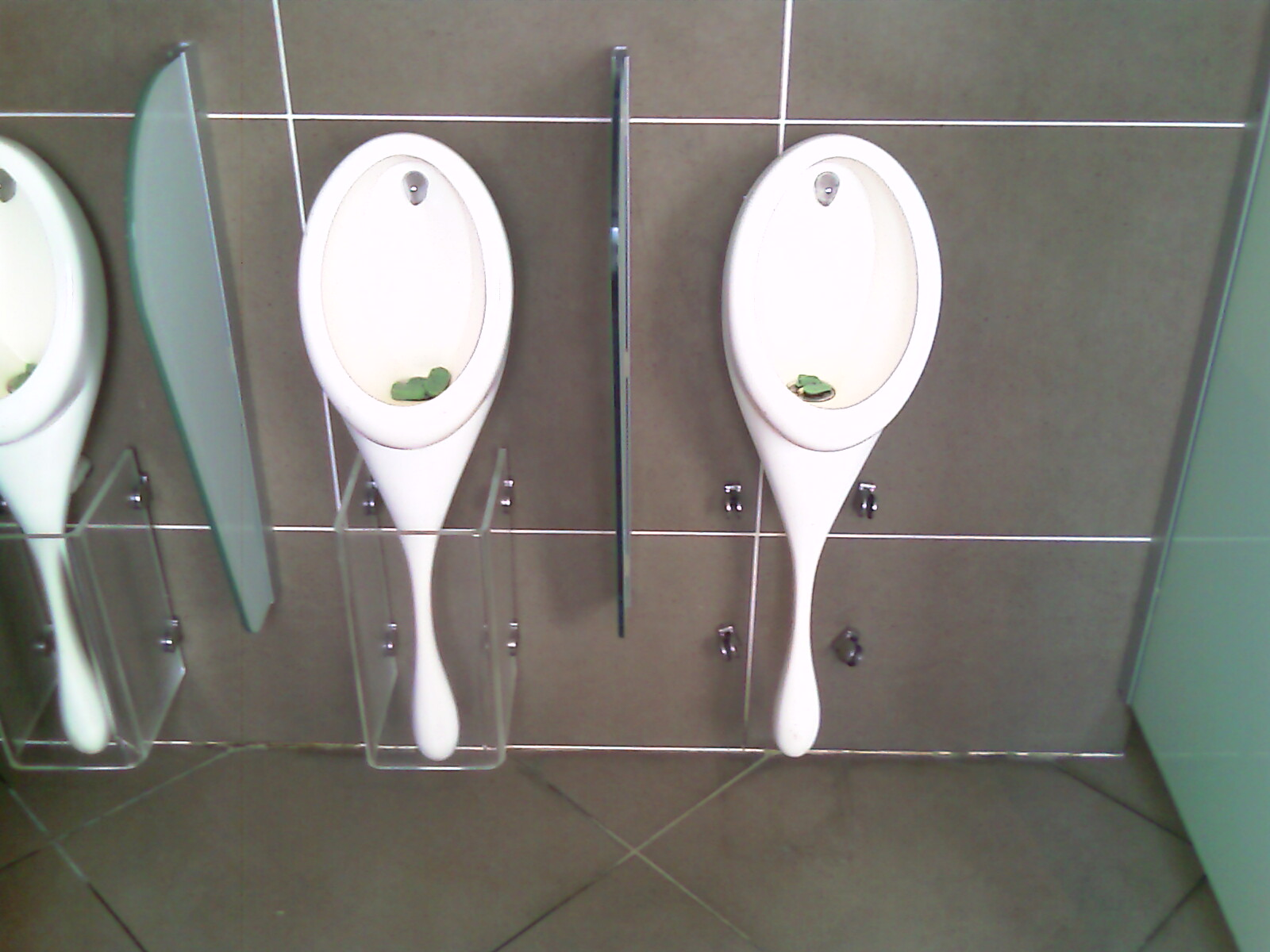
Styled urinals in St. Peter Port, Guernsey

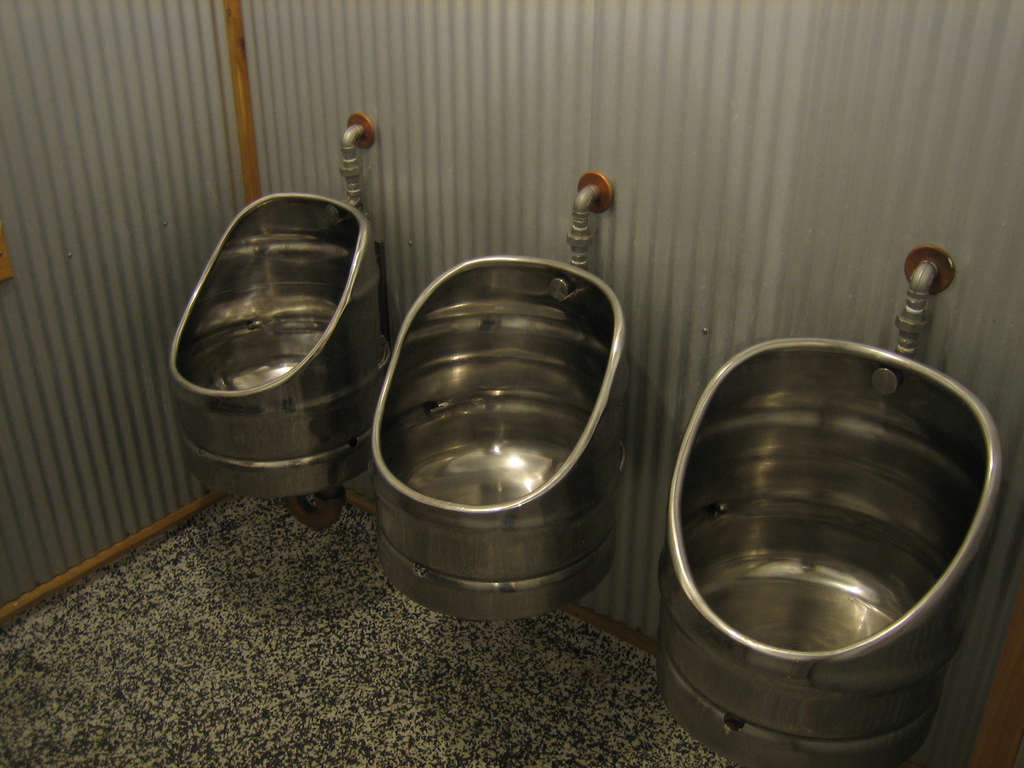
Brewery urinals in Christchurch, New Zealand

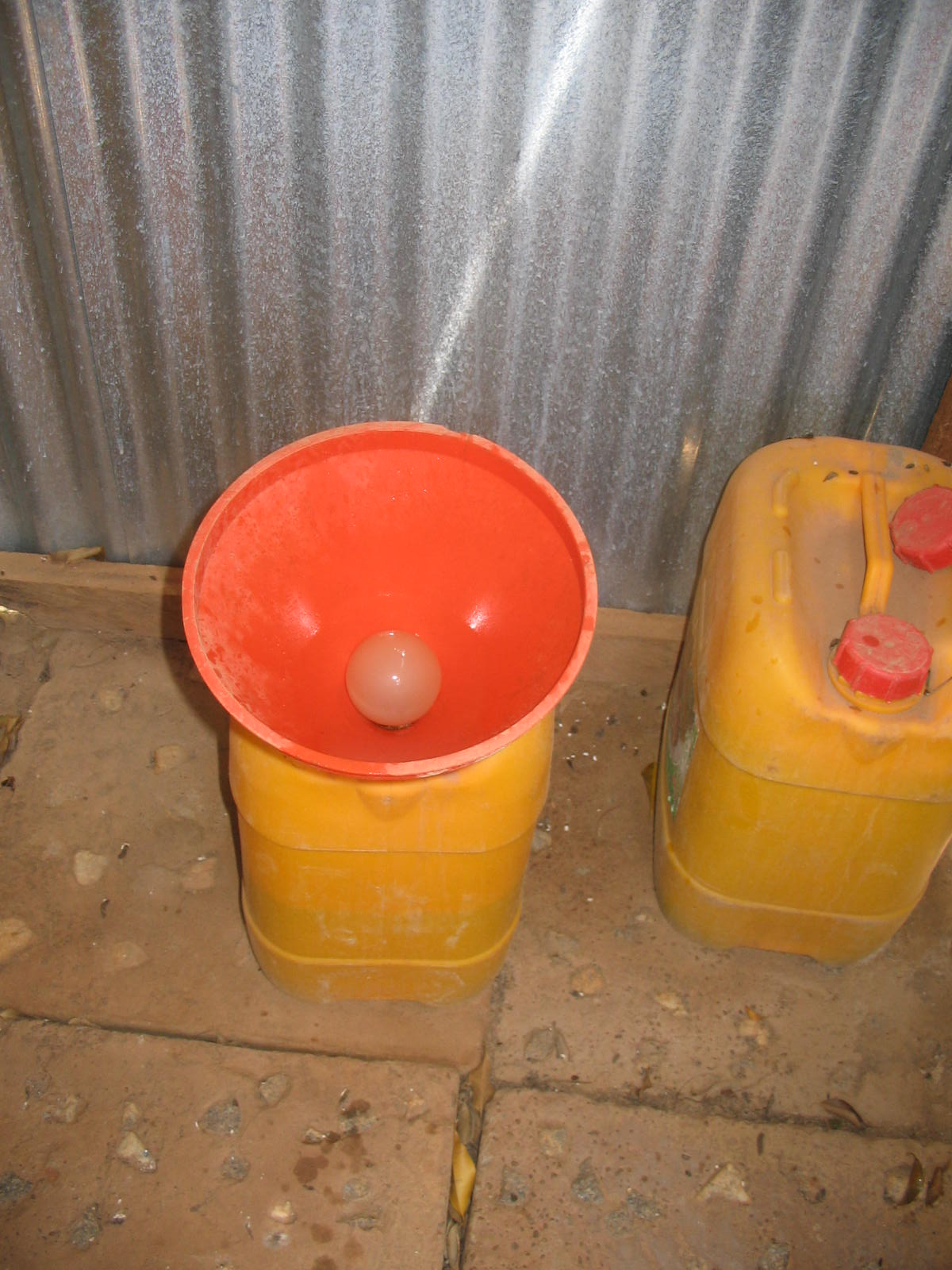
Low-cost waterless portable urinal in Burkina Faso

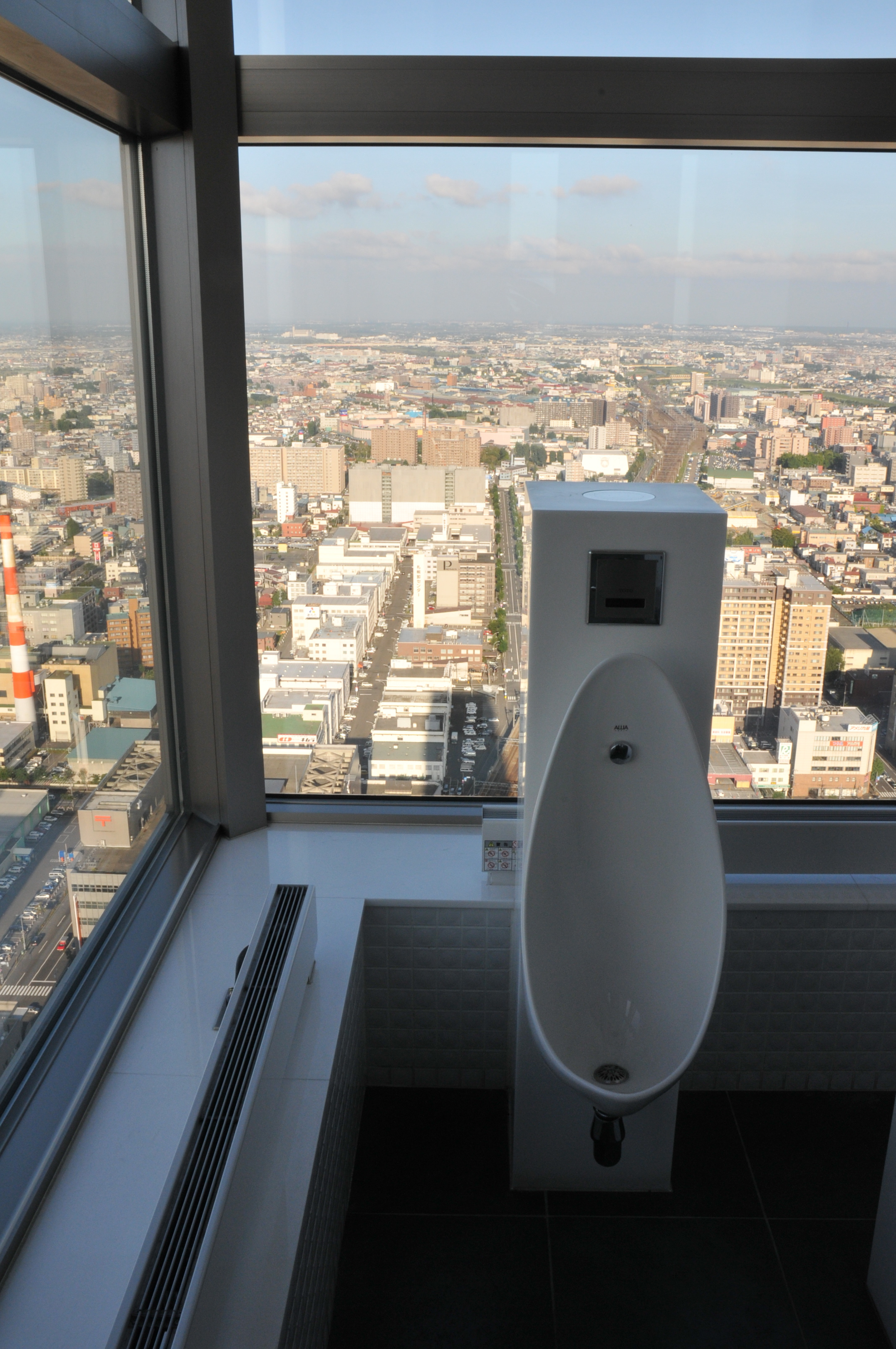
Urinal with a 38th floor view in Hokkaido, Japan

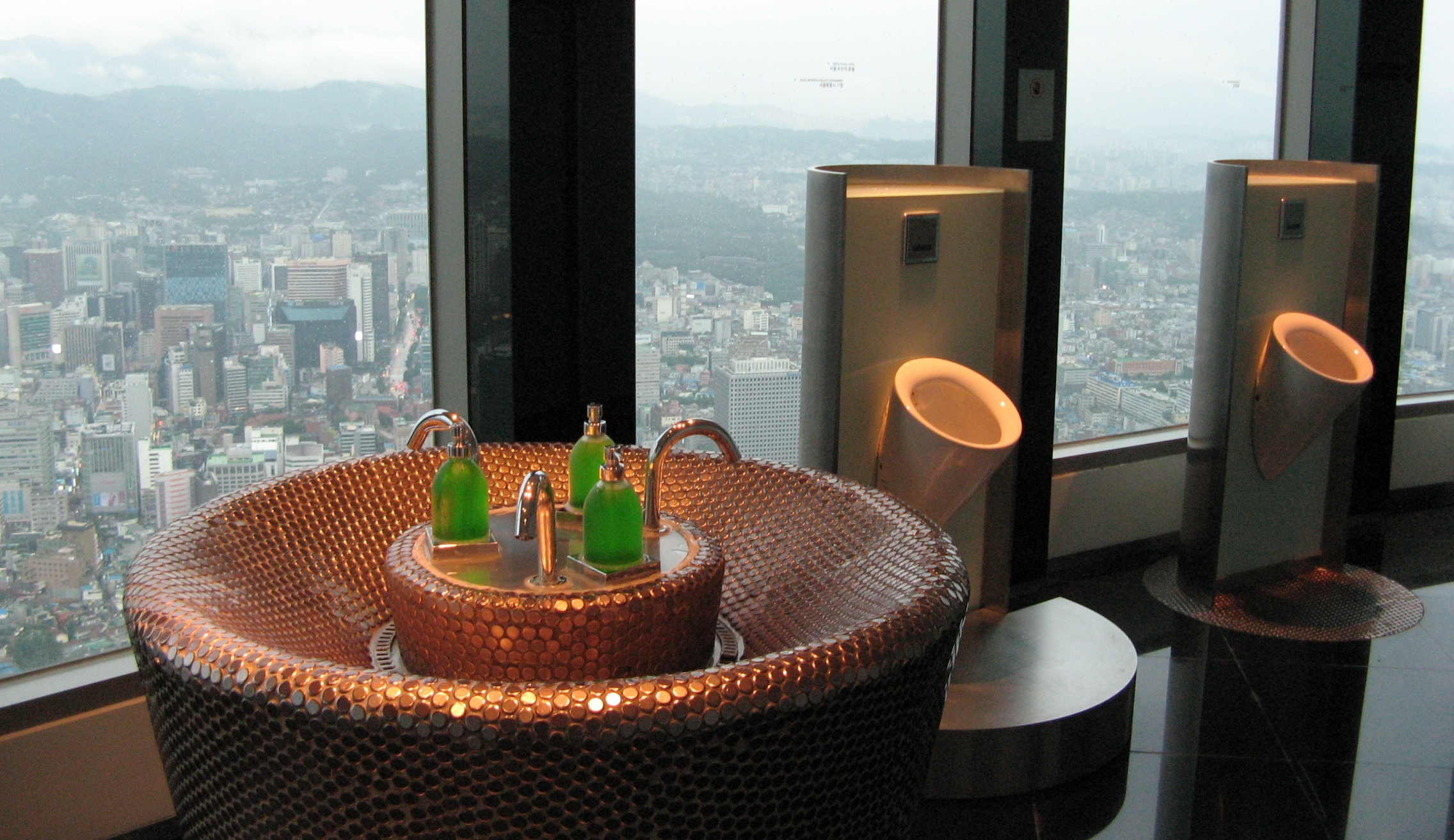
Stand-up urinals in open arrangement

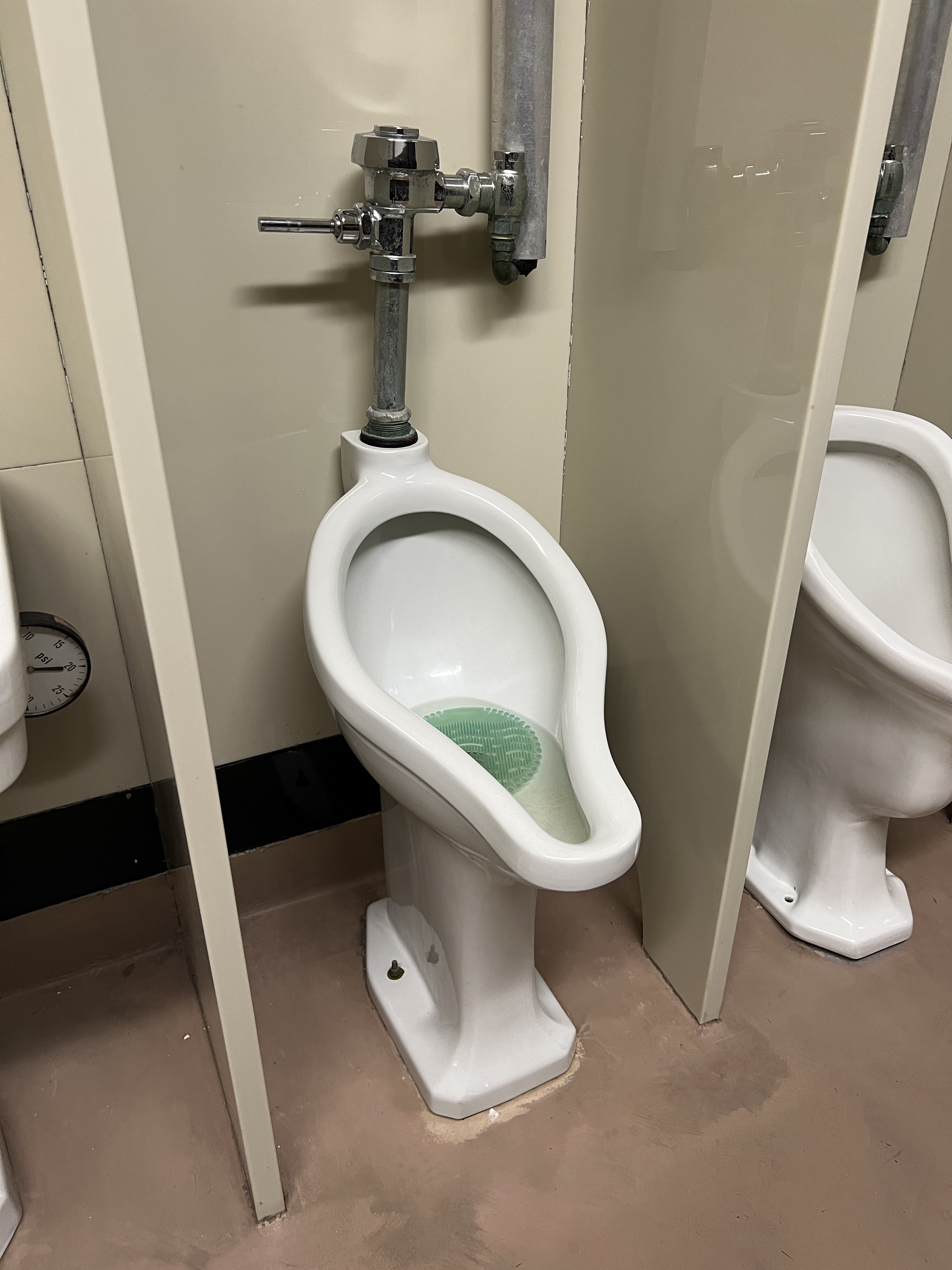
Urinals in a bathroom in the American Museum of Natural History

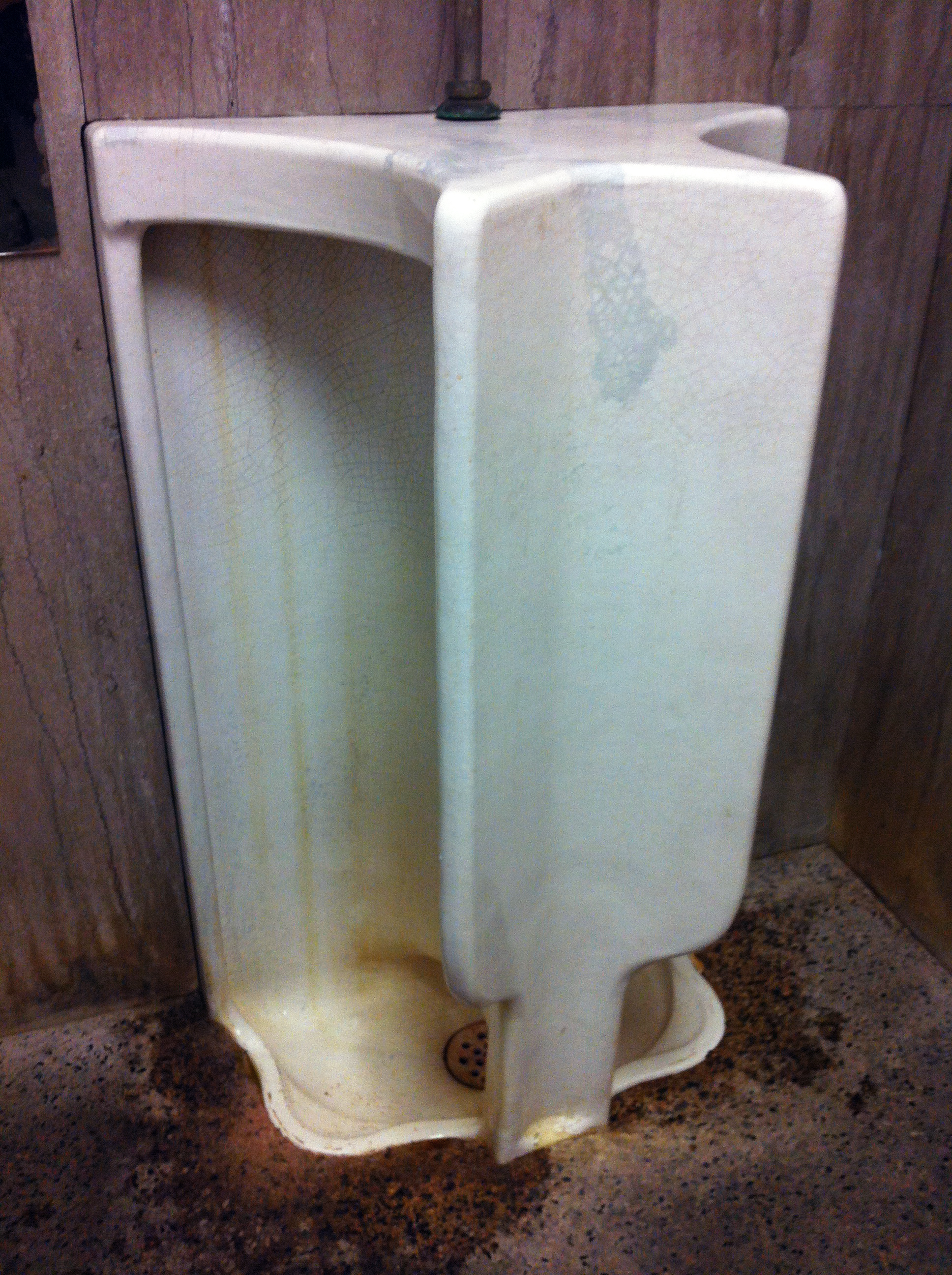
A double urinal. One person can urinate on each side.

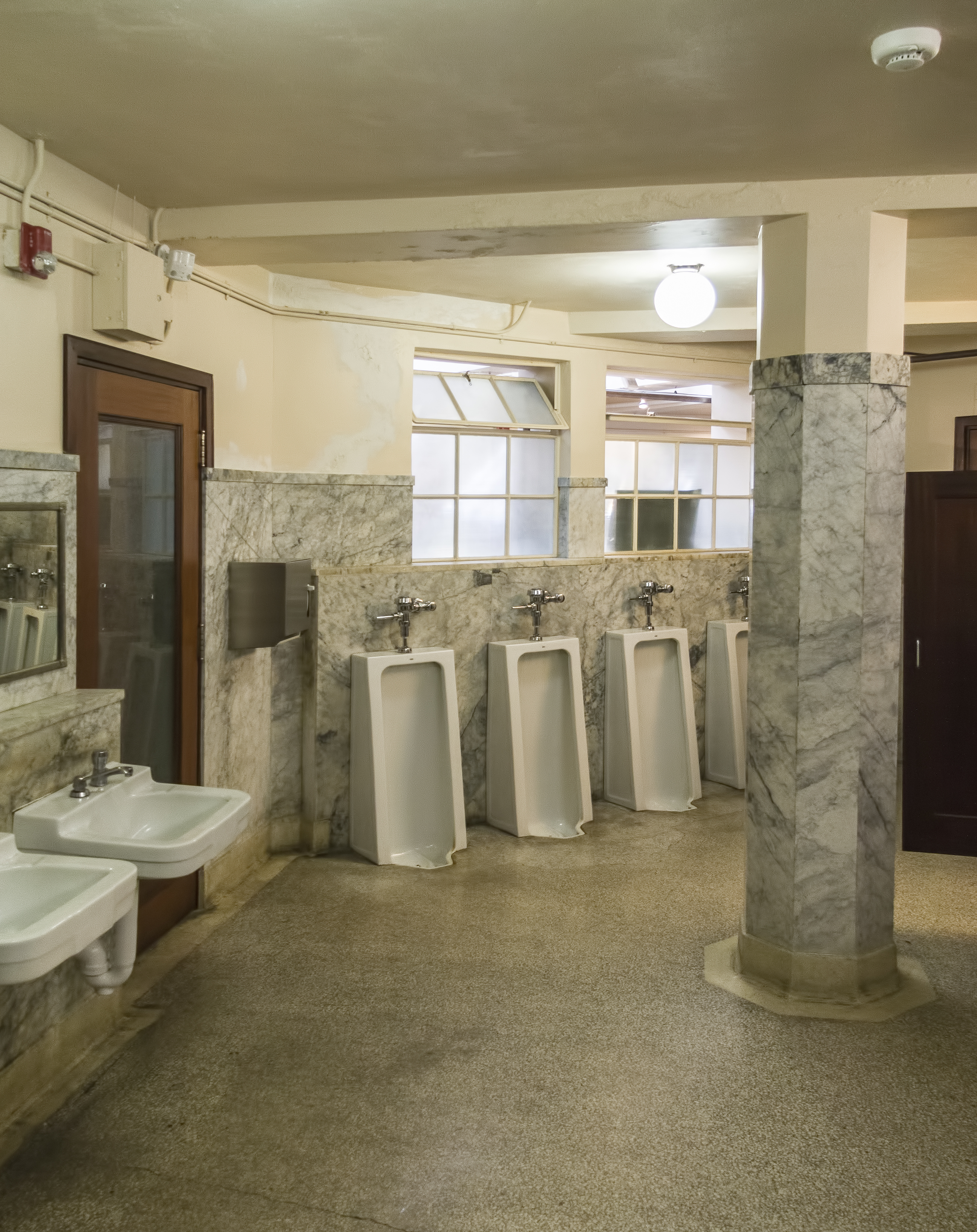
An example of floor standing urinals in a men's bathroom

== See also ==
- Female urinal
- Interactive urinal communicator
- Public toilet
- Reuse of excreta
- Sanistand
- Telescopic urinal
