= Female urinal =

Urinal designed to be used by women and girls

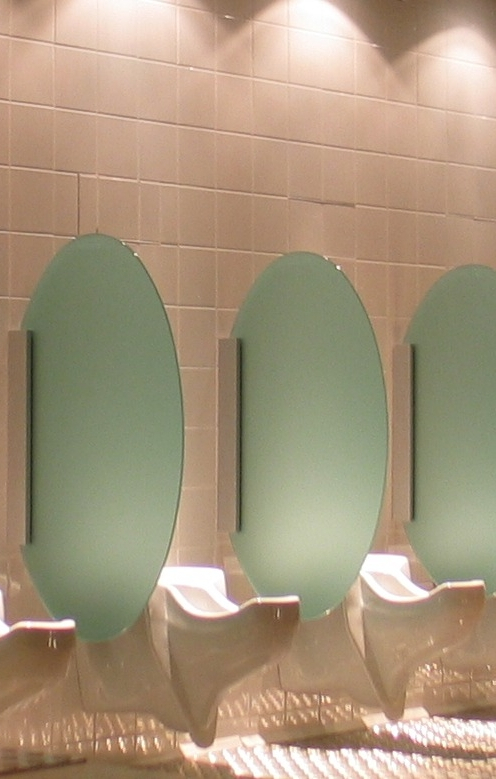
A row of female urinals in Germany separated by privacy partitions, made by GBH Bathroom Products

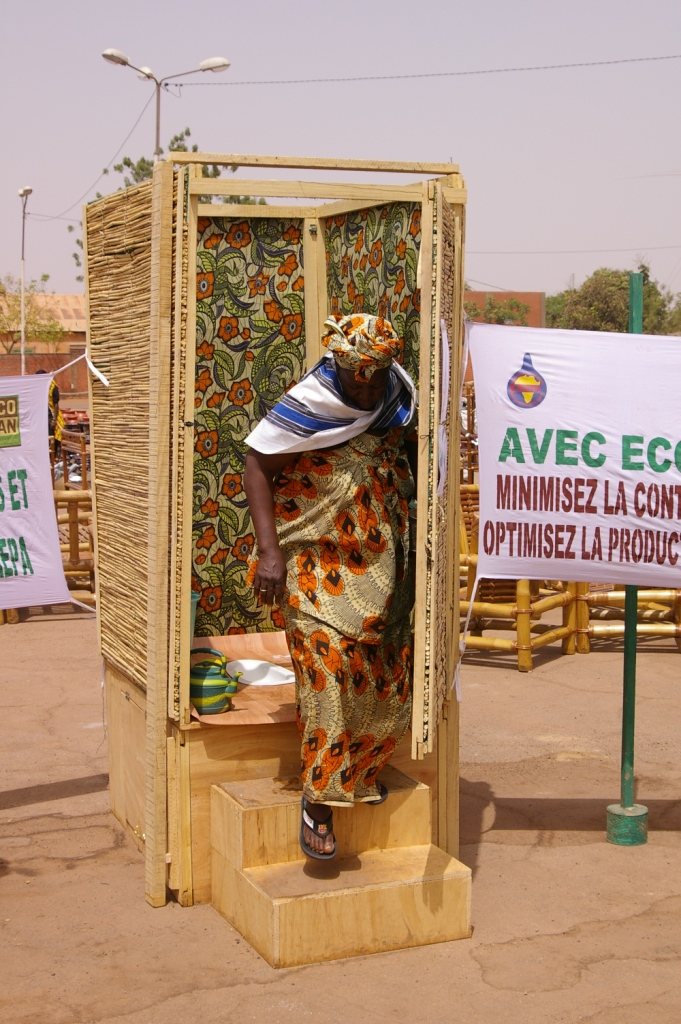
A mobile lightweight female urinal at the Panafrican Film and Television Festival in Ouagadougou, Burkina Faso

A female urinal is a urinal designed for the female anatomy to allow for ease of use by women and girls. Different models enable urination in standing, semi-squatting, or squatting postures, but usually without direct bodily contact with the toilet. Sitting models also exist, and are designed for body contact with the urinal.

Unisex urinals are also marketed by various companies, and can be used by both sexes. Female and unisex urinals are much less common than male urinals. Moreover, male urinals are more abundant in men's or boys' public toilets than in the toilets of private homes.

== Background ==
=== Advantages compared to toilets for urination ===
Urinals for female users could potentially have some of the same advantages as urinals for male users, when compared to toilets (solely with regard to urination):

- lower cost
- simpler maintenance
- smaller space requirements (several wall-mounted urinals may be installed on the floor space of a single toilet cubicle)
- reduced water consumption for flushing compared to sit toilets (waterless urinals can even function without any flushing water)
- more hygienic, contact-free urination process (no risk of contact with feces from previous users)
- no urine on toilet seat from women who avoid contact
- faster use
- potential for easier recycling of nutrients as fertilizer

Due to an increased number of units in the same amount of floor space, there is usually a faster and shorter queue for public urinals; up to 30% more people can use the toilet facilities at the same time.

Female urinals could possibly be suitable for use in public toilets which are heavily used during peak hours and which are likely to attract large numbers of visitors, especially places like theaters, stadiums, schools, universities, discotheques, shopping centers, and public transit facilities. In addition, temporary mobile female urinals have been developed for use at open-air events and festivals, as well as free-standing units for public spaces.

== Design and implementation ==
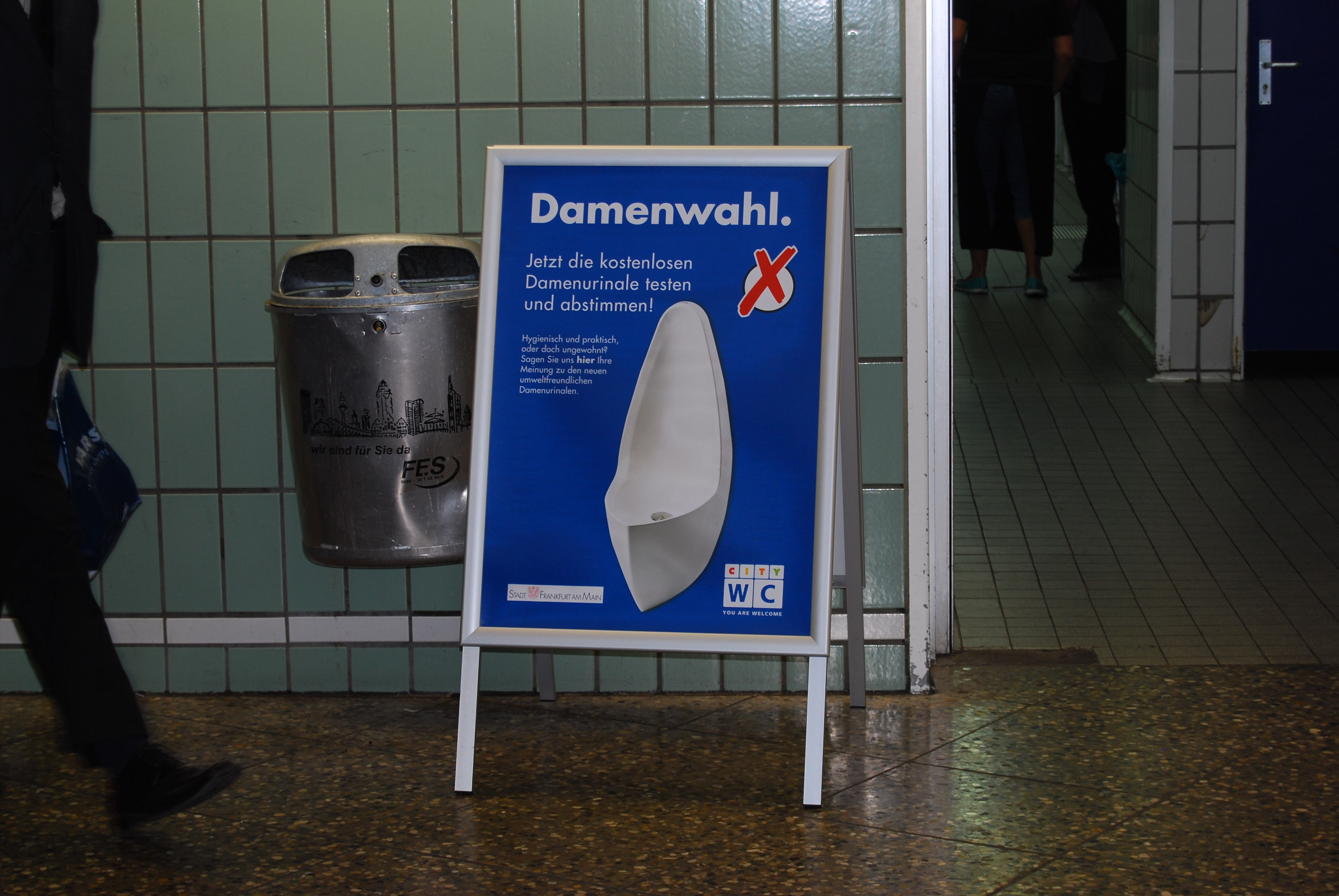
Announcement of women's urinals in front of a public toilet in Frankfurt, Germany

Urinals are being developed that can be used by both sexes. While urinals for men and boys can be found almost everywhere in public toilets, unisex and female urinals are still niche products. Many people feel that this is satisfactory because of anatomical differences that make use of a urinal more convenient for the male population than it would be for the female population. According to Mete Demiriz, a professor of sanitary technology at the Westphalian University of Applied Sciences in Gelsenkirchen, economic considerations and social conventions also prevent the wider installation of female urinals in public toilets.

The female urinal models offered today are conceptually similar to each other and follow the shape and design of male urinals but are more closely tailored to the female anatomy. One difference is most women choose to stand with their back toward the urinal and adopt a half-squatting position, which is also sometimes called the "skier's posture" or "hovering stance". This is based on the posture that women generally adopt in conventional public toilets if they are dirty and when physical contact is not desired, but hovering may leave urine behind in the bladder and may not be good for the pelvic floor muscles. Thus some people hover only in cases of dire necessity.

In countries where squat toilets are the norm, female urinals can also be found as a ceramic pan at floor level. This kind of urinal would be used in a full squat position to avoid splashing back of urine. In the past, models that were used in a full squat (similar to Asian squat-style toilets) have been developed to the prototype stage or brought to the market, like the "Peeandgo" by Chen-Karlsson, but those did not achieve commercial success. As of 2017, all female urinals available on the western market were wall-mounted and used in a half-squat, "skiing" position.

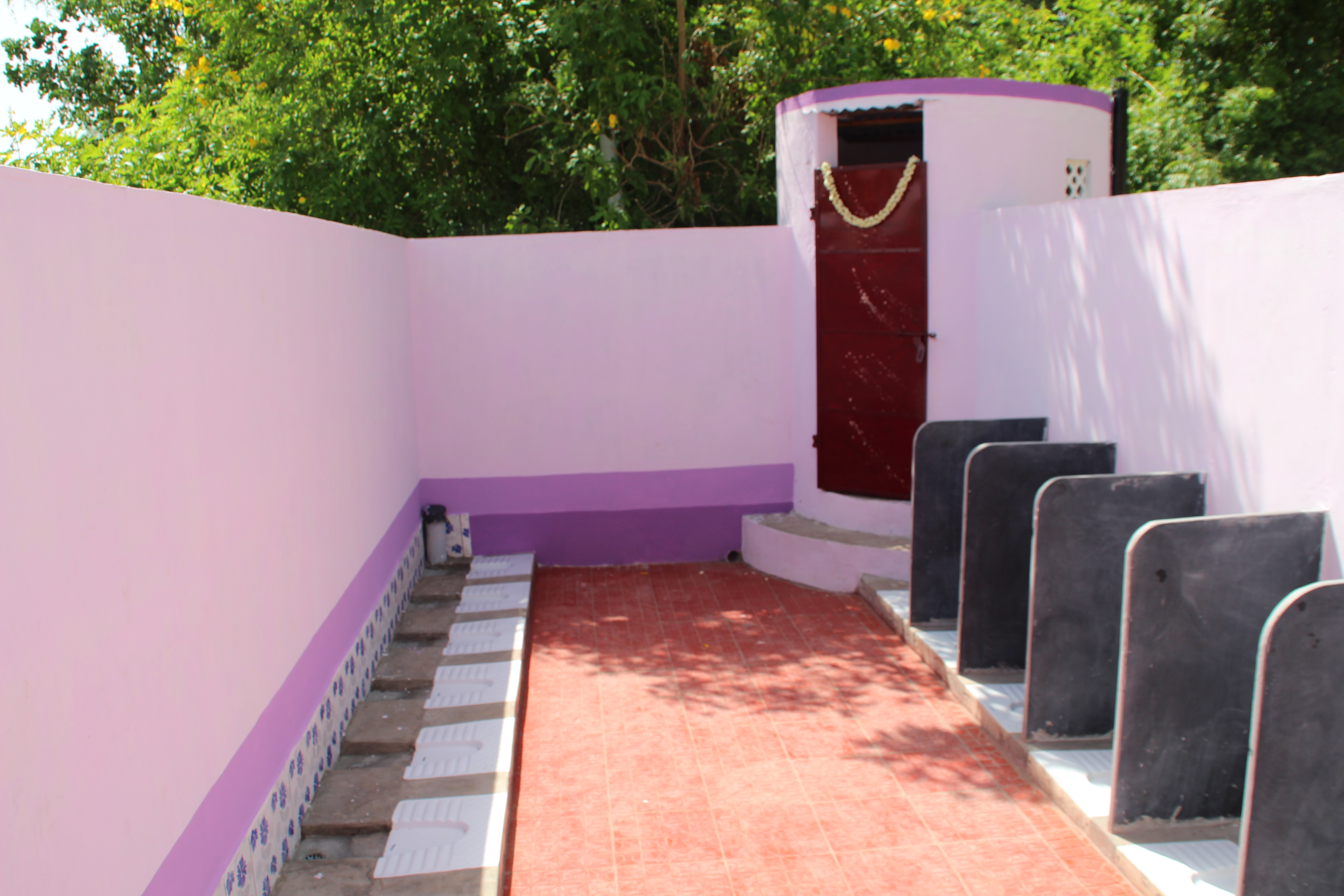
Squatting urinals (in the ground) for female students at Government Middle School in Peramathur, Cuddalore District, Tamil Nadu, India. The urinals on the right side have privacy partitions and are used by older girls.

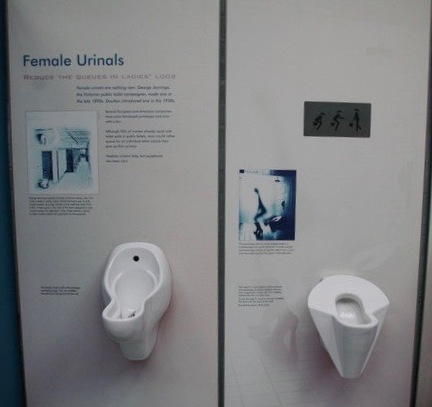
Two different designs of wall-mounted female urinals at an exhibition

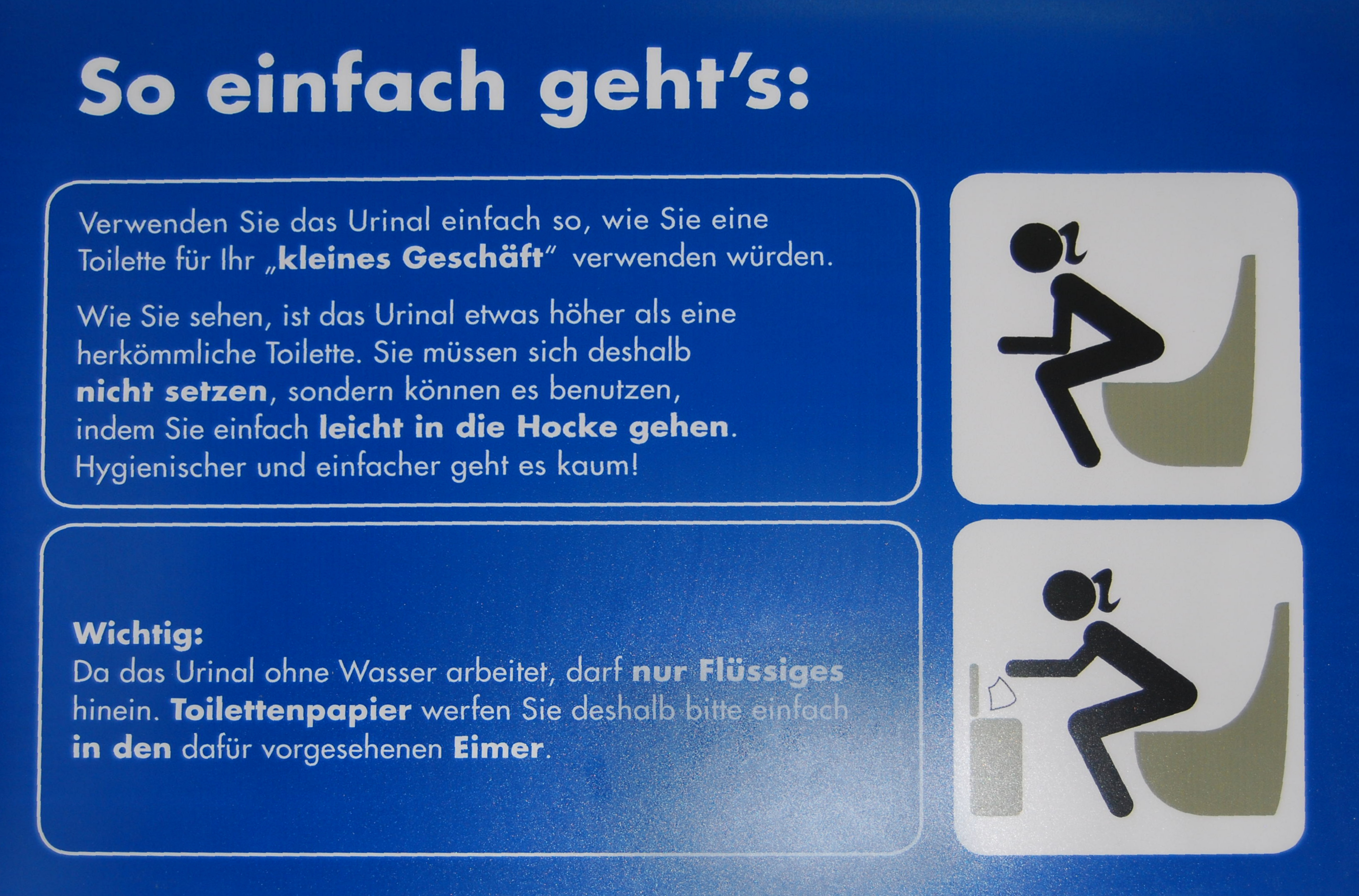
Graphical instructions on how to use a female urinal in a public restroom (Frankfurt, Germany)

=== Locations ===
==== Female and unisex urinals in public toilets ====
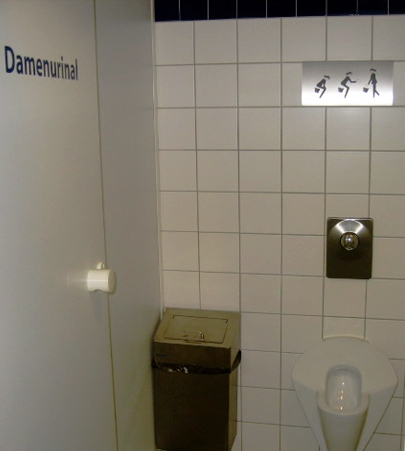
Women's urinal: "Lady P" at the Dortmund Airport, Germany

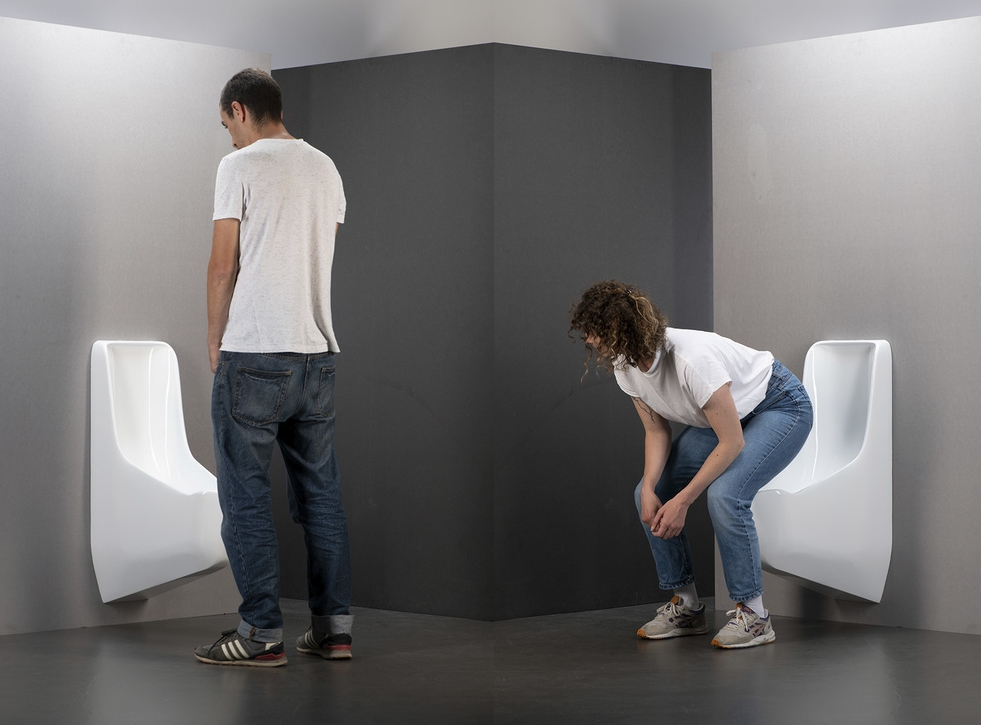
The Urin*all unisex urinal, which can be used by men and women, is used by women in a hovering position

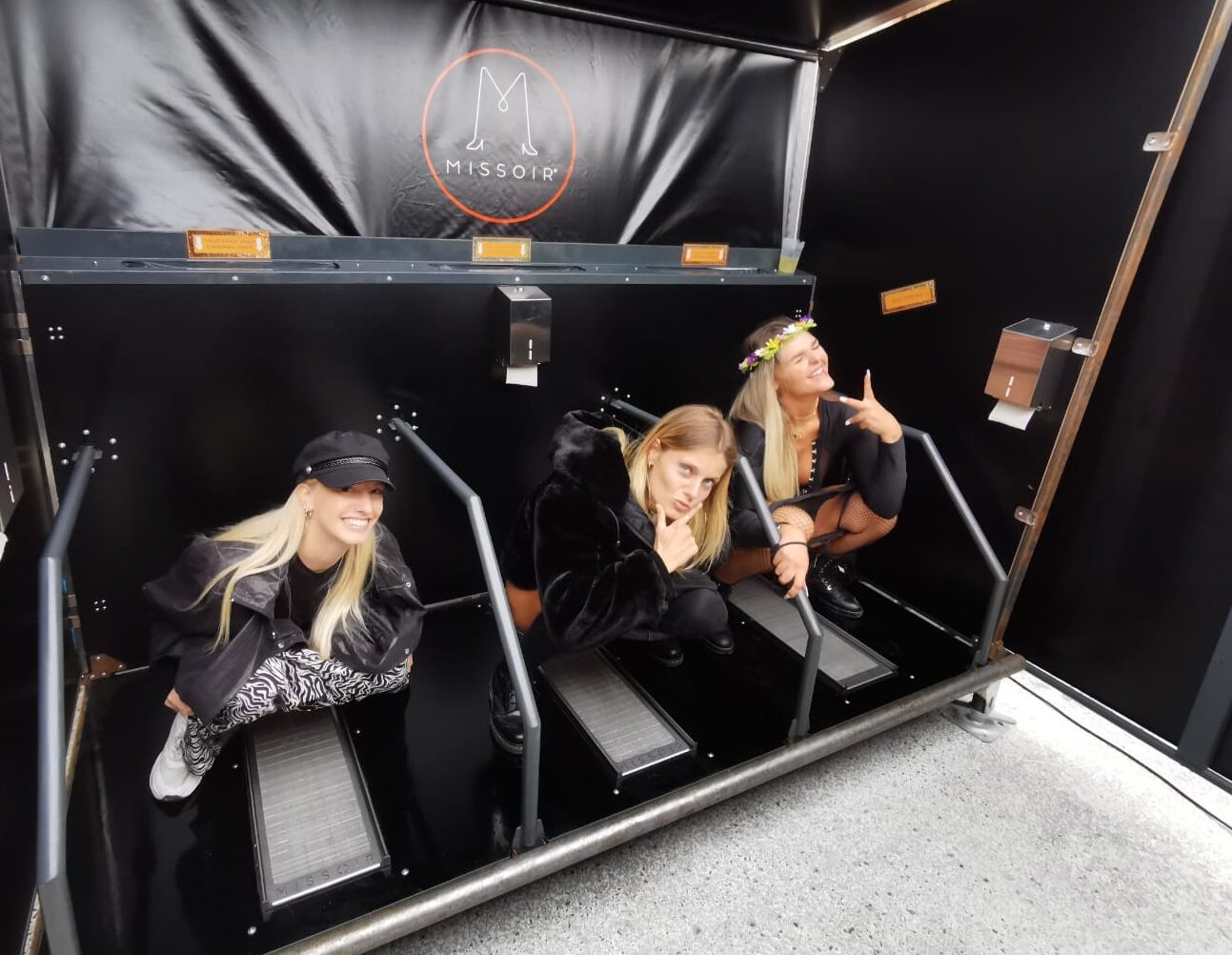
The Missoir female urinal is used in a full squat position

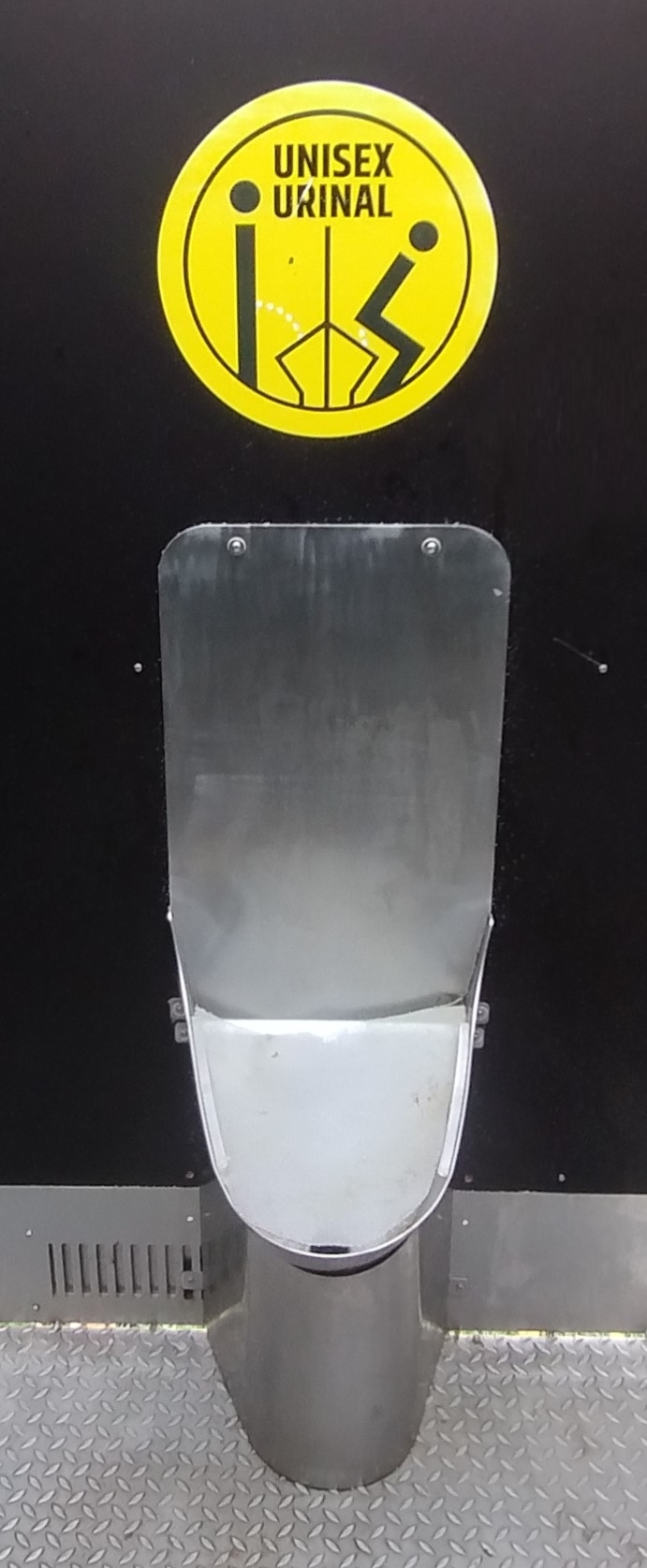
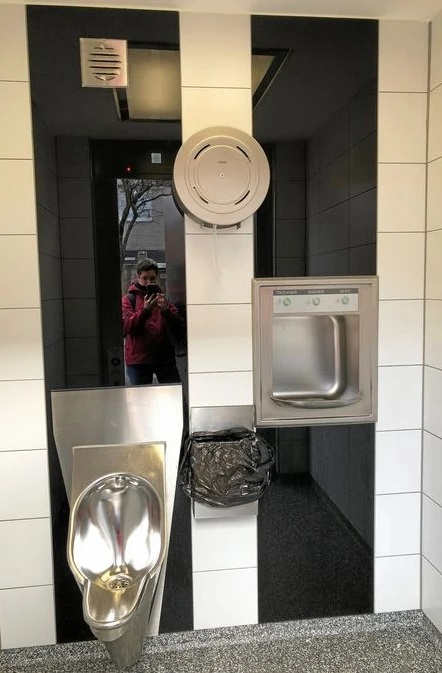
Unisex-urinals in public restrooms in Germany: in Berlin (left) and Braunschweig (right)

In the 1990s, a number of prototypes were developed for female urinals, of which only three were finally ready for the market and are now used: the "Lady P" by Sphinx Sanitair, (Note: These urinals would expect females to hover.) the "Lady Loo" by GBH and the "Girly" by Ceramica Catalano, which has won several design awards. Since the 2000s, female urinals have been introduced in a few European public toilets, with more models, like "Ona" designed by Cajsa Flensburg, "She-Pee", (Note: These urinals would give females devices for standing urination.) "WC3" used with P-mate, "Peescape" by Alexander Schweder, "madamePee" founded by Nathalie des Isnards (2018), "Lapee" created by Gina Périer (2019), "Marcelle" (2019), "Peequal", "NPK" and "Uritrottoir" by Ekovore, and "MISSOIR" by Lena Olvedi, having been developed.

In the course of the development towards unisex toilets, designers and developers are increasingly faced with the challenge of creating gender-appropriate solutions. Models, like "Uni-Pee" designed by Tamar Dax, "We P" designed by Michal Farago, "MissWizz" from Ellen Lejeune, "UriLift" from Pop-Up Toilet Company, "Captain" by Uridan, "Ti'Pi" by Ves Bat Eco, "Weestand" by LiquidGold, and "Urin*all" in collaboration with the Swiss sanitary technology company Urimat, have been developed that can be used comfortably by women and men alike. Urin*all was developed 2022 by two Swiss industrial designers at the FHNW School of Art and Design in Basel. Women use the front part while men use the rear area, so that facilities for fast and contactless urination are available to people of any gender - thereby enabling more gender equality in public space. The urinal also requires no water and can collect phosphorus, which serves as fertilizer for plants. The all-gender urinal has now been awarded the public prize by Valoo, the Swiss network for sustainable sanitary systems and is currently further developed in collaboration with the Swiss sanitary technology company Urimat.

Berlin now has some unisex toilets and unisex urinals, to be used by both sexes. As of 2017, with the expiration of a contract for public toilets with Wall GmbH, a new toilet concept for public spaces in Berlin is being developed. Urinals which can be used in a similar fashion (facing the wall) by both sexes are an essential part of the future unisex toilet facilities.

Berlin has now taken up the problem heroically and is planning urinals for women and men in all public toilets. This is part of the toilet concept for Berlin, which was presented last week by the Senate Department for Environment, Transport and Climate Protection, together with the company Zebralog and Technische Universität Berlin. The advantage of the unisex urinal is that it catches women's and men's urine stream earlier and thus avoids the otherwise unavoidable splashing and is thus simply more hygienic. Therefore, the urinal can be conveniently used by both sexes. For gender justice[...]!

— Wienerin

In 2023, sustainable toilets that do not require water were installed in various parks and public places throughout the city of Berlin. As an alternative to the sit-down toilet, there is a urinal for women and men. The unisex urinal is built so that women can urinate while squatting and men while standing. According to Florian Augustin, managing director of the manufacturing company Finizio, "after some initial skepticism, the urinal is being enthusiastically accepted by women."

== Problems with implementation ==
At present, two different arrangements are currently being implemented in practice: a row arrangement (usually with a partition as a separating element), comparable to male urinals; and in individual booths or cabins, as in classic toilets. The main advantage compared to the classic toilet, compact space requirements, is lost with the latter design. With a row arrangement, the density of facilities can be increased, resulting in shorter wait times. However, this is not the case with the booth arrangement, in which a classic toilet bowl is simply replaced by a urinal.

The booth solution is often proposed with the argument that female use of open urinals is socially unacceptable and associated with embarrassment. However, urination while in the company of others can be a problem for some men as well. There is always the possibility to switch to a classical toilet stall if the use of urinals is associated with shame (e.g. in the case of paruresis).

Unisex urinals (#2) may be used by both men and women, by combining features of female- (#1) and male- (#3) only urinals.

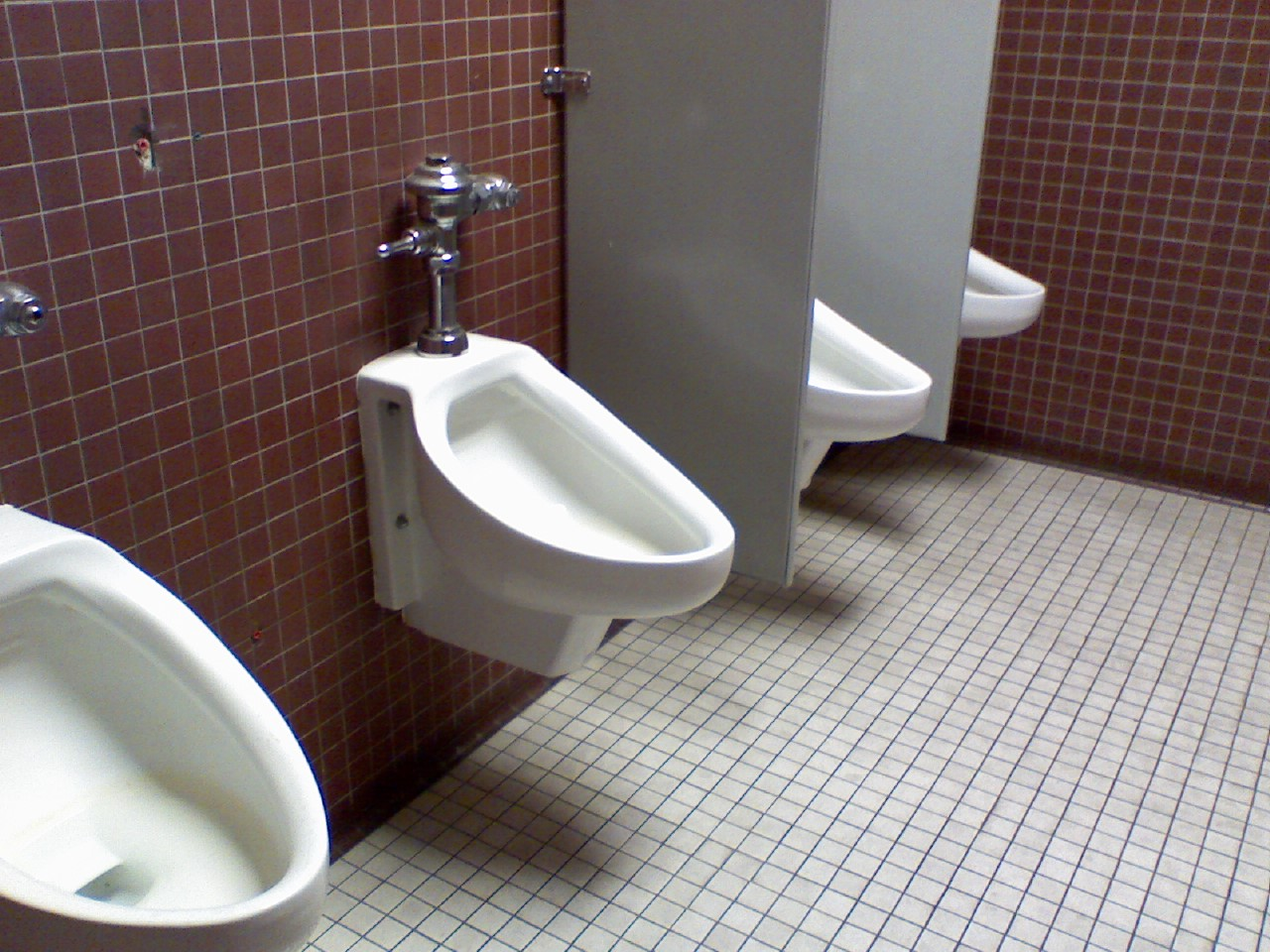
Wall-mounted unisex urinals in open row arrangement in an American ladies bathroom

This problem arises more in the context of increasing trends towards unisex toilets for men and women. A sharing of toilets raises the question of how urinals should be arranged for both sexes in the room. While toilets are usually housed in booths with lockable doors, urinals are usually installed openly in a row in gender-separated toilets. This construction method requires less space, allows for more people to urinate at the same time while promoting better hygiene and economics, and keeps the toilet stalls cleaner and more available for those who need them - which is currently one of the main advantages of installing male urinals. One possibility would be to continue offering urinals in rows. These could, whether separated into male and female urinals or as unisex urinals, be separated by so-called "pubic walls".

An alternative would be to accommodate urinals for both sexes in booths or to continue offering urinals for men only. However, this would at least limit the above-mentioned advantages of the urinals for women. Accordingly, the German lawyer and author Marcus Werner sees a significant disadvantage in unisex toilets if these would lead to the elimination of urinals in classic open rows.

Therefore, it would be very, very sad if the unisex toilet trend would end up causing men to have to queue up because every urinal would be housed in a booth, which would dramatically reduce the number of facilities. That would be a total waste of time, calculated in terms of gender. Men lose time without women winning. There can be unisex urinals here. But please use the ergonomically wall-mounted urinals in a row. That would take the pressure off everyone.

— Marcus Werner

Urinals arranged in booths have not been popular, since the advantages compared to conventional toilets were not obvious, given the unchanged space requirement. After 13 years, the four ladies' urinals in the Salzburg Congress Center were removed in August 2015 due to a lack of interest. They have been replaced by conventional toilets.

In the unisex toilets planned for the Alamo Drafthouse in Austin (Texas) in 2017, the urinals are to be located in an area separated from the entrance area by a door. These are designed as unisex urinals and are arranged in open rows within this range. This would allow men and women to use side-by-side urinals in this room, preferably with both sexes standing with their face towards the wall, while those who prefer to not see persons of the opposite sex urinating may use a traditional toilet booth nearby. According to Richard Weiss, the architect who is planning this restroom, this would create the greatest possible freedom of choice for all genders.

== History ==
=== 19th and early 20th century ===
Recent developments in creating urinals for women and for use by both sexes are not a new revolution in sanitation, as some manufacturers suggest. Rather, it is the renaissance of a concept whose roots lie in the 19th century. During the 19th century, in the early days of public toilet development, female urinals were installed and urinals were not thought of as being exclusively for men. For example, the 1897 German Handbuch der Architektur (Handbook of architecture) shows "women's urinals with automatic rinsing"; at that time the advantages featured were less costly installation and water savings:

Pissoirs for the female sex have even been successfully used in recent years. These consist of so-called "urinettes" or porcelain sitting basins with automatic flushing and are set up especially in the waiting halls of railway stations, in shops where many girls are employed, in theatres where there is a large choir or ballet. ... Such "urinettes" have the great fortune of being able to be placed where a 2-inch drainpipe is present, while the rinsing lavatories usually used by women for urination require a 4-inch waste pipe.

— Handbuch der Architektur: "Entwässerungsanlagen amerikanischer Gebäude", 1897

At that time, the female urinal was unable to establish itself in Germany, and they were installed only occasionally. In 1902, on the initiative of the City Building Office, a decision was taken in Munich to install women's urinals throughout the city in public convenience stores. A letter to the Kirchmair Board of Directors, for example, explains the plenary decision of the Baumagistrat on 13 February 1902:

It was suggested by several parties that the various classes of toilets should be abolished, that the establishment should be uniform and that a fee of 5 Pfennig should be charged for all toilets, with the exception of the free toilets, (this corresponds to the II. class), and that free toilets should be set up in all existing sanitary facilities. The construction of women's urinals, such as those found in other cities, was also mentioned.

— Munich City Archive 1902

This idea was pursued further, so that the documents of 13 January 1906 contained plans for concrete implementation:

The basins should be made of cast iron with enamel coating. A seat board is not to be provided. On the other hand, it might be advisable to mount brass rods above the basin, which extend from one wall to another and are fixed there. Older and weaker people could gain support at this pole. An intermittent rinse may be required for both pools every 10 minutes. ... For the first attempts to set up "women's urinals", it may be advisable to choose the locations of such urinals near playgrounds so that nannies or other female supervisors can use the same ones.

— Munich City Archive 1906

In the architectural guide München und seine Bauten (Munich and its buildings) from 1912, the women's urinals in three public toilets (Lerchenfeldstraße, Ottostraße and Max-Weber-Platz) were mentioned in the chapter on "Nursing homes". In contrast to the actual toilets, these were intended as "freehold toilets", i.e. for free use. They enjoyed great popularity and were highly frequented. In the course of the 1910s, there was no further expansion, probably because the free use did not generate income for the city's treasury funds. Finally, the Freiaborte (free public lavatories) for women were converted into fee facilities. A later proposal by the first female city councillor of Munich in 1922 for the reintroduction of those free urinals was dismissed by the exclusively male directors of the Bade- und Bedürfnisanstalten establishments.

This development at the turn of the century was not followed up in Germany and these first approaches were increasingly forgotten.

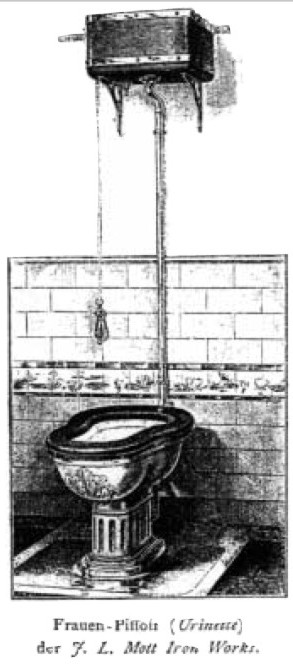
Lady's urinal by J. L. Mott Iron Works (1897)

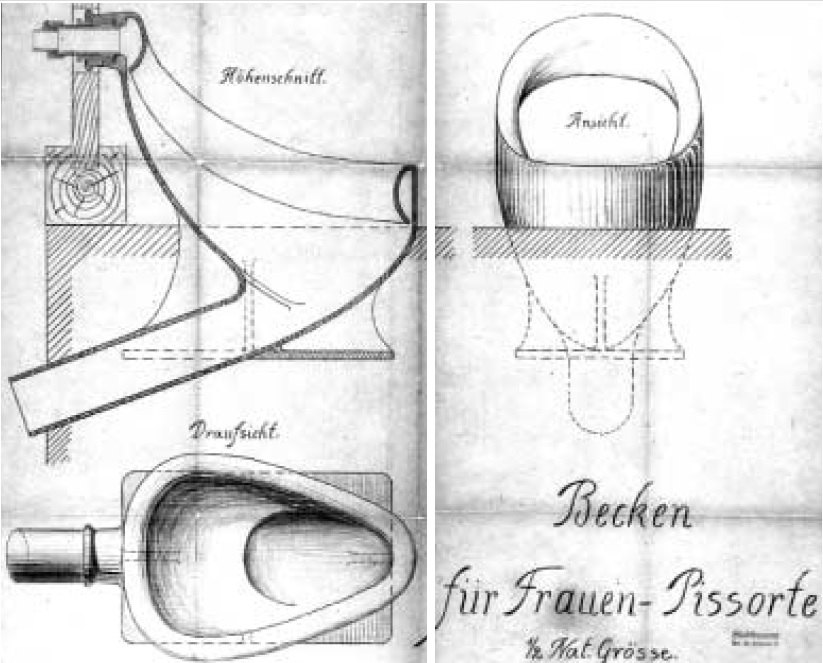
Munich building city council sketch of a women's urinal, planned for public toilets (1906)

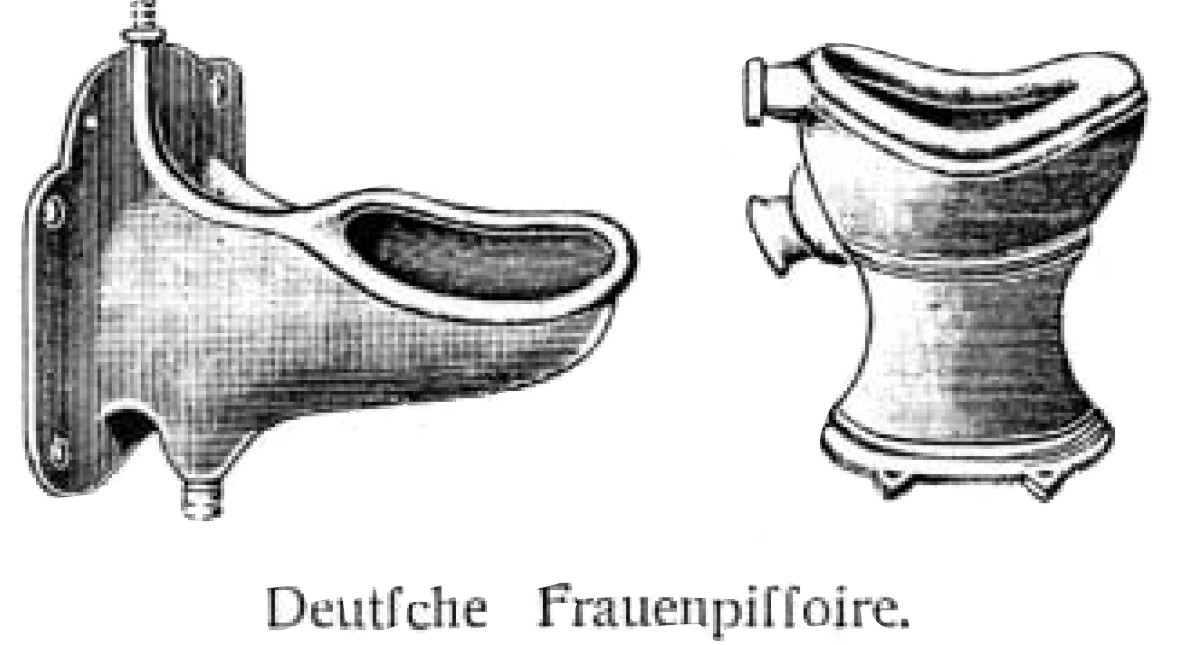
German women's urinals by Villeroy and Boch (1908)

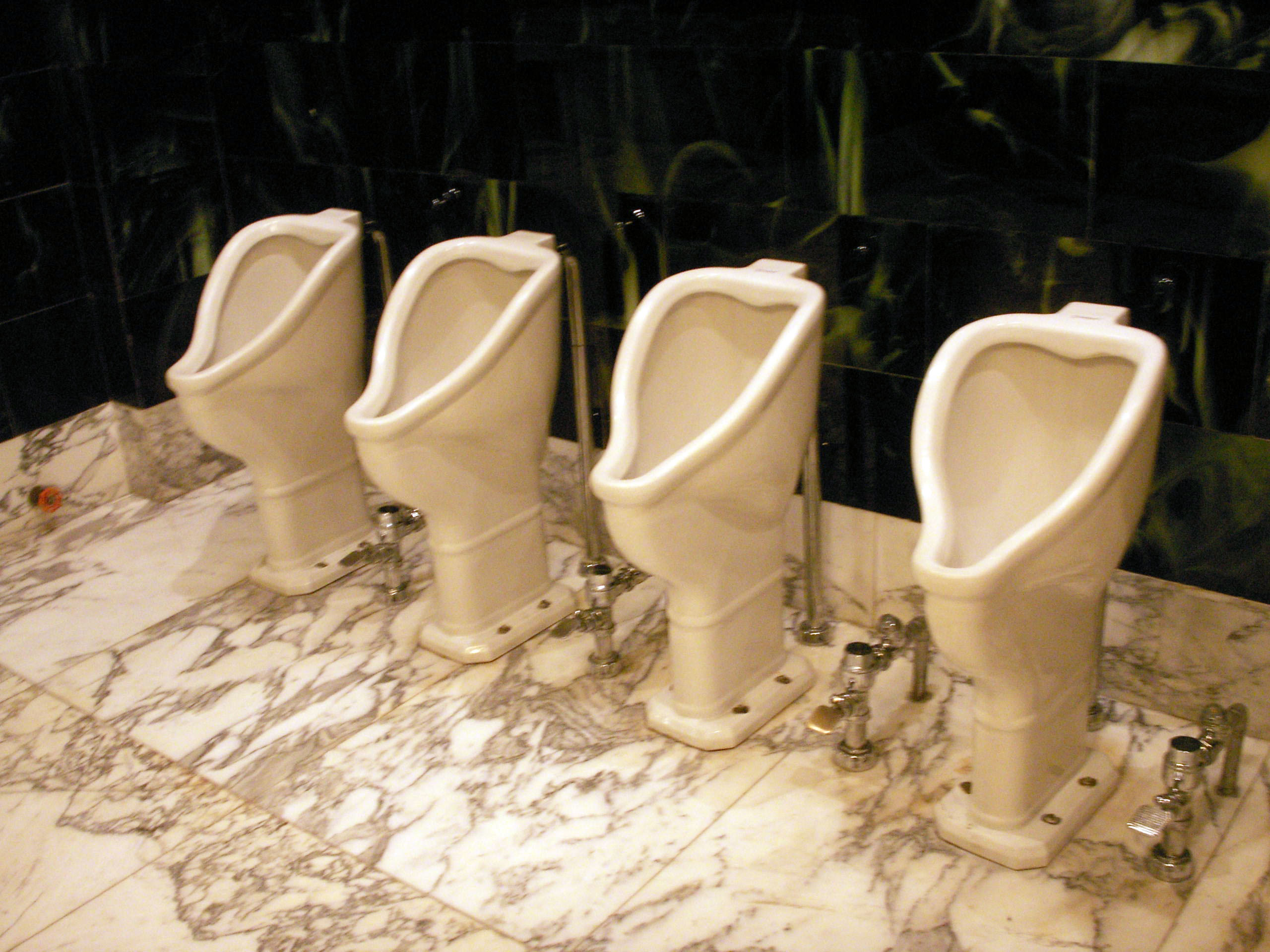
Women's urinals made by the Manstone Company (Mexico, 1940s)

=== 1970s onwards ===
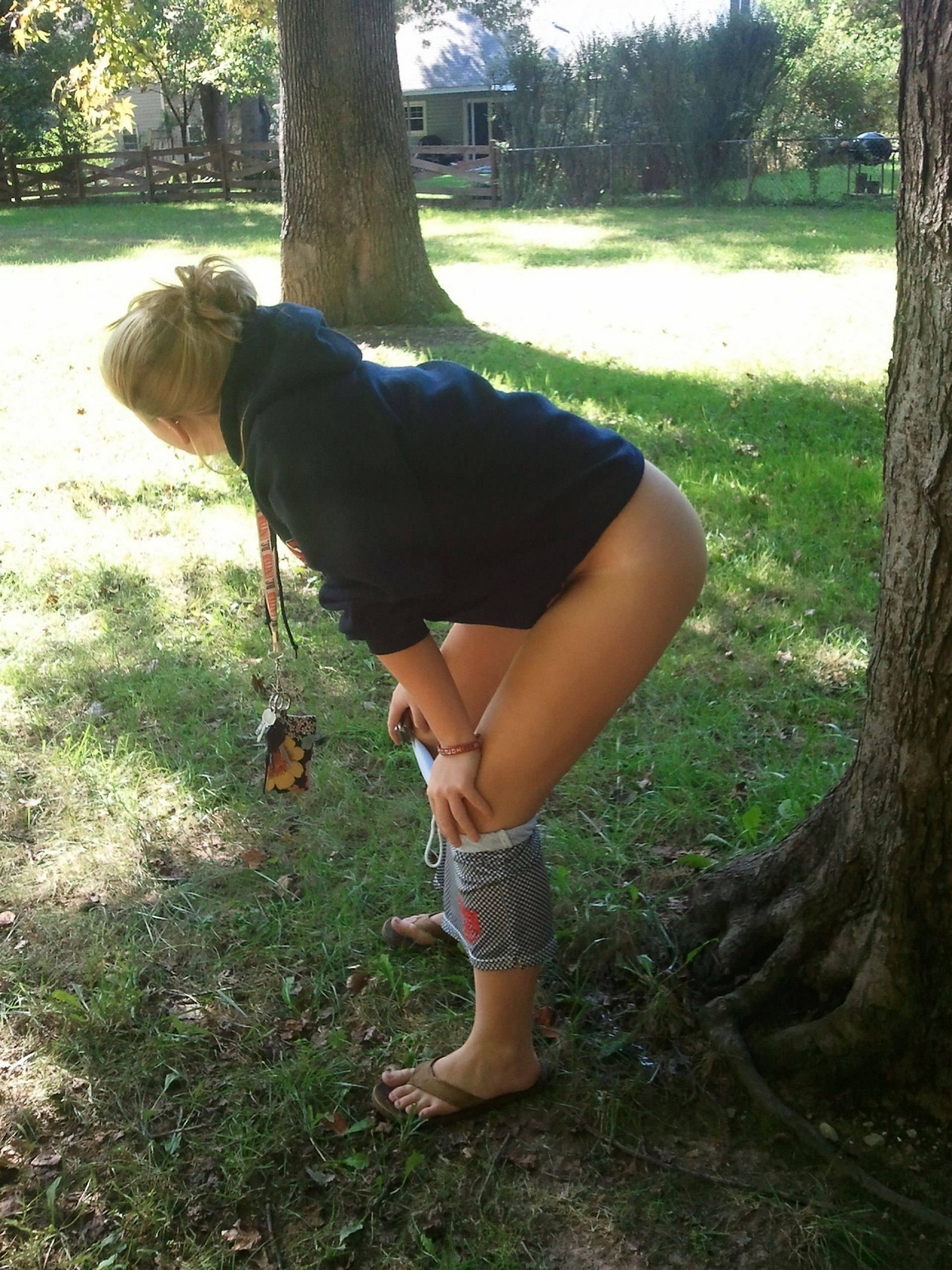
The floating half squat or "skiing position" is a suitable peeing position for a woman using a urinal.

In the 1970s, Alexander Kira, professor of architecture and sanitary engineering at Cornell University, conducted studies on urination behavior of both genders. He pursued the goal of developing sanitary fixtures that are adapted to the human body and its needs, breaking with conventional design specifications.

On a conventional toilet bowl, the "correct" use is determined by the shape of the sanitary fixture. Amongst other things, Kira investigated the body positions that men and women prefer to use when no external guidelines are given, for example while urinating outdoors. Examples include urinating in the forest, on a rock, or in a hole. He examined the trajectories of the urine stream and its controllability, as well as comfort and health aspects of different body positions. Men usually urinate in a standing posture and direct the stream forward by hand. Women prefer to take a squatting position with the stream controlled by the posture of the entire body and directed vertically downwards to slightly obliquely backwards. This position is generally the most comfortable for women and is associated with the lowest spray dispersion.

Until the 1970s, a few female urinals were available in the United States from different manufacturers, such as the Sanistand by American Standard Companies and "Hygia" by Kohler Co. In the 1980s and 1990s various concepts and prototypes were proposed, although most of them were not developed beyond the design stage. Female urinals have become more common since the turn of the millennium and are marketed commercially, primarily in Europe.

From 1950 to 1973, the American Standard company marketed its mass-produced Sanistand. It did not provide significant advantages over conventional toilets, because it used just as much floor space and water for flushing. Its main selling point was that it was specifically designed for women to use without bodily contact.

Several other commercially unsuccessful designs, like "She-inal" by Kathie Jones (1990s), have been tried since then, but they required the user either to hover awkwardly or to bring her genitals into close contact with the fixture. Current clothes fashions, such as pantyhose and slacks, inhibit women from using them because they do not want their garments to touch the urinal or the floor. In case any women have little experience with urinals and do not know whether to approach them forward or backward, instructions may be posted.

Towards the end of the century the artist Kim Dickey produced several designs of a vitreous china prosthetic that allowed women to urinate while standing upright, while J. Yolande Daniels exhibited a design called FEMMEpissoire in 1996 which, by means of stirrups and leaning back, allowed a user to "allow its user to observe her body evacuating itself of urine", the design being the first with this characteristic.

=== Early 21st century ===
The supply of public female urinals is conditioned by two main trends:

- The growing popularity - especially among young people - of festive outdoor gatherings. This requires mobile devices, easily assembled and dismantled; if necessary, the water supply remains a major constraint.
- Environmental concern, like saving water, reducing waste, and even recycling it. Waterless devices allow for the simplified storage of pure urine for use as a fertilizer.

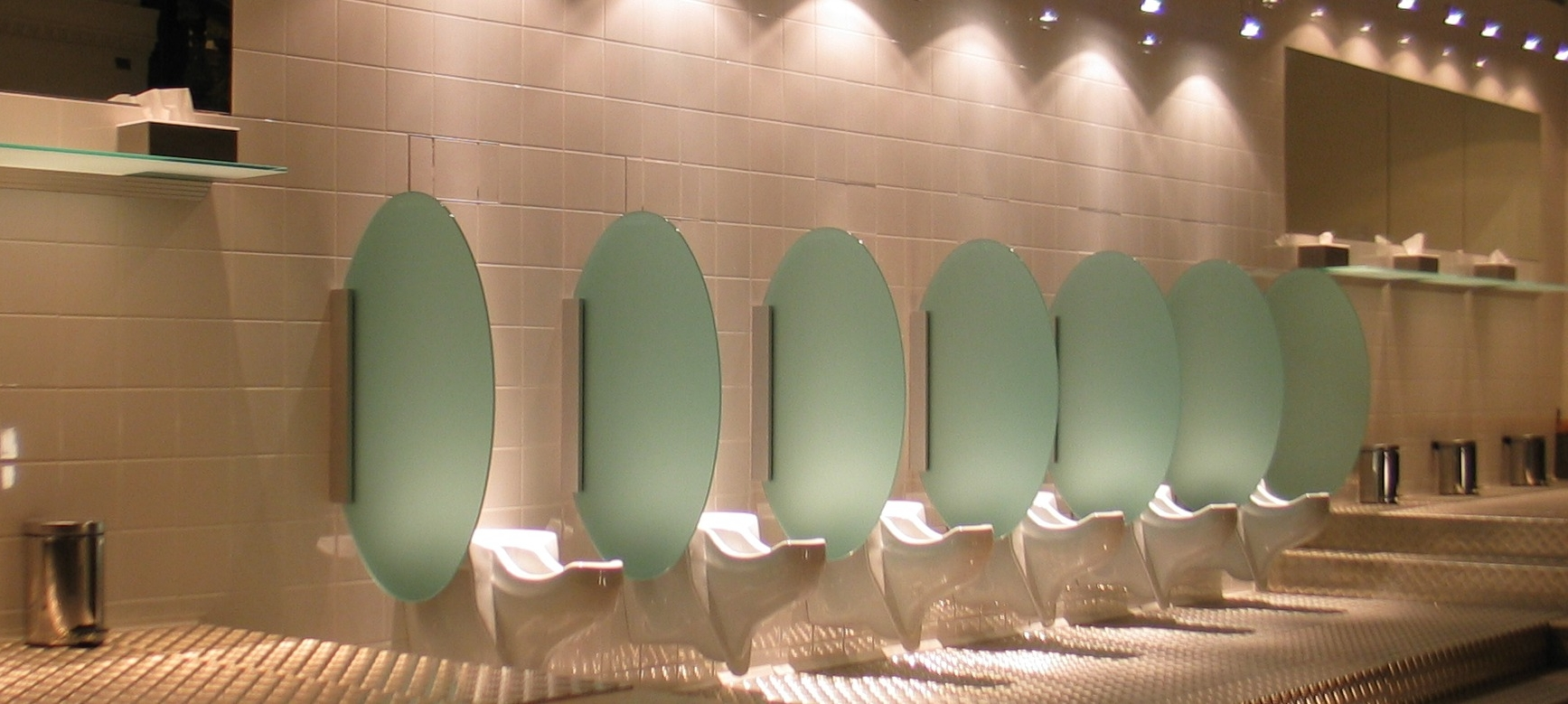
Modern "Lady Loo" female urinals in Germany

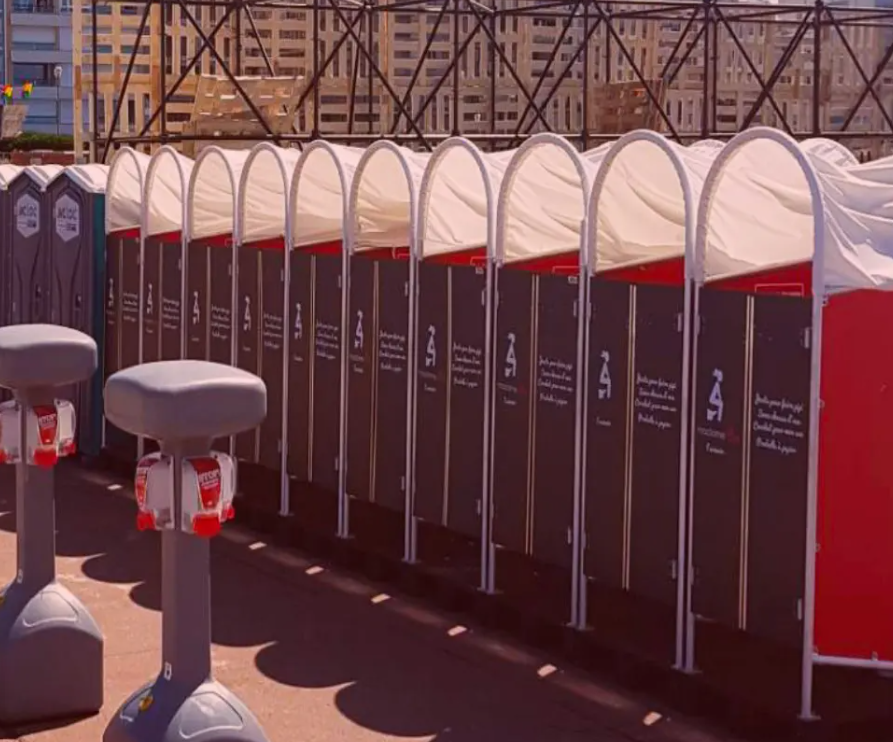
Female urinals row -mobile and waterless- at a festival

Standard trough models intended for use with a specialised disposable funnel have been introduced with some success, at outdoor festivals such as Glastonbury in 2004, to reduce dwell times and to alleviate long queues. In 2011 a portable female urinal, the Pollee, was introduced at the Roskilde Festival in Denmark and was received enthusiastically by female festival visitors:

"Quite frankly: the girls' response at the festival was overwhelming. We have talked to hundreds of girls and although we received ideas for improvement, the overall message was: We use it and we love it!"—Christian Pagh

Lapee mobile urinals have been tested in Toulouse (France). Those of MadamePee - mobile and without water - have equipped the Hellfest festival (Clisson, France) or Solidays (Paris) and longer-lasting events such as Paris Plages.

== Society and culture ==
=== Female bodies in public space ===
The practice of urination by women in public space is conditioned by cultural and societal features:

- Women in Western societies are educated to urinate seated or squatting and men to urinate while standing. Additionally women (especially when wearing pants) must remove clothes and reveal more of their body than men. This is generally why in public toilets, women only have individual and partitioned cubicles as a possibility for urinating unlike men who have urinals. In addition, social conventions may consider that women must be modest by adopting a reserve behavior when they fulfill their natural needs.
- The fact that women can urinate in a more or less visible way in public space may appear contrary to common morals and etiquette in certain cultures.

=== "Equality of urination" ===
The differences in needs, conventions, and practices translate into a natural biological inequality of urination access between men and women, with queues often longer for women.

The current practice for arranging toilets in public space, to allocate an equal surface area for men (seated toilets and urinals) and for women (seated toilets only), is a source of inequality because women require more time in the restroom than men and the less space occupied by urinals makes it possible to increase the number of stations for men. Urinals for women (non-seated position) are therefore a possible means to move towards "equality of urination".

=== Public surveys ===
A 1999 study surveyed 600 women to determine their interest in having female urinals which could be used in a standing position. The majority of respondents indicated a desire to have such facilities.

A 2011 study conducted in Australia showed that more than half of the women interviewed would use a urinal if it were available.

=== 2017 Dutch campaign ===
Demand is increasing for "urination equality" or "potty parity". A grassroots urination equality campaign in the Netherlands caused a sensation in 2017, with women defiantly using urinals in men's toilets. The protest movement was formed under the name of Zeikwijven ("the wild-peeing women"), which advocates urination equality and takes action against the discrimination of women through by limiting possibilities for urination.

The initiative was triggered after 23-year-old Geerte Piening was sentenced to a fine for urinating in public on the street. Her complaint was rejected on the judicial grounds that Piening should have used a street urinal common in the Netherlands. The objection that this was designed only for men was not accepted: "it may not be comfortable, but it is possible". According to one campaign initiator, the problem is that "it isn't possible for women to urinate in a decent, hygienic and dignified manner in a public urinal designed for men." In 2018, a mobile female urinal called the "Yellow Spot" was created around this protest.

As part of this campaign, women in the Netherlands began to urinate demonstratively in public urinals for men. So, the Dutch city authorities are planning to increasingly offer a unisex version of the Urilift street urinals, which are now available in Dutch city centers, and can be used comfortably by men and women.

Unisex urinals, which can be used by both men and women, are being marketed by various companies. However, these unisex urinals, as well as female-specific urinals, are significantly less common than male urinals. You will typically find a higher number of male urinals in men's public restrooms compared to their presence in private homes. This disparity reflects the traditional focus on male urinals in public facilities, which cater to a larger number of people and prioritize quick and efficient use.

Unisex and female urinals, while available, have not yet become as widespread, possibly due to cultural norms and differing levels of market demand. Despite the benefits they offer, such as reduced wait times and water savings, their adoption has been slower.

== See also ==
- Public toilets
- Female urination device
- Pollee, mobile female urinal
- madamePee
- Sanitation
- Unisex public toilet
