= Cameltoe =

Cameltoe may refer to:

- Camel toe, the outline of a woman's genitalia
- Cameltoe, a 2003 single by FannyPack
- Camel Toe (album), a 2002 comedy album
- Camel, the widened toes on hoofs of camelids

== See also ==
- Cameltosis, a Tre Hardson track
- Camel joe, a cartoon mascot
- Mooseknuckle or manbulge, the male equivalent of the cameltoe
