= GoGirl =

Female urination device

GoGirl is an American brand of female urination device introduced in 2009. A CNN video news story that year described the product as a "cultural phenomenon".

Personal hygiene products that aid women in urinating while standing up are not new. The GoGirl product is based on a 20-year-old design by a doctor. It was rebranded and relaunched in January 2009 at the Minnesota State Fair in St. Paul, Minnesota by FemMed, a company based in Minnetonka, Minnesota. It is a vessel made of flexible pink or purple medical-grade silicone with a splash guard on one end which the operator presses against her body. It has a spout on the other side, out of which the urine streams by pressure from a woman's natural flow.

GoGirl was CAD engineered and refined as a design over ten years to fit a woman's body. The product is made from a "class IV" medical grade silicone, which is more supple than many rubber or silicone products. GoGirl is naturally hypoallergenic. GoGirl works with a woman's body to create pressure which creates less spray and splatter. The product comes as a kit in a small tube with the GoGirl, tissues and a storage baggie. It is designed to be a compact travel aid.

In 2013 GoGirl added an extension tube to its product, which may meet special military or medical needs.

As of 2014, GoGirl can be found in more than 3,500 US retail locations and in more than 45 countries.
