= MadamePee =

Mobile female urinal

madamePee
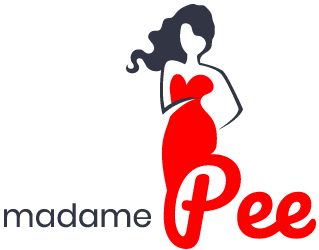
- Type: private
- Founded: 2018
- Founder: Nathalie_des_Isnards
- Headquarters: Paris (France)
- Website: https://www.madamepee.com/en/home/

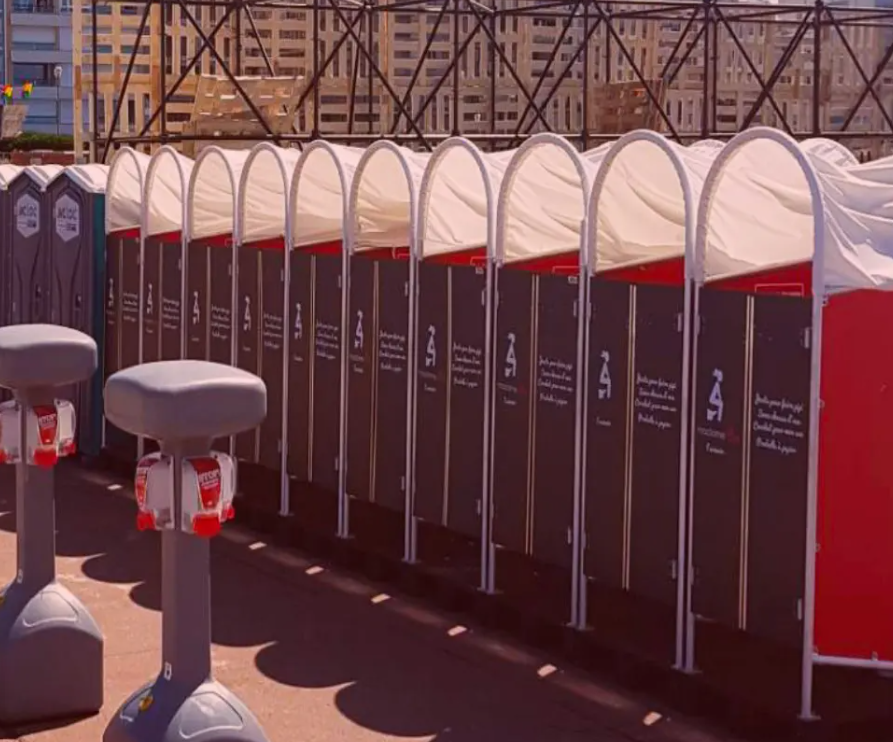
Row of madamePee cabins at an outdoor event.

madamePee is a mobile female urinal, without contact and without water supply. It is designed to be used at public events such as concerts or music festivals, but also in more durable situations such as construction sites, public gardens, etc.

== Background ==
Female urination in public events is an ongoing issue. Differences in needs, conventions and practices translate into a blatant inequality of access between men and women, with longer queues and waiting times for women. Since the beginning of the 20th century, many initiatives have been taken. To deal with this problem, portable individual urinals, men-like urinals but adapted to the women morphology, unisex urinals, specific cabin urinals have been introduced. However, no standard and durable solution has been found and adopted.

== Rationales ==
Implementation in public of female urinals has psychological and social implications, which strongly depend on the cultural environment. The degree of intimacy preservation is an important issue, viewed differently in unisex toilets or in cabin toilets.

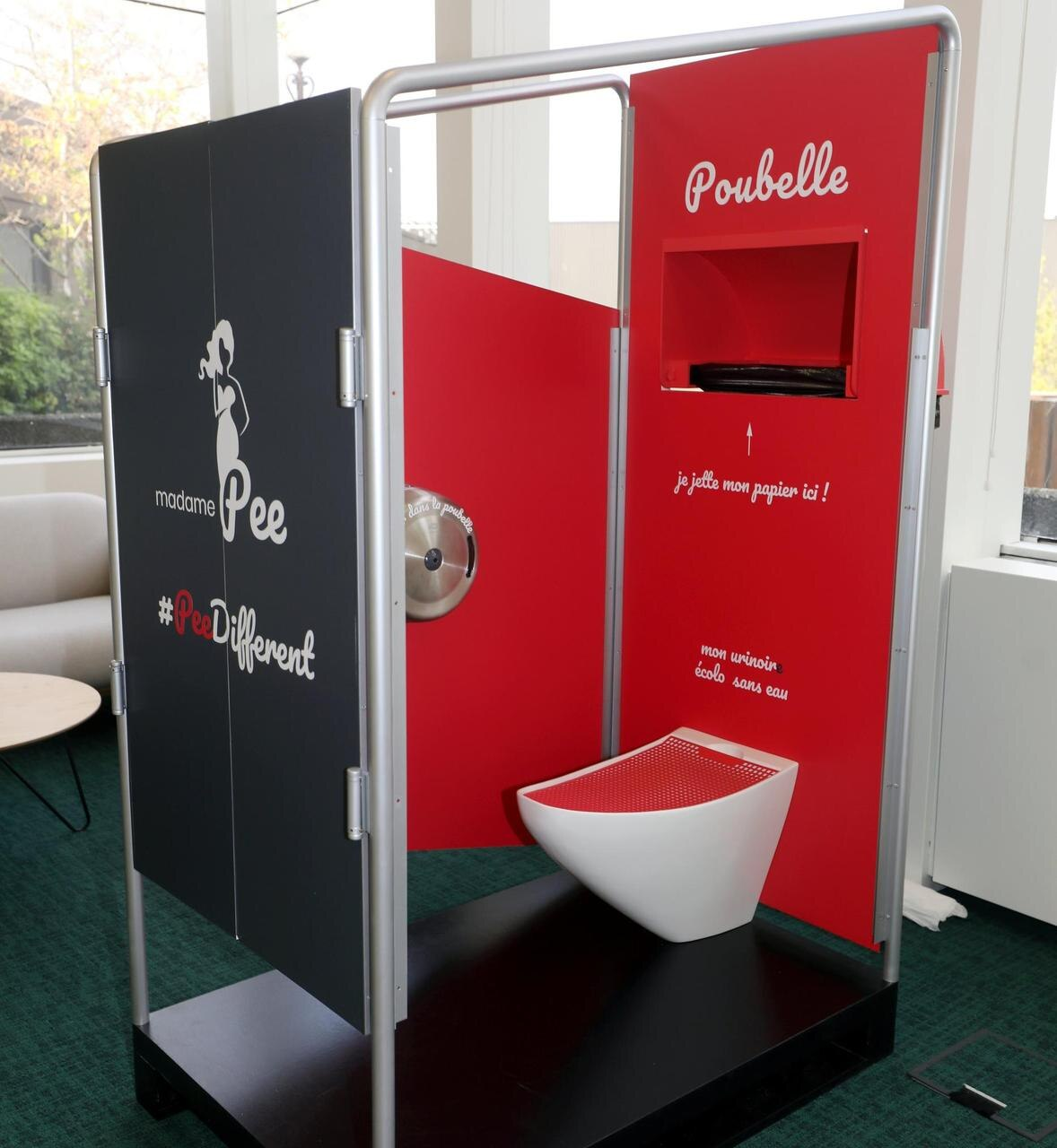
madamePee cabin (side view with a partition removed)

== Development ==
After missing a performance at music festival due the time spent to access the toilets, Nathalie des Isnards contacted several designers, installation providers and psychologists to find an industrial solution. Building on the previous experiences, such as the contactless urination devices, madamePee is based on the following premises:

- Mobility: devices should be easily installed and uninstalled;
- Environmental sustainability: no need for water supply (which adds to the mobility above) and urine collection for fertilizer uses;
- Privacy: to meet the needs of various countries and contexts, light cabins with hinged doors, possibly with a veil as roof.

Several patents have been taken, for example for the urinal itself which must not retain bad smells after use.

madamePee cabins have been installed in major public events for several years, such as Hellfest, Parisplages, and Solidays. They are distributed by major rental companies of mobile sanitary facilities. They are now installed in countries outside France: Portugal, Belgium, Andorra, Ivory Coast, Canada.

In 2022, Nathalie des Isnards was recognized as "Woman entrepreneur of the year, favorite of the jury" at the "Women in Industry" trophies (Paris 2022) awarded by the magazine "l'Usine Nouvelle".

== Developments ==
The COVID-19 pandemic halted the holding of outdoor festivals worldwide in the years 2019–2020, they were the first outlet for Madame Pee female urinals. Since the beginning of 2022, madamePee urinals were present at major events such as HellFest 2022 or Solidays in Paris.

The pandemic with restrictions on access to cafes and bistros has highlighted the need for public toilets for women in cities. Large cities in Western Europe are concerned with installing toilets in public places that are easy to maintain, without a water connection; about ten cities in France are experimenting with madamePee urinals permanently installed in urban areas.

Climate change results in extreme drought in Western Europe in 2022, after several unusually dry summers; the use of drinking water in toilets is increasingly questioned and becomes a determining factor in the development of dry toilets (without connection to the drinking water network).

Finally, human urine as fertilizer is an alternative to the use of chemical fertilizers. Urine collection is not possible in general purpose toilets; madamePee type urinals provide pure urine which is collected and transformed.

A version for men has been developed (misterPee 2022) based on the same characteristics as the madamePee urinals: no contact, no water, no need for connection to the sewer. To make its urinals available at events and festivals, madamePee has partnered with major companies in the portable sanitation industry, such as Satellite Industries (2023), headquartered in Plymouth, Minnesota.

In 2022, a European standard on "mobile non-sewer-connected toilet cabins" has been adopted and published in 2023 by AFNOR. It states the requirements of services and products relating to the deployment of cabins and sanitary products and applies to madamePee's products.

In June 2026, madamePee was sold to Satellite Industries. Nathalie des Isnards heads Satellite Industries' new business unit called Public Access & Specialized Sanitation.

== See also ==
- Public toilets
- Pollee
