= Pollee =

Portable female urinal company

Pollee Peebetter
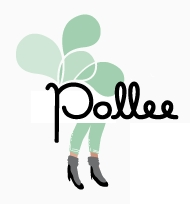
- Company type: Division
- Founded: 2011
- Founder: Christian Pagh
- Headquarters: Copenhagen, Denmark
- Products: Urinals
- Website: peebetter.dk

Pollee is a mobile female urinal, designed by Nuala Collins, Christian Pagh and Sara Nanna and produced by the Danish design bureau UIWE. It is specifically designed to be used at public events such as concerts or music festivals.

== Development ==
In March 2011, the organizers of the Denmark Roskilde Festival, one of the biggest music festivals in Europe, initiated a conference ("The urination summit") titled "Backstage: Piss-Off" to discuss the problems of public sanitation during the festival. The organizers were increasingly confronted with "wild peeing", because the toilet and urinal facilities did not keep up with the growing demand:

"We had really long toilet queues, where it was often women who stood and waited. This meant that many girls ended up using the fence to urinate." — Signe Brink Pedersen, project manager at Roskilde Festival

The Roskilde committee initiated a campaign aimed at "developing human solutions to peeing in public space — for both sexes." The Copenhagen-based UIWE design bureau took part and developed Pollee — an open-air, touch-free urinal for girls as an alternative to the crowded and often unhygienic portable toilets.

== Concept ==
The idea behind Pollee was to provide for women an easy and convenient urination alternative to portable toilets. The plan was to reduce the queues in front of the portable toilets:

"Our drive is that Pollee becomes a real queue-killer that enables girls to get peeing over and done with quickly, so they can get on with the more fun and important things. Queuing is such a waste of life!" — UIWE

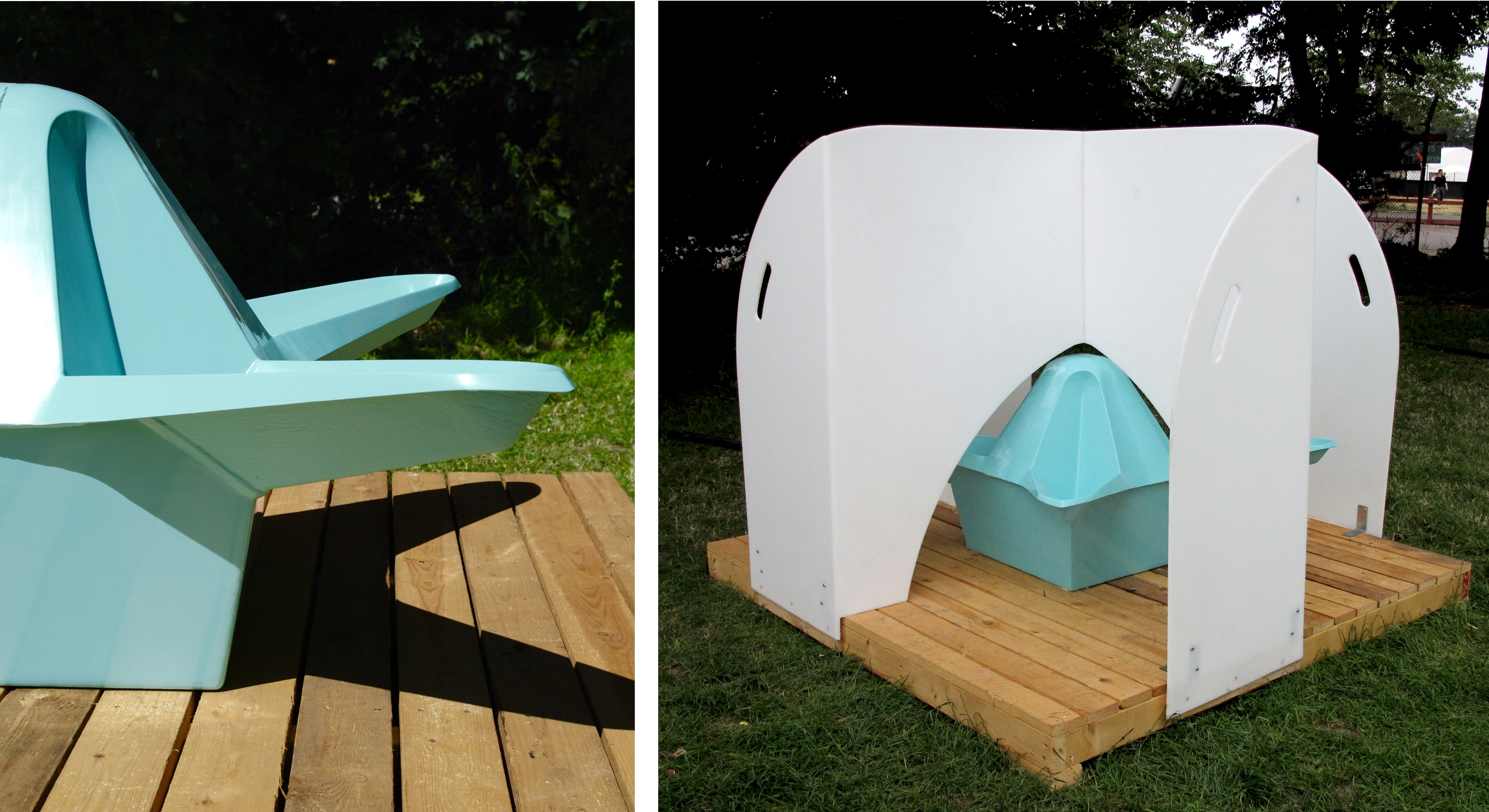
Pollee female urinal

Together with the designers Sara Nanna and Nuala Collins, three prototypes were developed. All prototypes had, to varying degrees, plastic walls for privacy built around four triangular bowls. The urinal is used in a semi-squat position. Pollee is arranged in a crosswise style, allowing four women to urinate simultaneously. Handholds are attached to the walls, that help users to keep a comfortable position.

Three final versions of the Pollee were first introduced at the Roskilde Festival 2011. The introduction was regarded to be successful; the urinal was well received, with many women using it:

"Quite frankly: the girls' response at the festival was overwhelming. We have talked to hundreds of girls and although we received ideas for improvement, the overall message was: We use it and we love it!" — Christian Pagh

== See also ==
- Female urination device
- MadamePee
