= Packing (phallus) =

Wearing padding in the pants or underwear to give the appearance of having a penis

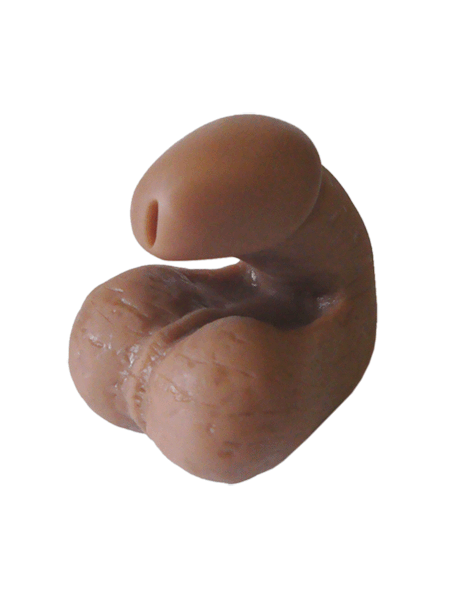
A soft silicone packer

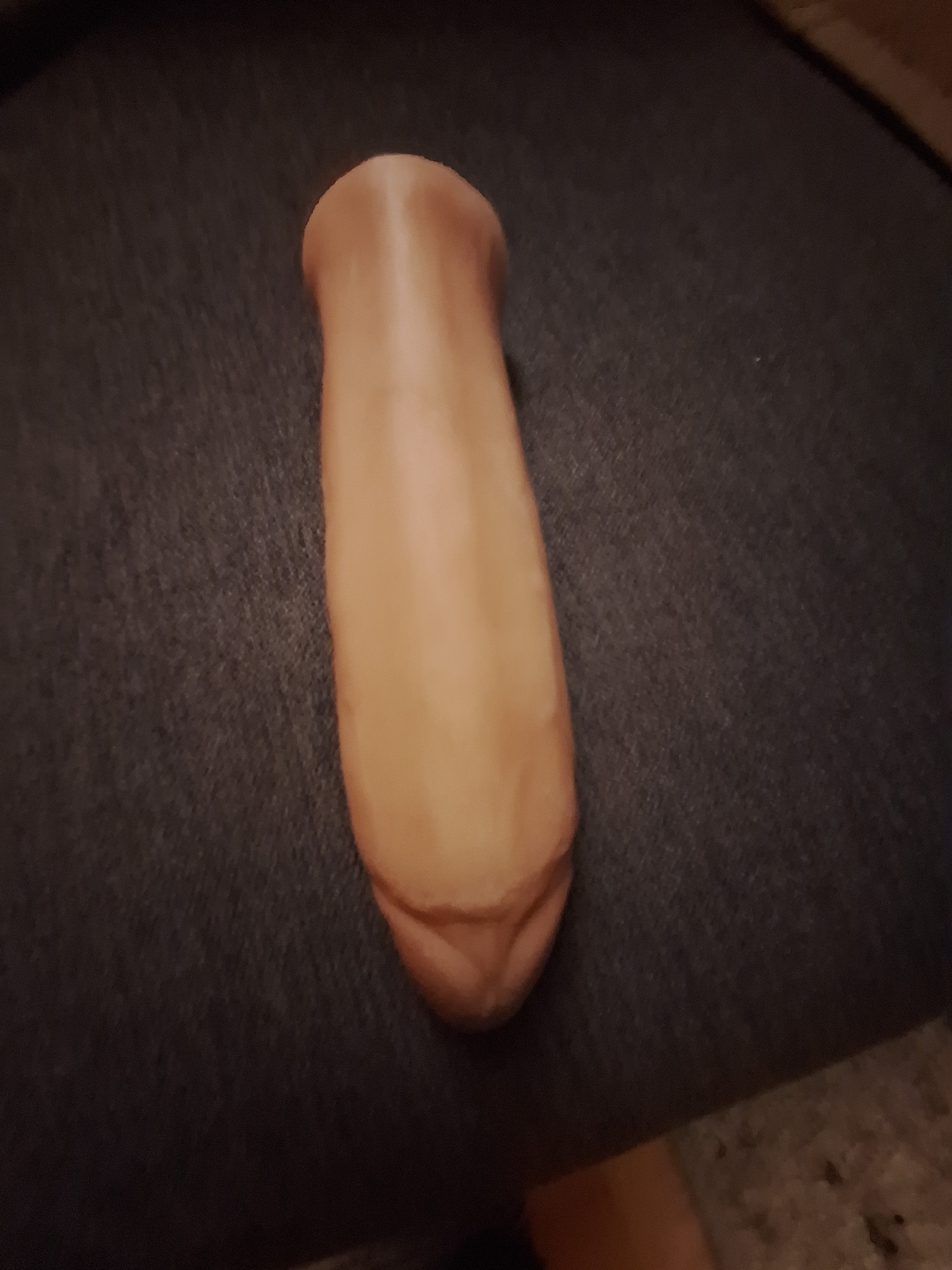
A "hard" silicone packer

Packing is wearing padding or a phallic object in the front of the pants or underwear to give the appearance of having a penis or bulge. Packing is commonly practiced by trans men. People who cross-dress as male may also "pack".

== Packers ==
The object used for packing, sometimes called a "packer", may take the form of only a penis shape or may also incorporate a false scrotum and testicles. Packers may be used to make male clothing hang and move correctly. If a packer is not used, the shape of the clothing is sometimes visibly "empty".

=== Soft packing ===
The phrase "soft packing" refers to packing with a device that cannot be used for sexual penetration. Homemade packers may be very low-tech and consist of rolled-up socks or condoms filled with liquids or gel. The materials used in the manufacturing process include gelatin, latex, and silicone. There are many commercially available packers, which more realistically emulate the size, shape, colour and texture of the male genitals. All soft packers are made of soft, flexible material and simulate a flaccid penis. The term packer most frequently describes the soft models not used for sexual activity. A few packers can be used as stand-to-pee devices (STP). These incorporate a receptacle that is inserted under and against the wearer's urethra. The packer has a tube from the receptacle to the tip, which allows the wearer to urinate through the prosthetic.

=== Hard packing ===
"Hard packing" refers to packing with a device that may be used for sexual penetration. Some such packers are made of firmer material such as silicone, and are flexible enough for packing but firm enough for sexual penetration. The distinction between packers and full-on pegs is not exact. Still others are made of even firmer material, and feature either an internal rod that stays in the shape in which it is bent, or an internal hinge at the base. These types allowing the packer to simulate a flaccid position (if not a flaccid feel), as well as a very firm, erect position. Another term for packers which may be used for sex is "packing dildo". A colloquial expression for the usage of these is "pack and play".

== See also ==
- Penile implant
