= Female urination device =

Device which aids a person with a vagina to urinate while standing upright

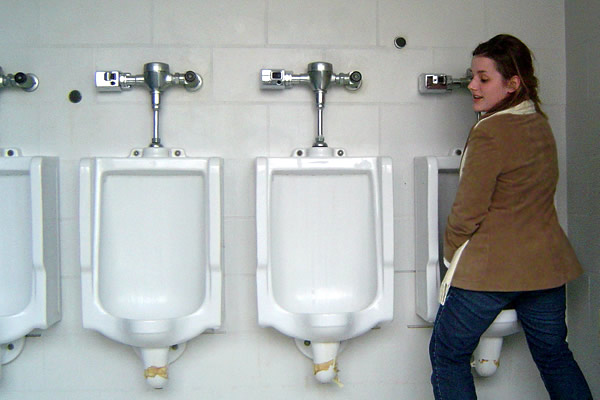
Woman using a female urination device, to adapt to standard men's room urinals

A female urination device (FUD), personal urination device (PUD), female urination aid, or stand-to-pee device (STP) is a device that can be used to more precisely aim the stream of urine while urinating standing upright. Variations range from basic disposable funnels to more elaborate reusable designs. Personal urination devices have increased in popularity since the 1990s. They are used for outdoor occupations and recreation, gender affirmation/safety, and medical reasons.

In addition, fixed installation and relocatable urinals are available for use by women. Some designs require the user to supply their own personal female urination device, while other designs do not have this expectation.

== Portable devices ==
Female urination devices are marketed towards many different groups. For sports and recreation they are sold for camping, traveling, snow sports, caving, rock climbing, diving, hunting/fishing, festivals, long car journeys, and any kind of outdoor pursuit where the toilet facilities are absent or less than desirable. People with physical restrictions such as recovery from hip surgery, broken bones, or those who find it challenging to sit or squat also benefit from these devices.

Since 2005, numerous personal urination devices have appeared on the market. Products come in a variety of designs and materials such as plastic, rubber, silicone and paper; some are reusable and some are disposable. Several devices have been marketed for medical applications, and are sometimes available on prescription.

Occupationally, urinary devices are used by first responders, armed forces, and other outdoor jobs. Some brands are NATO approved, and are supplied to military personnel.

Such devices are used by trans men as "stand-to-pee" devices, or STPs, often to combat gender dysphoria. More discreet solutions such as the "Snee-Kee" are specifically marketed for this purpose. Some stand-to-pee devices mimic the appearance of a penis and double as packers.

Biological males may also want a urinary funnel if they have medical conditions that make it challenging or impossible for them to stand and pee.

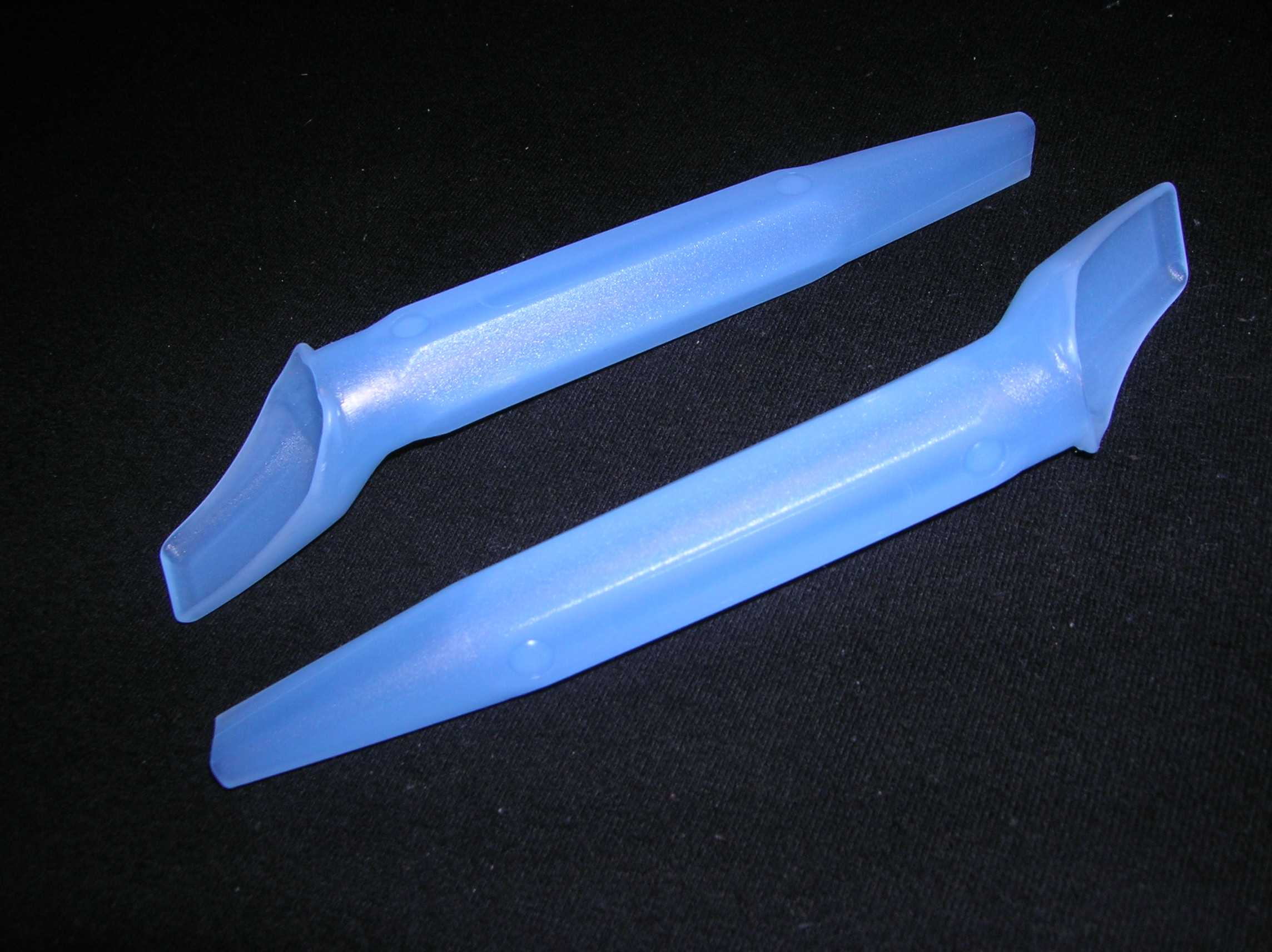
Travelmate

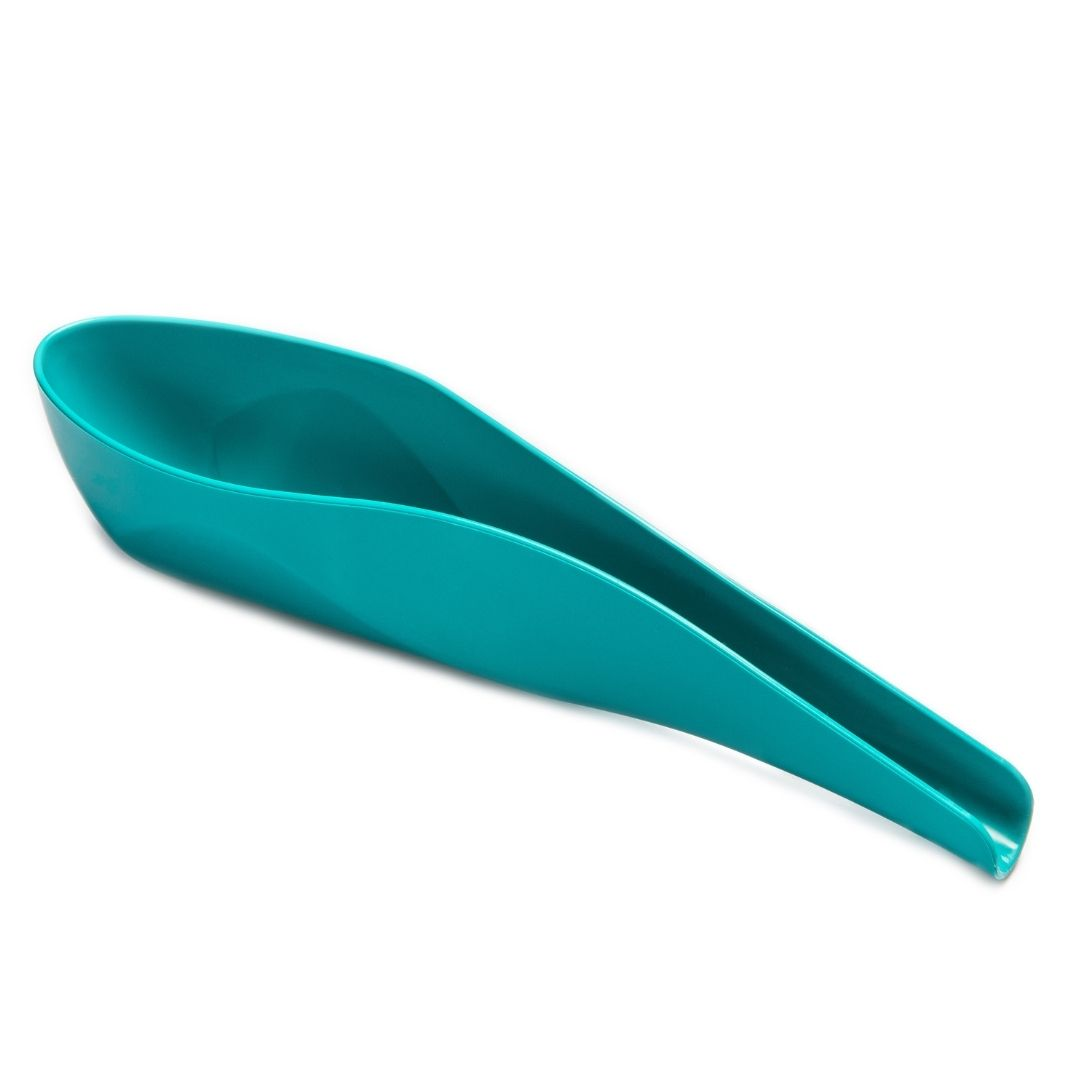
pStyle

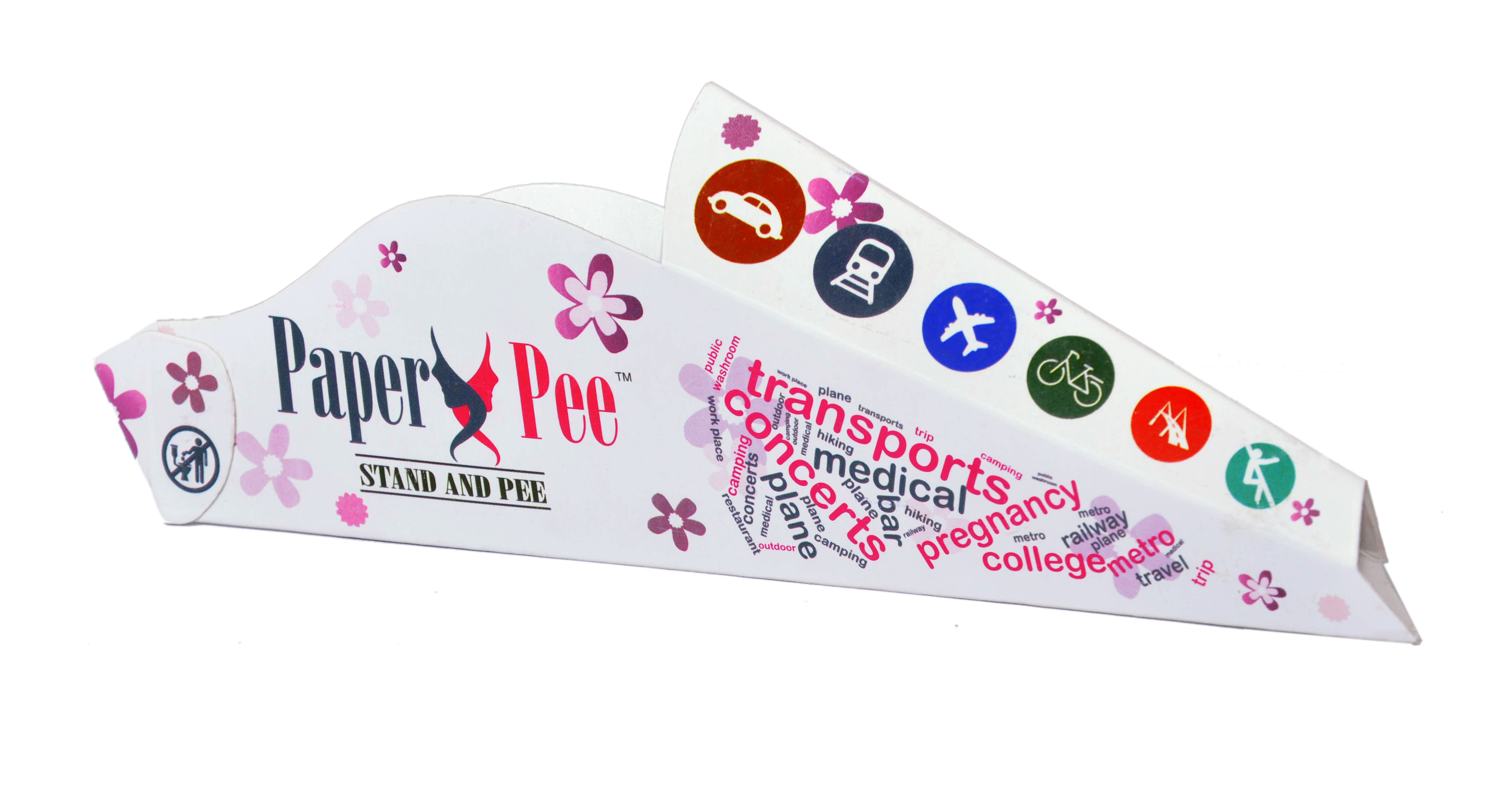
Paper pee

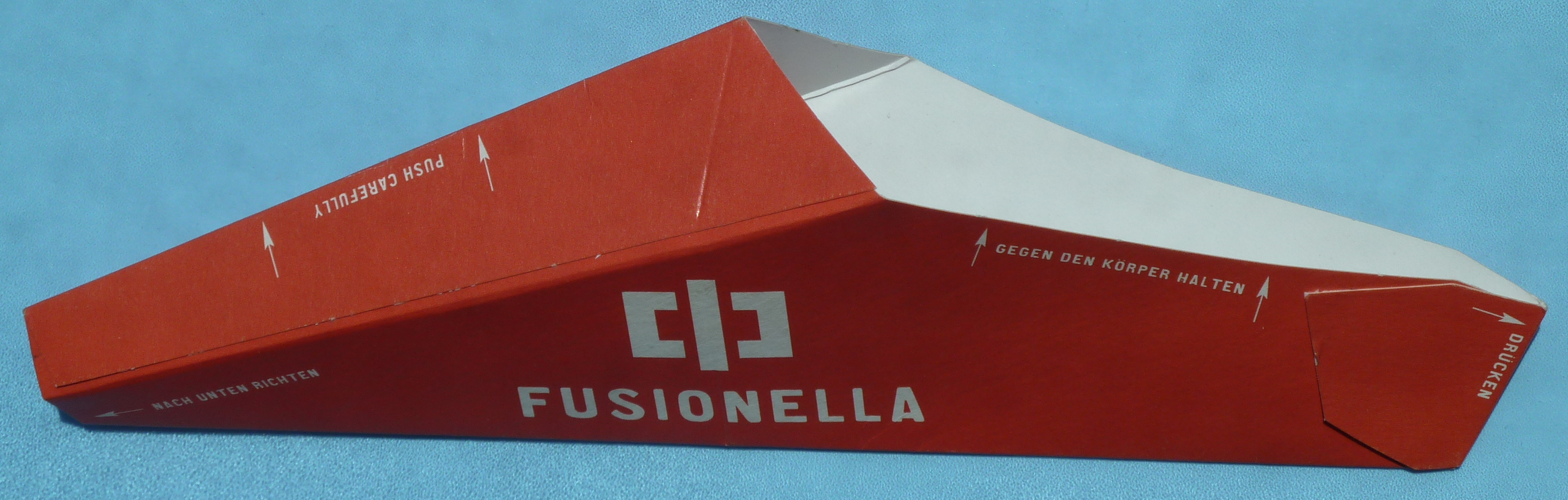
Fusionella

== Female urinals ==
Urinals for a greater variety of bodies have advantages of quick and hygienic use, water conservation, and less need for physical space. Speed of use can be especially important when there is high peak demand, such as in music festivals, theatrical events, sports stadiums, discos, dance clubs, and convention halls.

Special fixed installation designs for female urinals have long been available, supplemented more recently by portable designs. Some designs, including squat toilets, have been considered "unisex", usable by either gender. The fixed designs are typically used by women in a "hovering" posture, standing over them with knees slightly bent.

In addition, small portable urinals including sealable collection containers have been available in female-only and unisex versions. They are often used for travel when immediate disposal is difficult. Initially, medical or hospital devices were pressed into service, but designs specially made for travel eventually appeared. They are used in small aircraft, and for extended stakeouts, such as in a hunting blind or a wildlife observation station.

Conventional urinals which have been designated exclusively for female urination device users have become popular in recent years, including at some major public events where providing adequate toilet facilities is difficult, such as outdoors festivals. To expedite usage, trough urinals may be installed, which the women are expected to use while standing, with small personal female urination devices. Pinkpop 2000 was the first event to accommodate large numbers of female urination devices, and the practice has now spread to events in the Netherlands, Belgium, Switzerland, Canada, Finland, Ireland, and the UK.

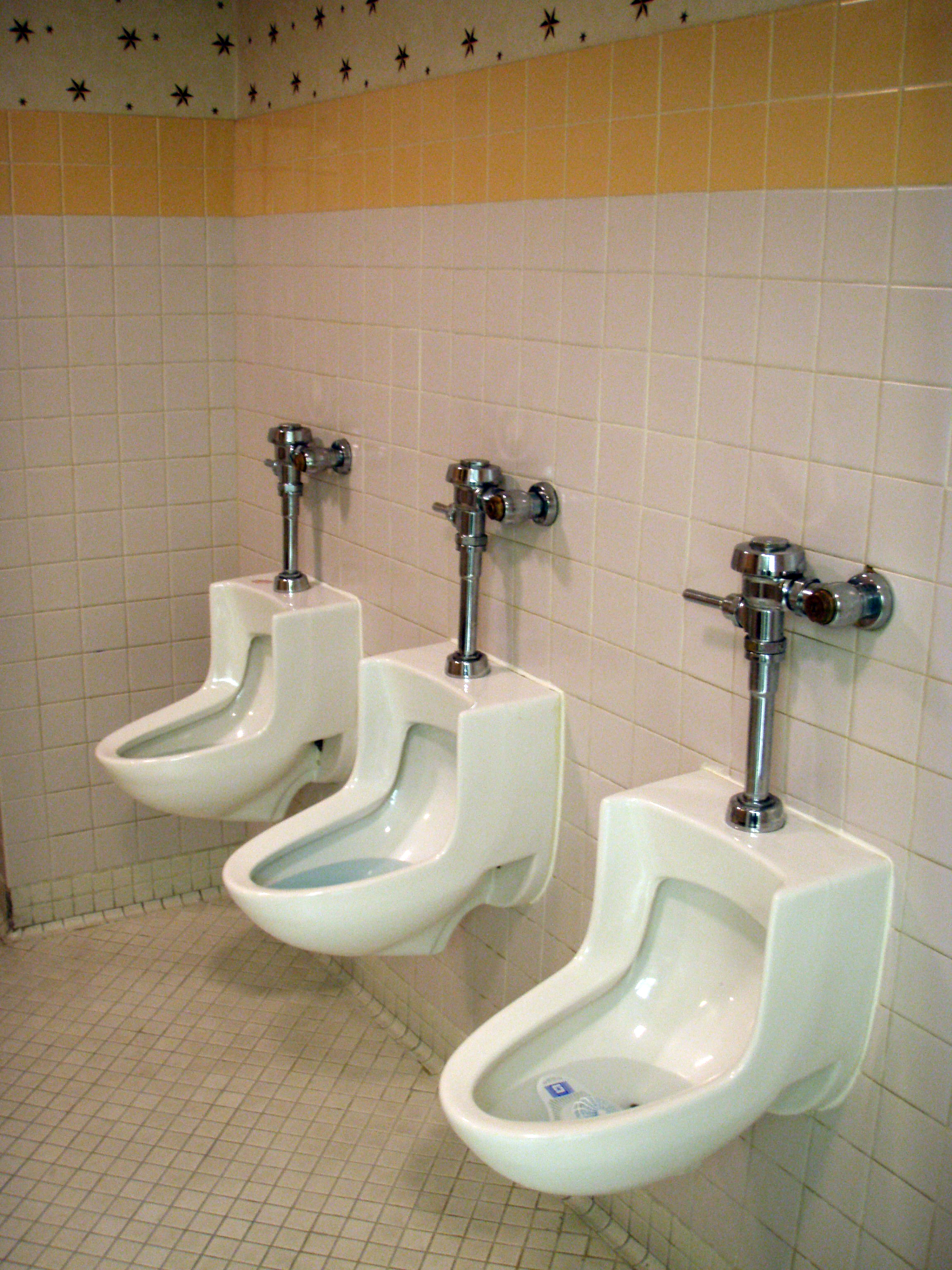
Unisex urinals

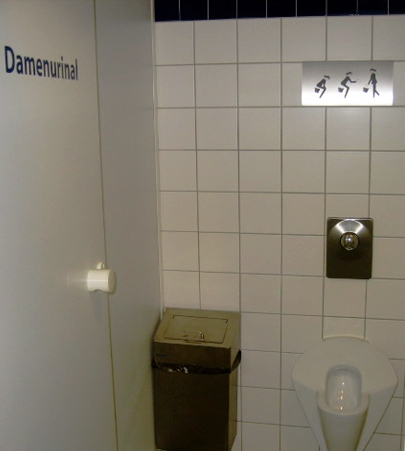
Female urinal at Dortmund Airport, Dortmund, Germany

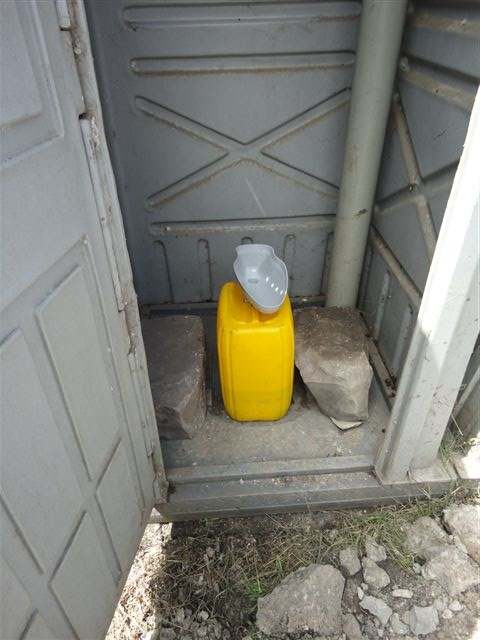
Low-cost female urinal with stones to adjust height

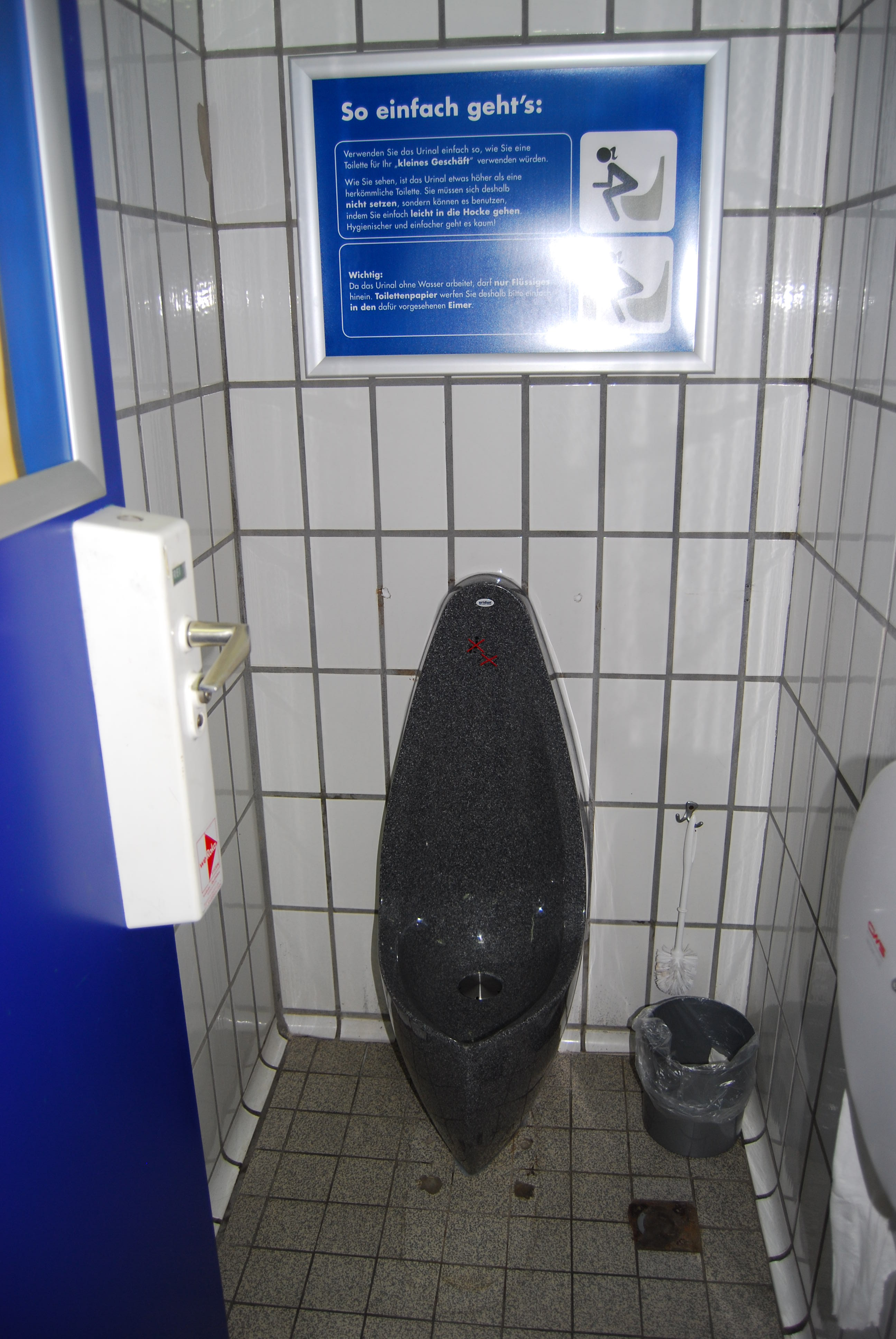
Waterless urinal for women

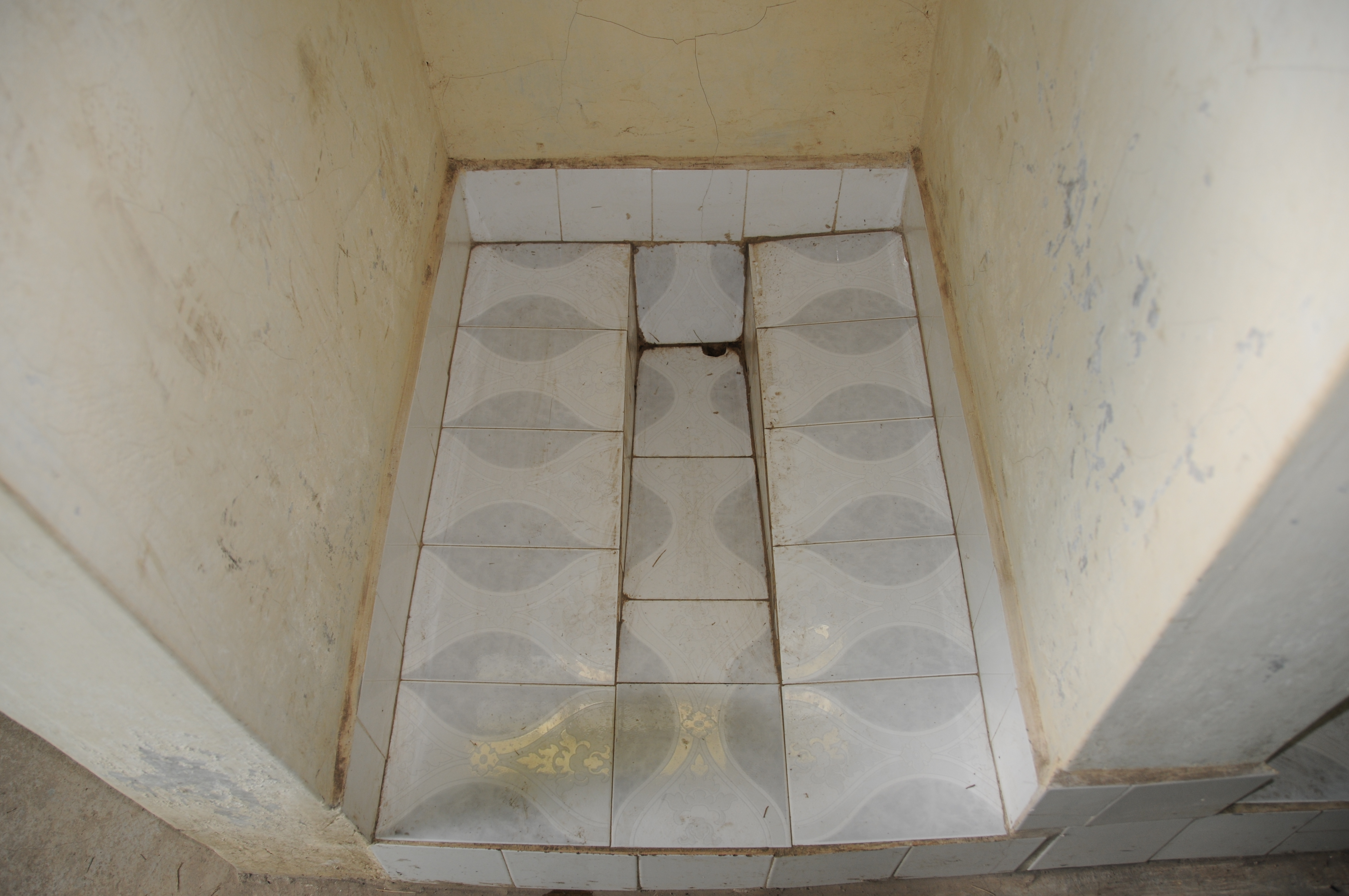
Girls' school urinal in Kenya

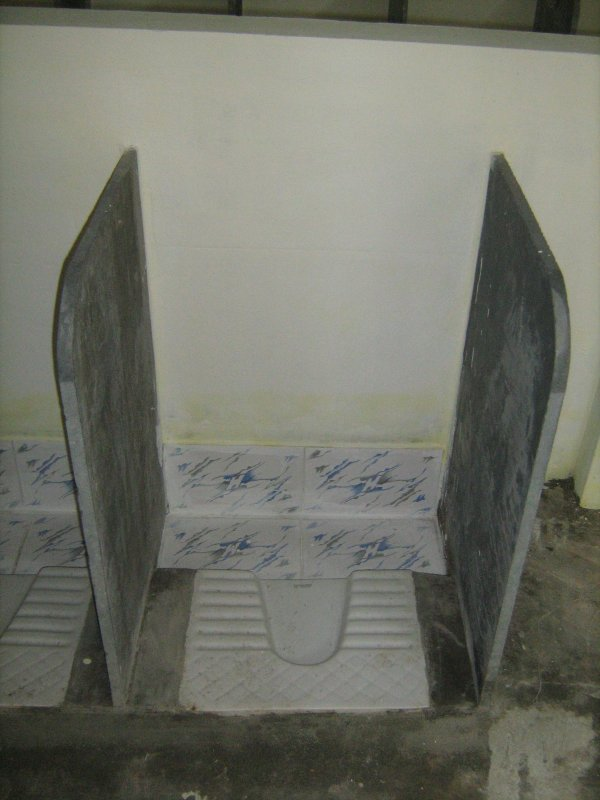
Girls' school urinal in Tamil Nadu, India

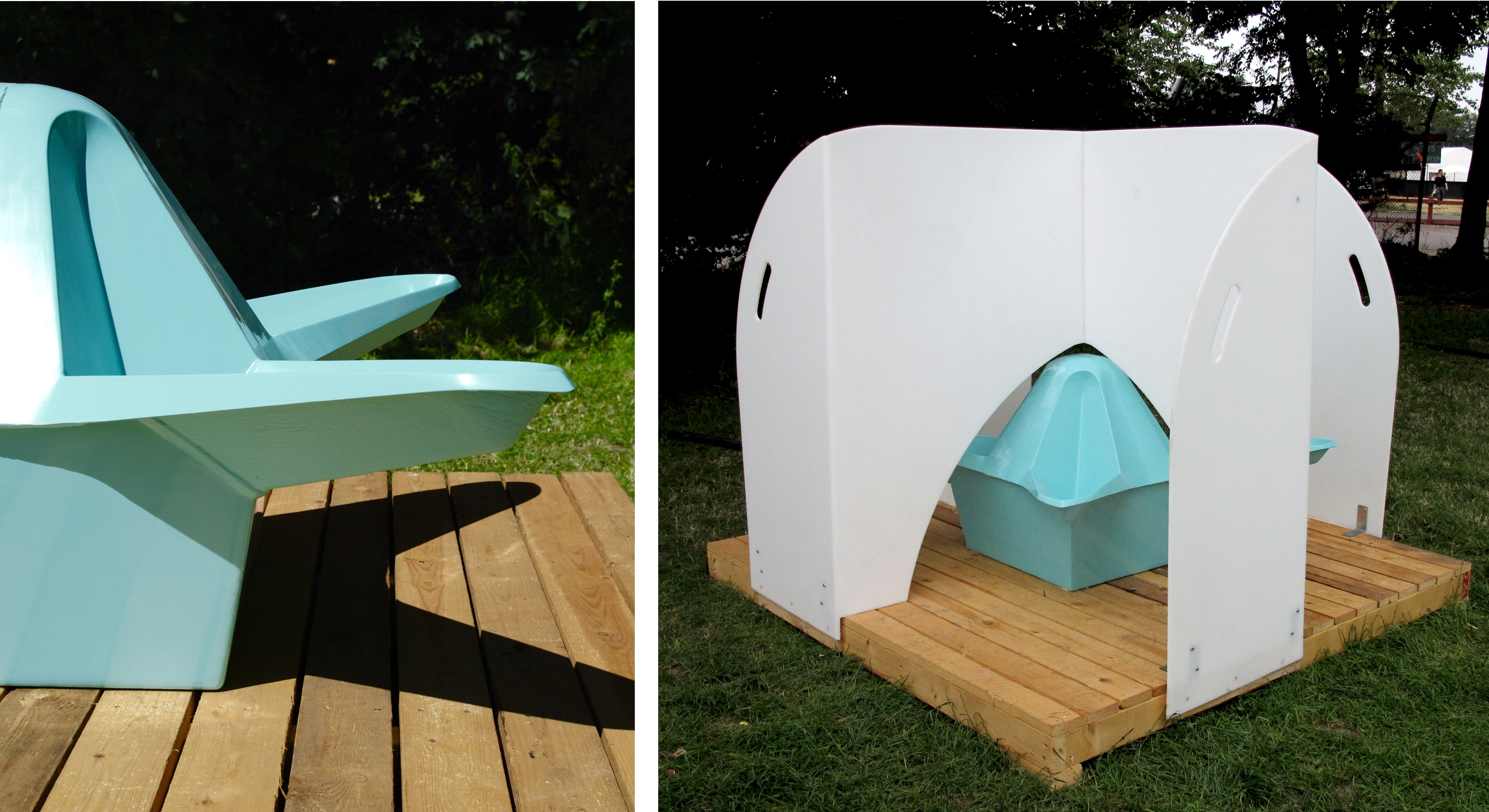
Pollee outdoor female urinals

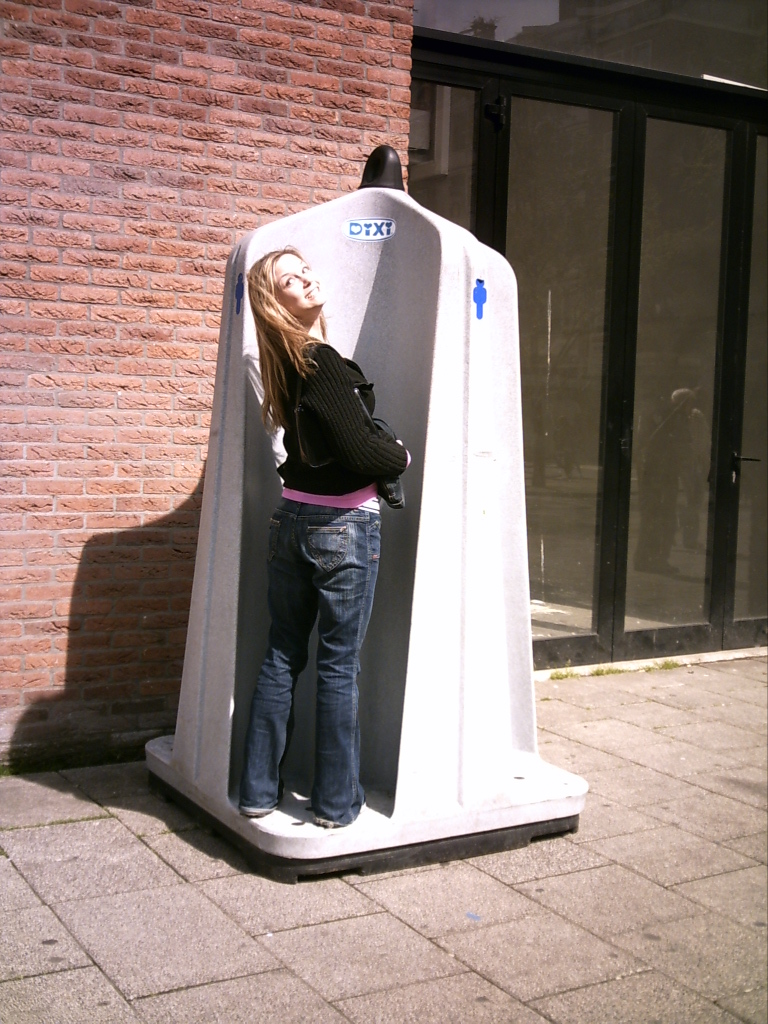
Woman uses an outdoor portable urinal

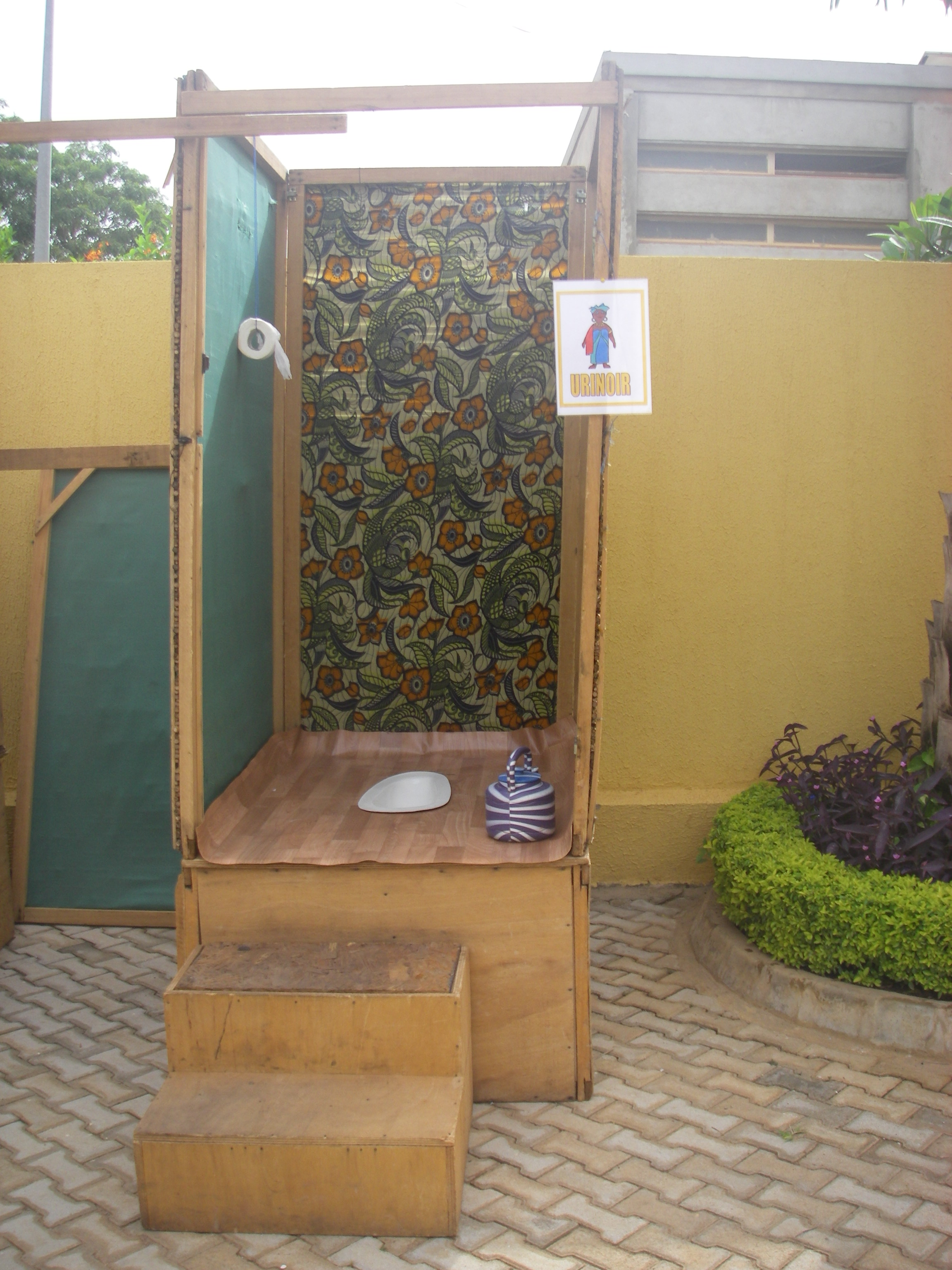
Movable women's urinal

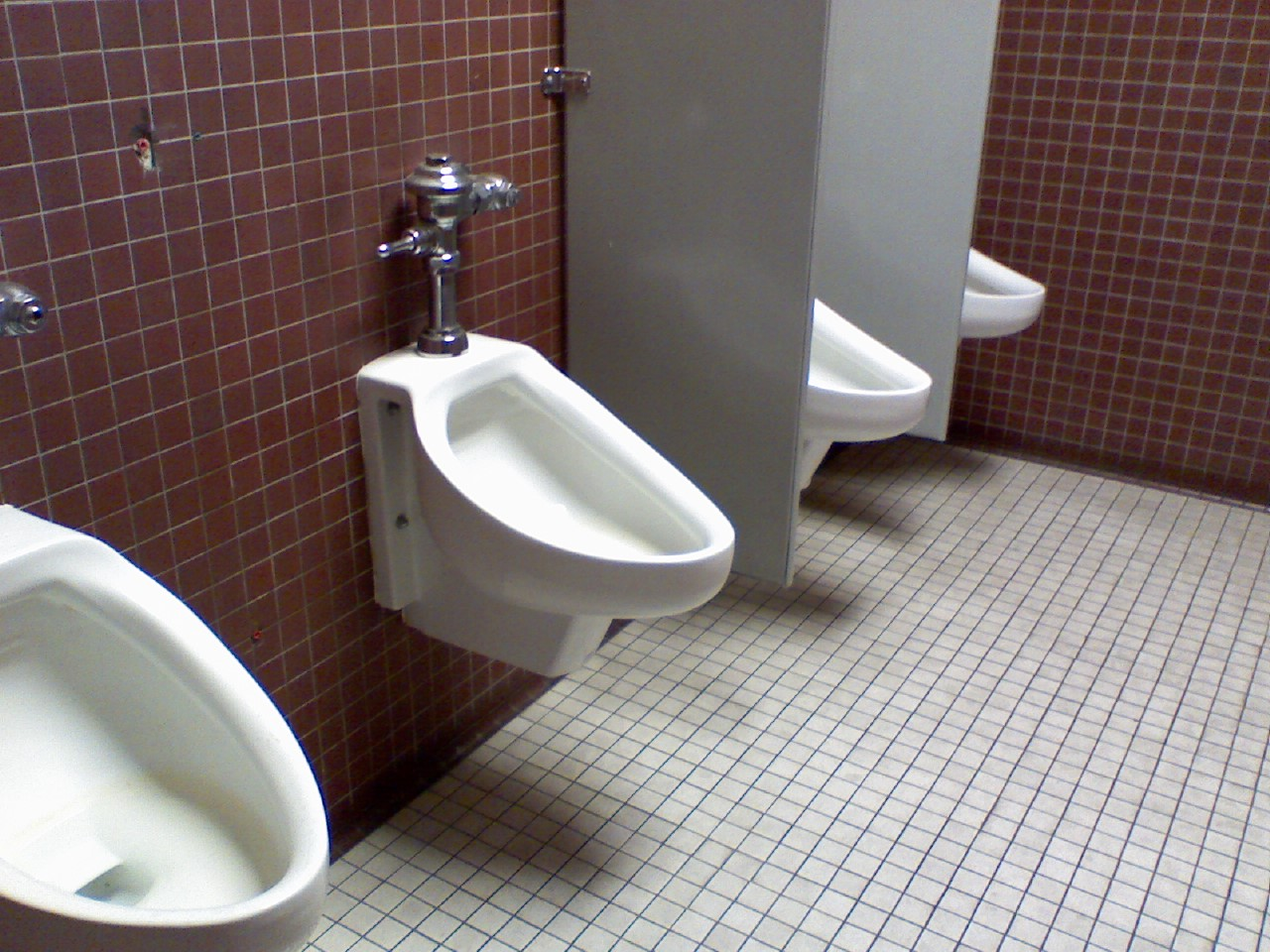
Women's restroom

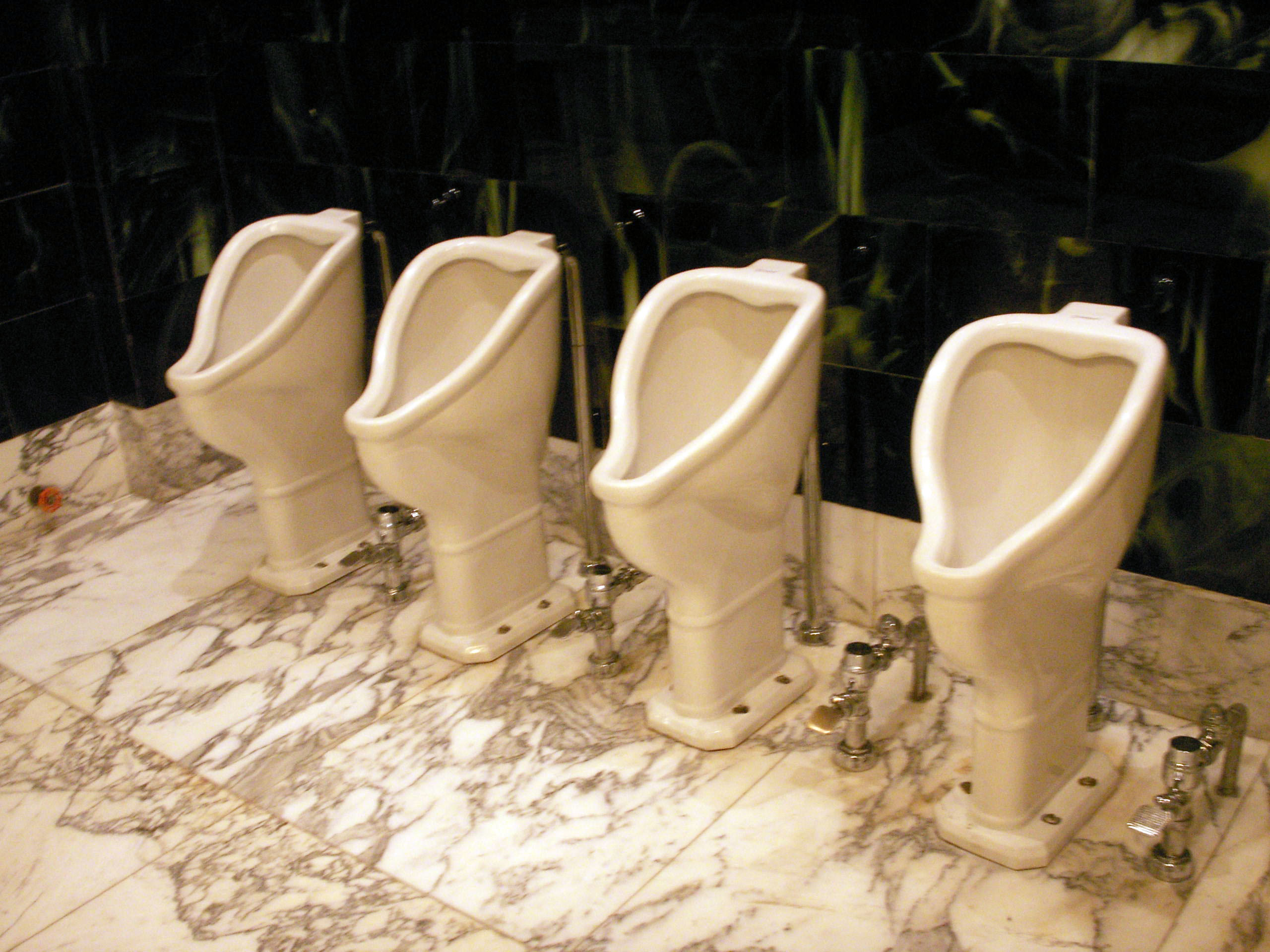
Female urinals in Mexico

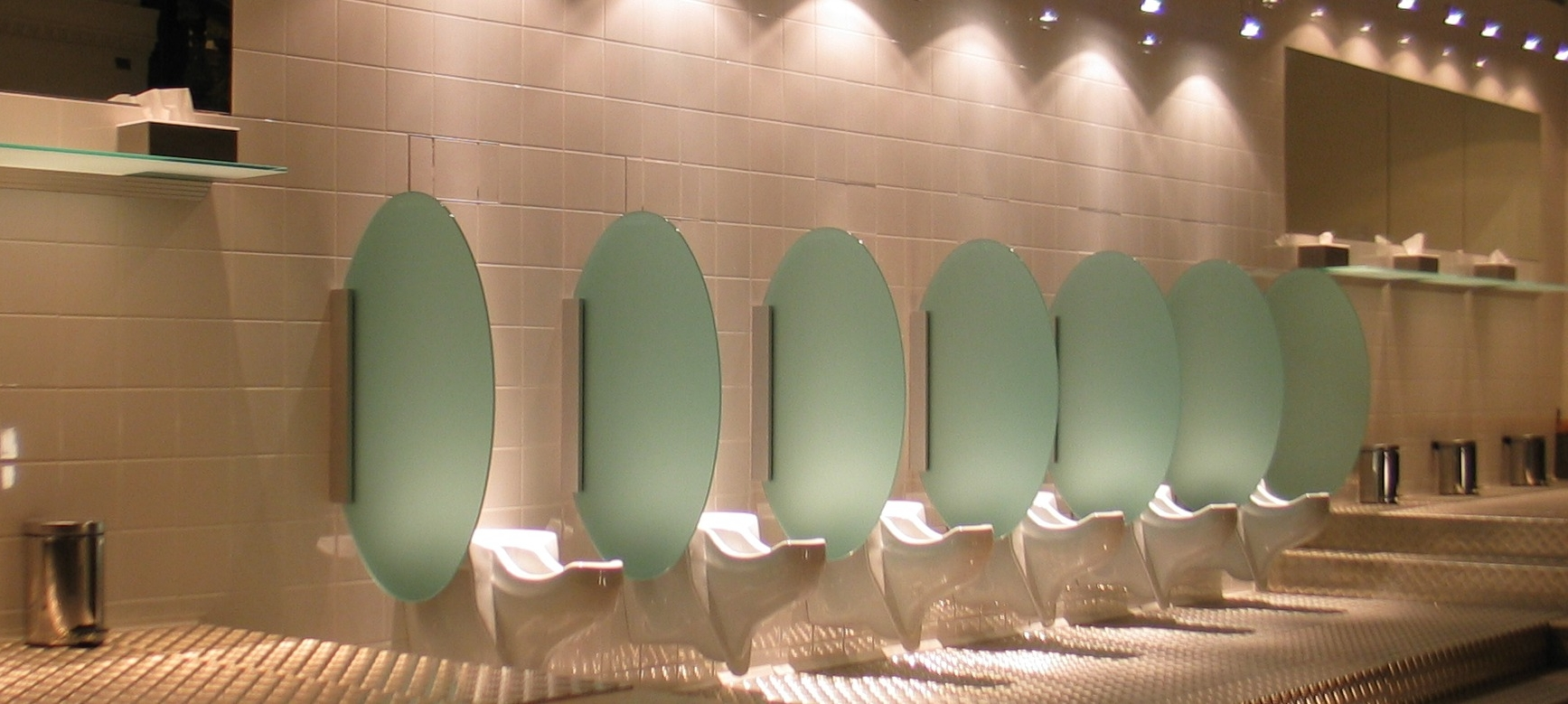
Modern urinals for women

== History ==
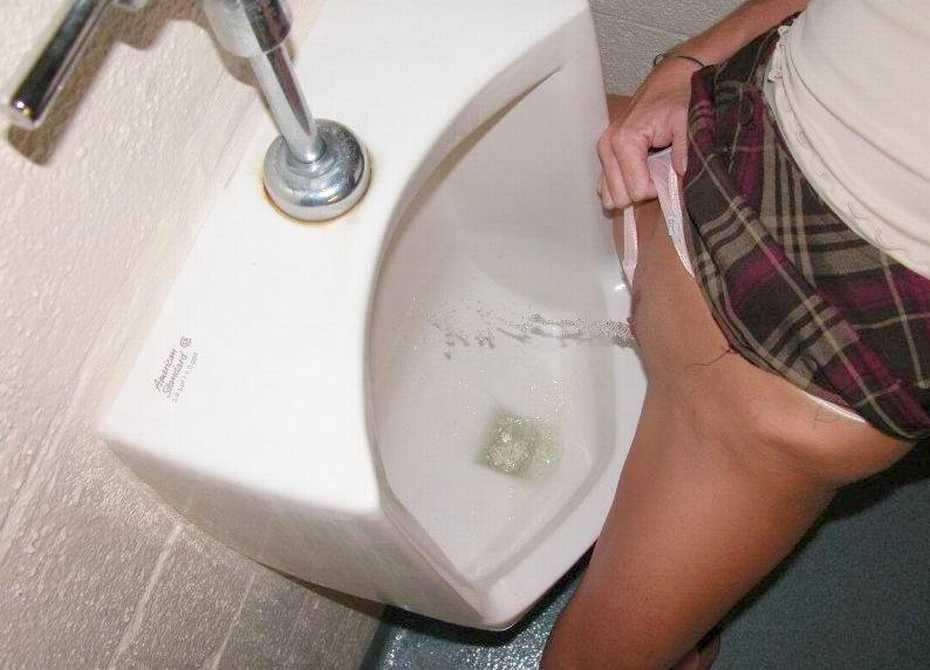
A woman urinating into a male urinal in a standing position, without using a device.

It is possible for a woman to aim her urine from a standing position without using a device. This was the norm in much earlier times, and standing to urinate was commonplace in certain cultures and situations, but this practice is no longer the norm in Western society. Changes to women's clothing in the twentieth century made the use of urination aids practical for women who wanted to urinate while standing.

Disposable female urination devices were patented as far back as 1922. The "Sanitary Protector" filed for in August 1918 by Edyth Lacy, specifies a "cheap device ...[to be] used but once, being especially suitable as a sanitary device in public toilet rooms." She notes that it is "accordingly unnecessary for the user to sit upon the closet seat; and the urine is led off without danger of soiling the clothes of the user or the closet". It was to be "made of a cheap readily destructible material, such as stiff paper, which can be readily disposed of after its use".

A similar device was patented in 1956: "an efficient urine conductor for use by females eliminating all need for contacting a toilet facility...usable while in a comfortable, erect standing position". Another half a dozen devices with the same basic purpose and form were patented by the end of the century.

The Urinelle, which originates from France, appeared in 1996 and was the first to have mainstream manufacturing.

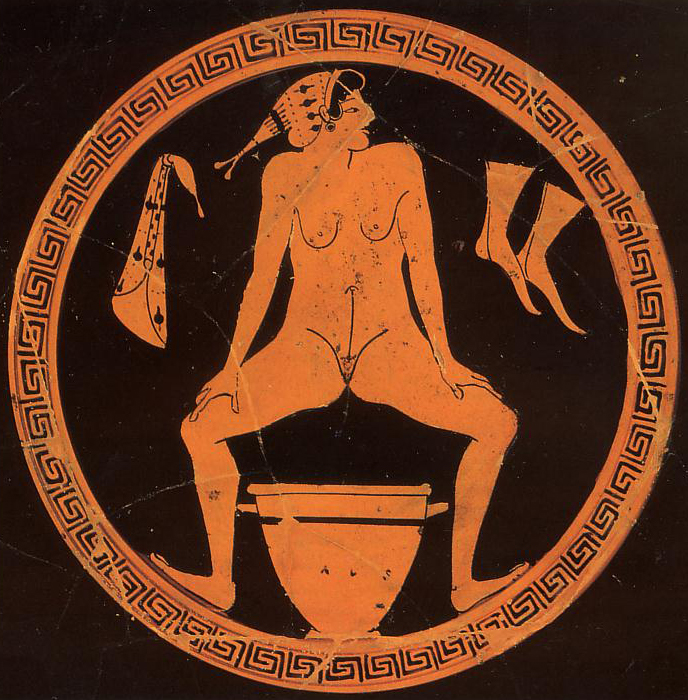
Greek hetaera urinates into skyphos (c. 480 BCE)

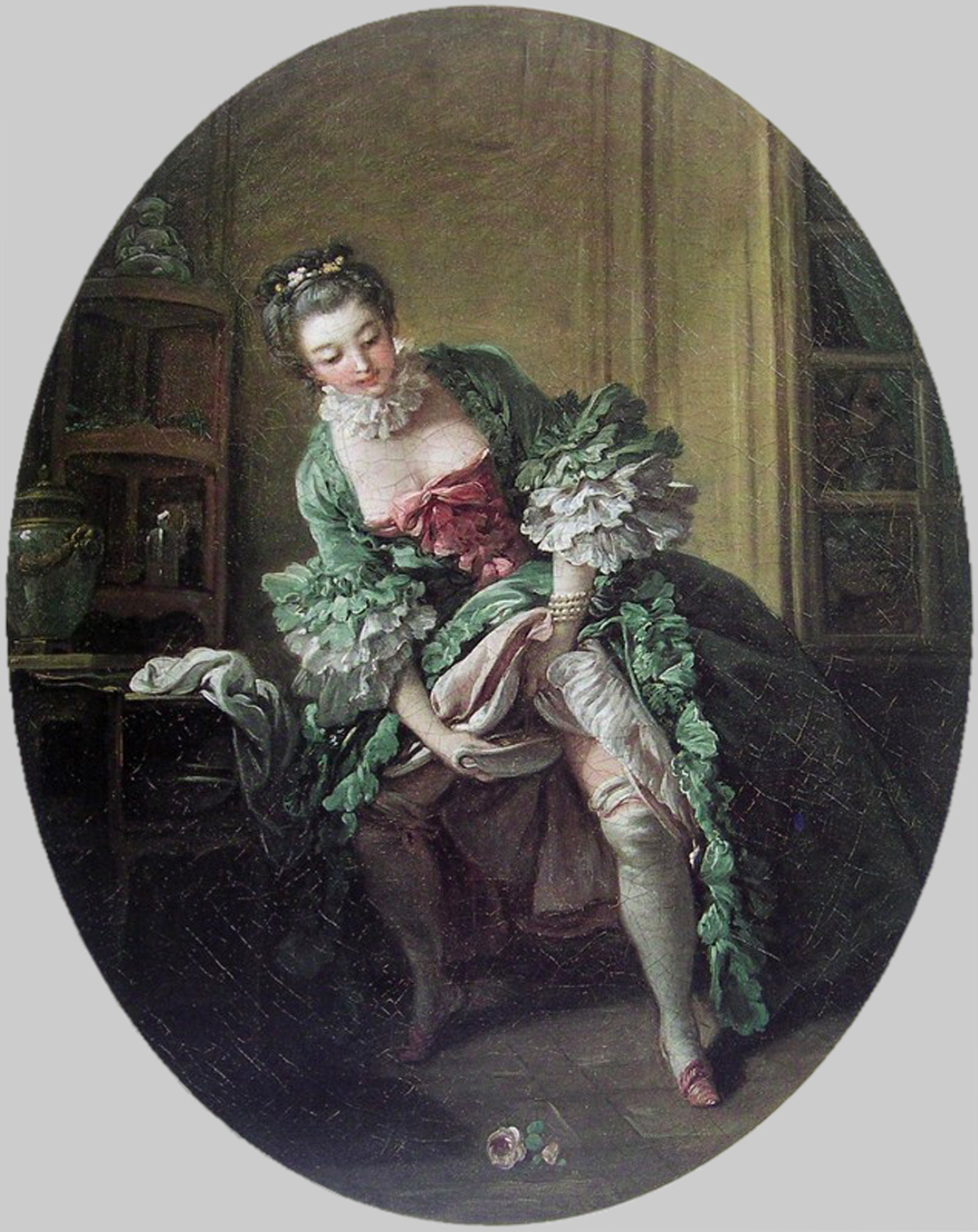
18th-century woman stands while urinating into chamber pot

== See also ==
- Pollee
- Whizzinator
