= Ralf Obergfell =

German photographer, author, film producer and activist

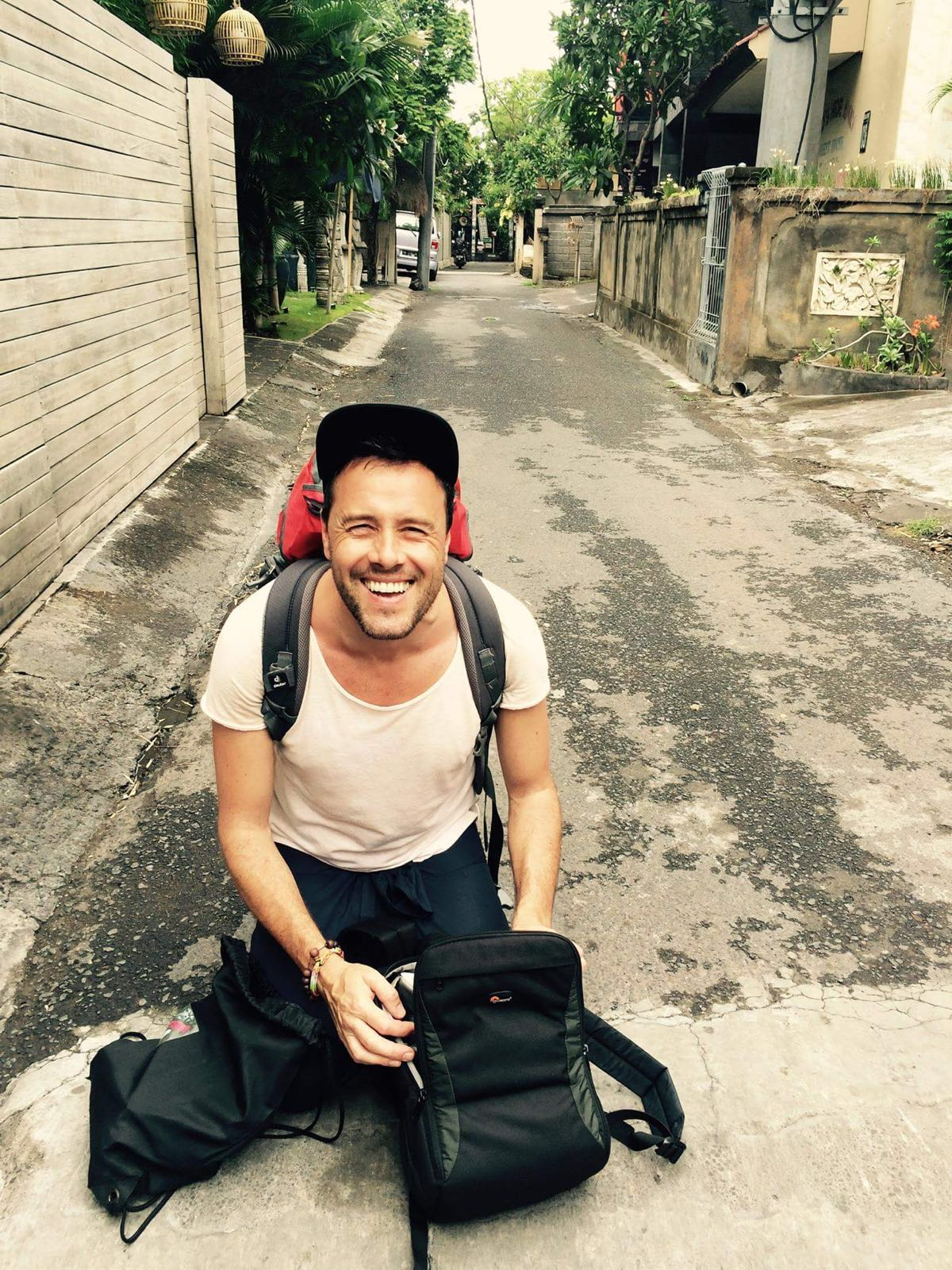
- Born: Ralf Obergfell; Freiburg, Germany
- Education: University of the Arts London (London College of Printing), London
- Known for: photography
- Notable work: Last Stop Routemasters, Gutterslut, Beautiful Freaks, Urak Lawoi, Poikas
- Awards: Permanent Archival (British Library)
- Website: www.ralfobergfell.com

Ralf Obergfell is a German-born artist, author and activist known for his long-term projects dealing with youth, change and transformation of his subjects over extended periods.

== Biography ==
Obergfell was born in Freiburg, Germany and grew up in nearby Staufen im Breisgau. He lived in London from 1991 to 2010 where he trained at the University of the Arts London, gaining his bachelor of arts in 1999. Obergfell lives and works in Berlin.

=== London ===
==== Last Stop Routemasters (2004–2008) ====
Obergfell lived in London from 1991 to 2010. In 2004, he joined Photodebut, a London-based collective of twenty-five emerging photographic artists. His work later appeared in Case Study, an art photography volume released by the collective. His first solo exhibition Last Stop: Routemasters, focusing on design, cultural and social aspects of the AEC Routemaster, was shown at the London Transport Museum in 2008, accompanied by an interactive website which was later permanently archived for preservation by the British Library. Critical response to the exhibition and associated multimedia projects was positive, with Time Out London describing it as "a plumbline to the reservoir of emotions associated with the [Routemaster]." The eponymous book accompanying the exhibition was later nominated for the London And/Or Photography Book Prize. Photos from the series also appeared in the book Cult Masterpieces: Icons of Our Generation, by Dirk Alt and Birgit Niefanger.

In 2005, BBC broadcaster Robert Elms said of the style of the photography in Last Stop Routemasters, 'it's beautiful [...] it's almost bus porn'. The project was described in ArtReview as '[a]n invaluable account of what some say is the greatest bus on earth'. The project was also reviewed positively in Time Out London where it was called '[a] fascinating set of photographs' and was featured in the magazine's "Critic's Choice" section in June 2008. The reviewer for Obergfell's hometown newspaper, the Badische Zeitung wrote that 'the photographs have a timeless quality and will serve as an important reminder for generations to come'.

==== Gutterslut (2007–2014) ====
Working in creative collaboration with artist Jonny Woo and DJs Per QX and Nic Fisher, Obergfell co-founded the LGBTQIA+ club event Gutterslut in London during this period. Gutterslut was later referred to by The Guardian as "an East London staple". Time Out London described it as "East London's most hedonistic polysexual tranny bash". Gutterslut was attended by partygoers, drag artists and celebrities including the Pet Shop Boys whose singer Neil Tennant said of the party: "'These days, we often go to Berghain [the infamous Berlin club] on a Sunday lunchtime, or Gutterslut in east London. [...] I personally like crazy nights with ridiculous drag queens, not people taking photos of the DJ all night.'" Images of Gutterslut events appear in the book New club Kids: London Party Fashion in the Noughties by Oggy Yordanov.

In the summer of 2012, Obergfell, together with Trailer Trash and his fellow Gutterslut organisers, hosted the Big Top stage at Lovebox Festival in Victoria Park, London, with a lineup that included Tiga, James Murphy, Pat Mahoney of LCD Soundsystem, Ivan Smagghe and headliner DJ Hell. Gutterslut hosted artists DJ Hell and Felix da Housecat at XOYO in London in 2014. From 2010 Until 2013, Obergfell continued to hold Gutterslut events at the Berlin clubs Sisyphos, Vögelchen (formerly Hubertuslounge) and Chalet.

==== Beautiful Freaks (2005–2010) ====
Obergfell's involvement in Gutterslut significantly influenced his work as a photographer. During this period, Obergfell began to experiment with artistic portrait photography. Working with installation artist Tony Hornecker, he created his second solo exhibition, Beautiful Freaks, in 2009, which was first shown at the Dalston Superstore with photographs featuring drag artists who appeared at East London nightclubs around that time.

In an interview with i-D magazine, Obergfell described the project as "a portraiture series and a tribute to our friends, some of London's most iconic creatures of the night." The show was later selected to be displayed at the Royal College of Art in London as part of the Gender and Performance group show. In 2020, photographs from the series were included in the photography anthology New Queer Photography edited by Benjamin Wolbergs. In 2024, the entire series was included in the exhibition "Love, Lust & Freedom" at the Kunstmuseum Brandts in Odense, Denmark as part of the Copenhagen Photo Festival.

=== Southeast Asia ===
==== Urak Lawoi (2004–2017) ====
Starting in 2004, Obergfell has regularly worked in Southeast Asia, creating photographic travelogues and working on photojournalistic projects in Indonesia (Bali, Borneo), Malaysia, Vietnam, Thailand, Myanmar and Cambodia. He was photographing at sea on a fishing boat when the 2004 Indian Ocean earthquake and tsunami occurred. The boat was nearly capsized by the tidal wave. Obergfell's storytelling and photography related to this incident have been featured in The Guardian and BBC World Service radio programme Outlook.

Documentary photographs taken by Obergfell of the Urak Lawoi were used in the 2007 UNESCO study The Urak Lawoi' of the Adang Archipelago, Thailand by Supin Wongbusarakum. Obergfell collected his photographs taken throughout the region for an exhibition called Urak Lawoi. Selections from the collection were shown in Berlin in 2016.

The photograph "Little Drummer Boy" from the Urak Lawoi series received an Honorable Mention in the Farmani Group's International Photography Awards.

=== Berlin ===
In 2010 Obergfell moved to Berlin when his long-time collaborator Tony Honecker became a resident artist at the Prinzessinnengarten where he staged installation art under the name Pale Blue Door.

Obergfell opened his photographic studio in Neukölln in 2010. He revived his Beautiful Freaks exhibition in 2012 in Berlin, which received positive reviews in both local and international press. The Berliner Zeitung referred to the exhibition as "twisted and wonderful".

Until 2013, Obergfell continued to hold Gutterslut events, including CTM Festival and events at Berlin clubs Lovelite, Sisyphos, Vögelchen (formerly Hubertuslounge) and Chalet.

Obergfell revisited his collaboration with installation artist Tony Hornecker in London in August 2019 to host a retrospective exhibition entitled "The End of an Era: Once upon a Time in Glebe Road."

In 2021, a retrospective of photography by Obergfell appeared in online LGBTQ+ culture magazine PINK.LIFE, including portraits as well as abstract work. The same year, online art magazine Containerlove published an editorial with a collection of recent work by Obergfell.

==== Poikas (2012–2017) ====
Obergfell's Poikas focuses on artistic portrait photography of men, using amateur models. The series uses impromptu, experimental lighting and intimate close-ups. It examines expressions of everyday masculinity and sexuality in contemporary Berlin, in the context of late-capitalism and ongoing gentrification. Selections from the series were included in the exhibition Boys! Boys! Boys! at The Little Black Gallery in London in 2018, curated by Paddle8. Obergfell's photo "Blue Boy" appeared in the book that accompanied the Boys! Boys! Boys! exhibition, with proceeds benefiting the Elton John AIDS Foundation.

==== Berlin Icons (2017–present) ====
In 2017, Obergfell and his long-time collaborator, writer Steffi Weiss, announced a new project entitled Berliner Ikonen (Berlin Icons), a combination of photography and text focusing on iconic Berlin people and places adapting to the city's ongoing gentrification. Subjects included in the project include Berlin musical artist Gudrun Gut, traditional brush makers Bürsten Schröder (makers of an anal brush), Berlin public urinals (known locally as Cafe Achteck or "octagonal cafes"), and the Berlin Lipstick Museum. A conceptual exhibition based on the series debuted in 2023 during the European Month of Photography Berlin.

==== Ascension (2023) ====
In 2023, Obergfell produced the short film Ascension, which was filmed near his childhood home and features the debut film performance of his nephew, Jakob Obergfell. The film was selected for screening at numerous international film festivals and won the Best Cinematography Award at the 2023 Dubai Independent Film Festival and the Cinematography Achievement Award at the 2023 Hawaii International Film Festival.

== Publications ==
=== Publications by Obergfell ===
- Last Stop Routemasters. London: Routemasters, 2008. ISBN 9781859836101.

=== Publications with contributions by Obergfell ===
- New Queer Photography: Focus on the Margins. Kettler, 2020. Edited by Benjamin Wolbergs. ISBN 9781584237563.
- Boys, Boys, Boys!. teNeues, 2020. Edited by Ghislain Pascal. ISBN 9783961712526
- Photodebut: A Case Study. The Photographer's Office, 2009. Edited by Aaron Schuman, Alys Tomlinson, Hin Chua, Jan von Holleben, Karoline Hjorth, Lisa Barbe, Matt Burgess. ISBN 9780955447051
- Cult Masterpieces: Icons of Our Generation. Tectum, 2008. By Dirk Alt and Birgit Niefanger. ISBN 9789076886640

== Collections ==
Obergfell's work is held in the following permanent collection:

- British Library, London: The interactive website accompanying his Last Stop Routemasters exhibition and book
