= Pissoir =

Structure that provides screening of urinals

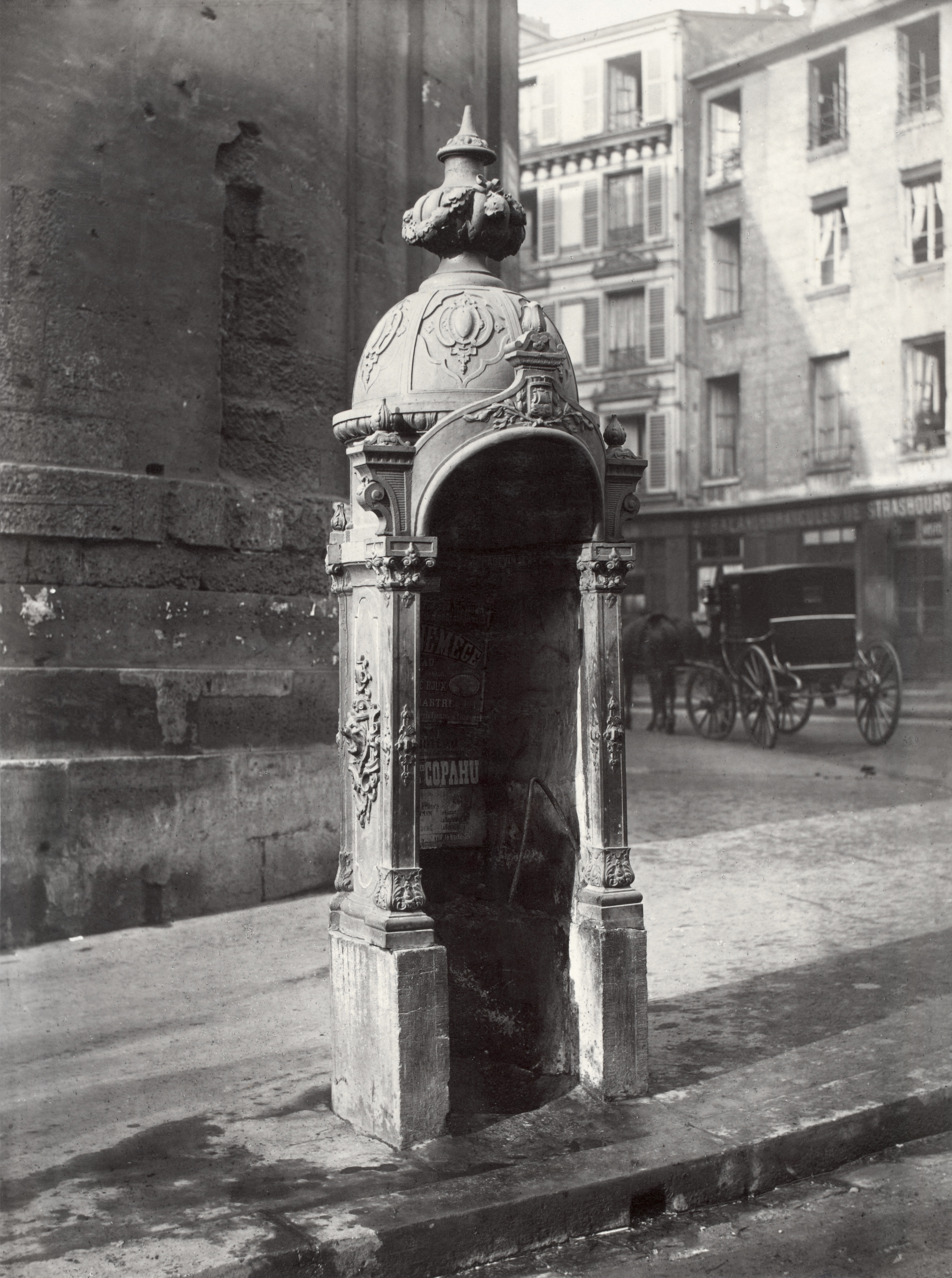
'Colonne Rambuteau', photographed 1865

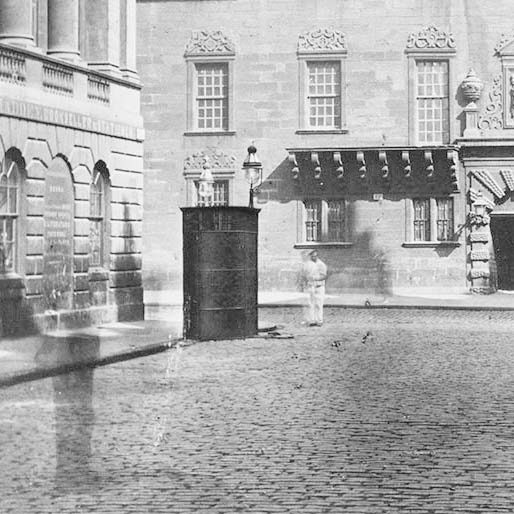
A cast iron urinal in College Street, Glasgow, installed 1850–54, photographed in 1866

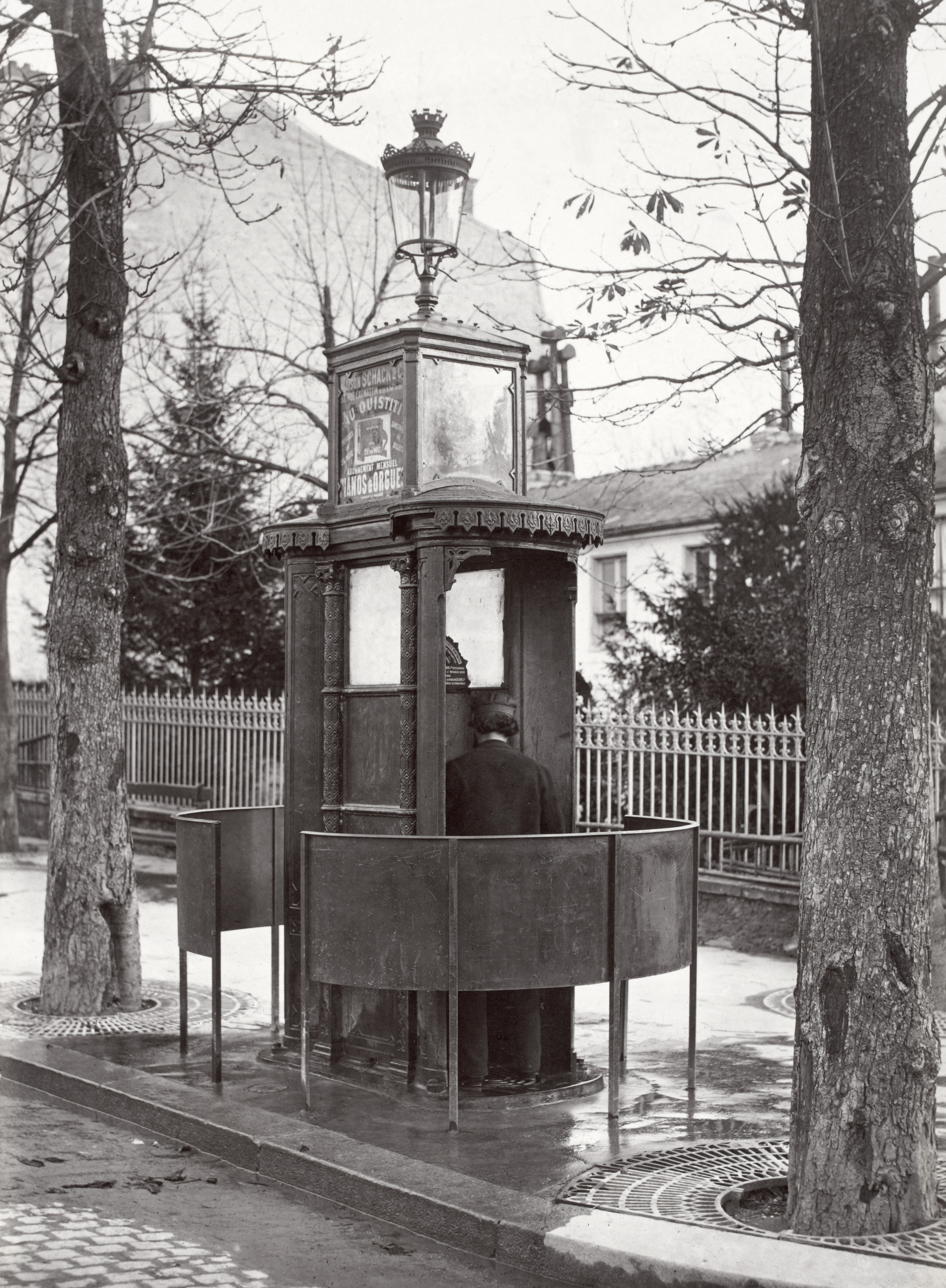
A later Paris pissoirs in cast iron, photographed c. 1865

A pissoir (also known in French as a vespasienne) is a French invention, common in Europe, that provides a urinal in public space with a lightweight structure. The availability of pissoirs aims to reduce urination onto buildings, sidewalks, or streets. They can be freestanding and without screening, with partial screening, or fully enclosed.

== Etymology ==
The name comes from Middle French, pisser, to urinate; itself from Old French pissier.

== History ==
In the spring of 1830, the city government of Paris decided to install the first public urinals on the major boulevards. They were put in place by the summer, but in July of the same year, many were destroyed through their use as materials for street barricades during the French Revolution of 1830.

The urinals were re-introduced in Paris after 1843, when over 400 were installed by Claude-Philibert Barthelot, comte de Rambuteau, the Préfet of the Department of the Seine. Having a simple cylindrical shape, built of masonry, open on the street side, and ornately decorated on the other side as well as the cap, they were popularly known as colonnes Rambuteau (Rambuteau columns).

In response, Rambuteau suggested the name vespasiennes, in reference to the 1st century Roman emperor Titus Flavius Vespasianus, who placed a tax on urine collected from public toilets for use in tanning. This is the usual term by which street urinals are known in the French speaking world, although pissoirs and pissotière are also in common use.

In Paris, the next version was a masonry column that allowed for the pasting of posters on the side facing the footpath, creating a tradition that continues to this day (as a Morris column, a column with an elaborate roof and without the urinal).

Cast iron urinals were developed in the United Kingdom, with the Scottish firm of Walter McFarlane and Company casting urinals at their Saracen Foundry and erecting the first at Paisley Road, Glasgow in October 1850. By the end of 1852, nearly 50 cast iron urinals had been installed in Glasgow, including designs with more than one stall. Unlike Rambuteau's columns, which were entirely open at the front, McFarlane's one-man urinals were designed with spiral cast iron screens that allowed the user to be hidden from sight, and his multi-stall urinals were completely hidden within ornate, modular cast iron panels. Three manufacturers in Glasgow, Walter Macfarlane & Co., George Smith (Sun Foundry) and James Allan Snr & Son (Elmbank Foundry), supplied the majority of cast iron urinals across Britain and exported them around the world, including Australia and Argentina.

Back in Paris, cast iron urinals were introduced as part of Baron Haussmann's remodelling of the city. A large variety of designs were produced in subsequent decades, housing two to 8 stalls, typically only screening the central portion of the user from public view, with the head and feet still visible. Screens were also added to Rambuteau columns. At the peak of their spread in the 1930s there were 1,230 pissoirs in Paris, but by 1966 their number had decreased to 329. From 1980 they were replaced systematically with new technology, a unisex, enclosed, automatically self-cleaning unit called the Sanisette. By 2006, only one historic pissoir remained, on Boulevard Arago.

In Berlin, the first pissoirs, in wood, were erected in 1863. In order to provide a design as distinguished as in other cities, several architectural design competitions were organised in 1847, 1865 and 1877. The last design, proposed by a city councillor, was the one adopted in 1878, a cast-iron octagonal structure with seven stalls and a peaked roof, known locally as a Café Achteck ("Octagon Cafe"). In common with British designs, they provided complete enclosure, and were provided with interior lighting. Their number increased to 142 by 1920, but there are now only about a dozen remaining in use.

A similar design was adopted in Vienna, though simpler, smaller and hexagonal. They were equipped with a novel "oil system", patented by Wilhelm Beetz in 1882, where a type of oil was used to neutralise odours, dispensing with the necessity for plumbing. About 15 are still in use, and one has been restored and set up as a display in the Vienna Technical Museum.

In central Amsterdam, there are about 35 pee curls, which consist of a raised metal screen that curls in a spiral enclosing a single urinal stall, including some two-person examples with the same details but a simpler shape. Though the design first emerged in the 1870s, an updated design by Joan van der Mey dates from 1916. All the remaining examples were restored in 2008.

Pissoirs of various sizes and designs, but mostly in patterned cast-iron, can still be found dotted across the UK, with a few in London, but especially in Birmingham and Bristol. A solitary example of Walter McFarlane's one-man spiral urinal remains in Thorn Park, Plymouth. A number have been restored and relocated to the grounds of various open-air museums and heritage railway lines.

Rectangular pissoirs, with elaborate patterned cast-iron panels, similar in design to some of the UK ones, were installed in the city of Sydney, Australia in 1880 and Melbourne, Australia, in the period 1903–1918. Of at least 40 that were made, nine remain in place and in use on the streets in and around central Melbourne, and have been classified by the National Trust since 1998.

In recent years, temporary pissoirs with multiple unscreened urinals around a central column have been introduced in the UK. A temporary pissoir for women called the "peeasy" is used in Switzerland.

== In popular culture ==
A pissoir was featured in the first scene of the 1967 James Bond spoof film Casino Royale.

A pissoir was also featured in a few episodes of the British WWII comedy series 'Allo 'Allo!, as a meeting place for René Artois (Nighthawk) and other members of the Resistance, and is accidentally blown up a few times, twice while Officer Crabtree is inside, and once with the Italian Captain Alberto Bertorelli.

Clochemerle, broadcast in the UK in 1972, starring Peter Ustinov and many others, depicts a rural French town's attempts to erect a public urinal.

== Plaskruis ==
A plaskruis is a pissoir designed in the Netherlands that is the same size as a portable toilet and provides four urinals per unit. They are not connected to the sewer system but have their own storage tank. They are commonly used for music festivals and other events, but some cities also use them on a regular basis to control public urination during busy nights. It was designed by Joost Carlier who works for Lowlands and other events. They were first used in 1991 during the "Monsters Of Rock" event in the Goffertpark.

== Gallery ==
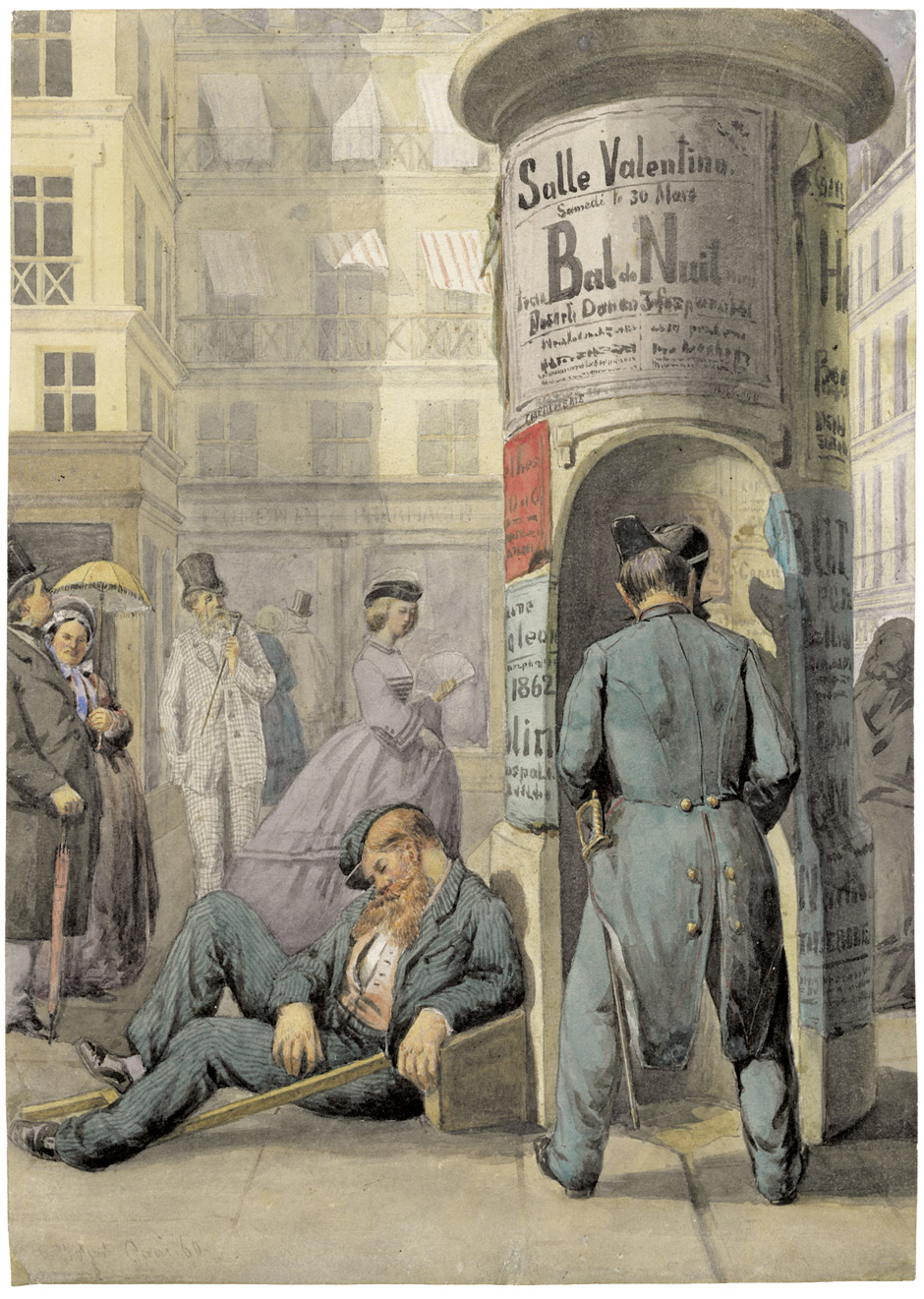
Colonnes Rambuteau, Paris, c. 1860

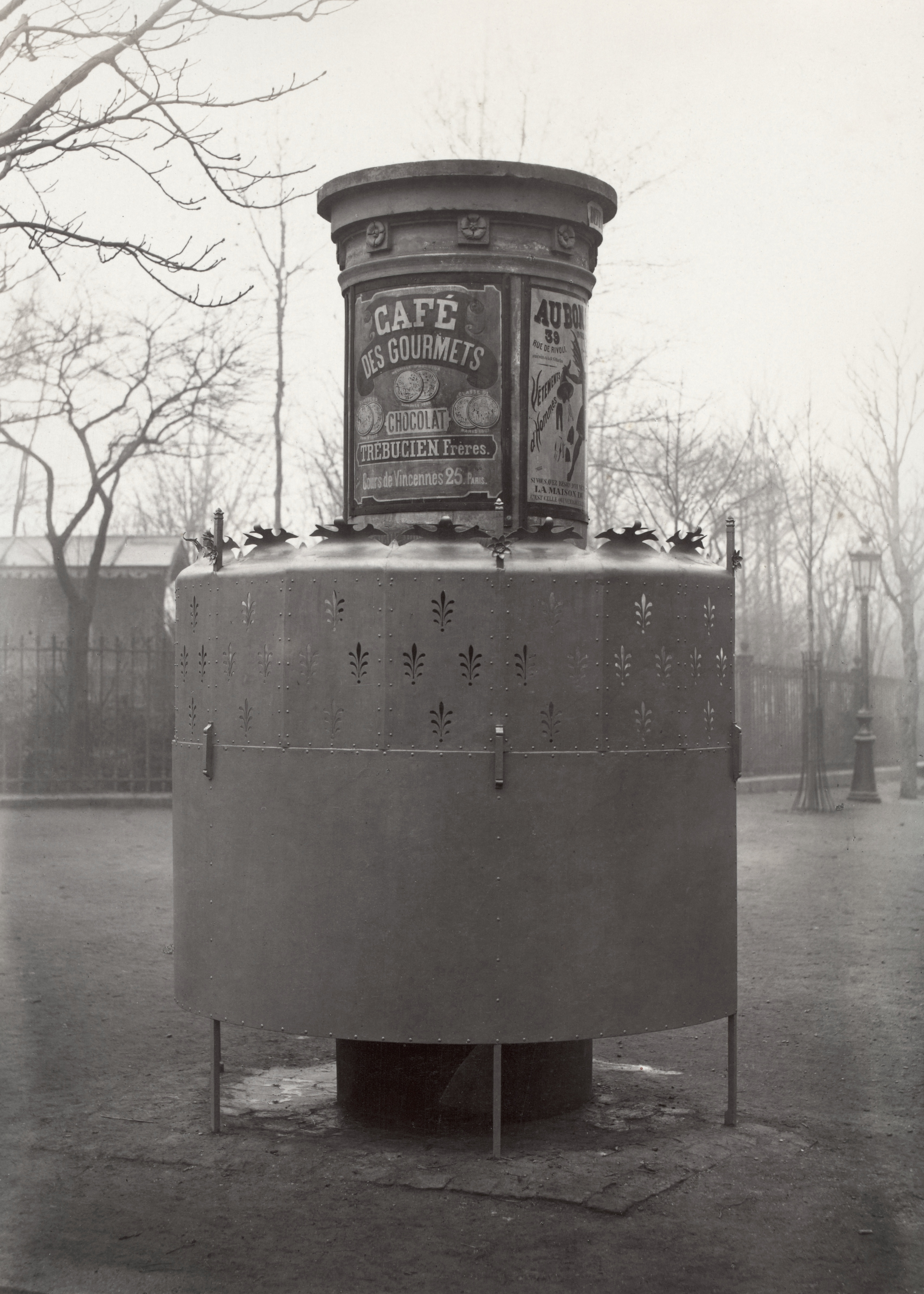
Colonnes Rambuteau with screen, Paris, c. 1865

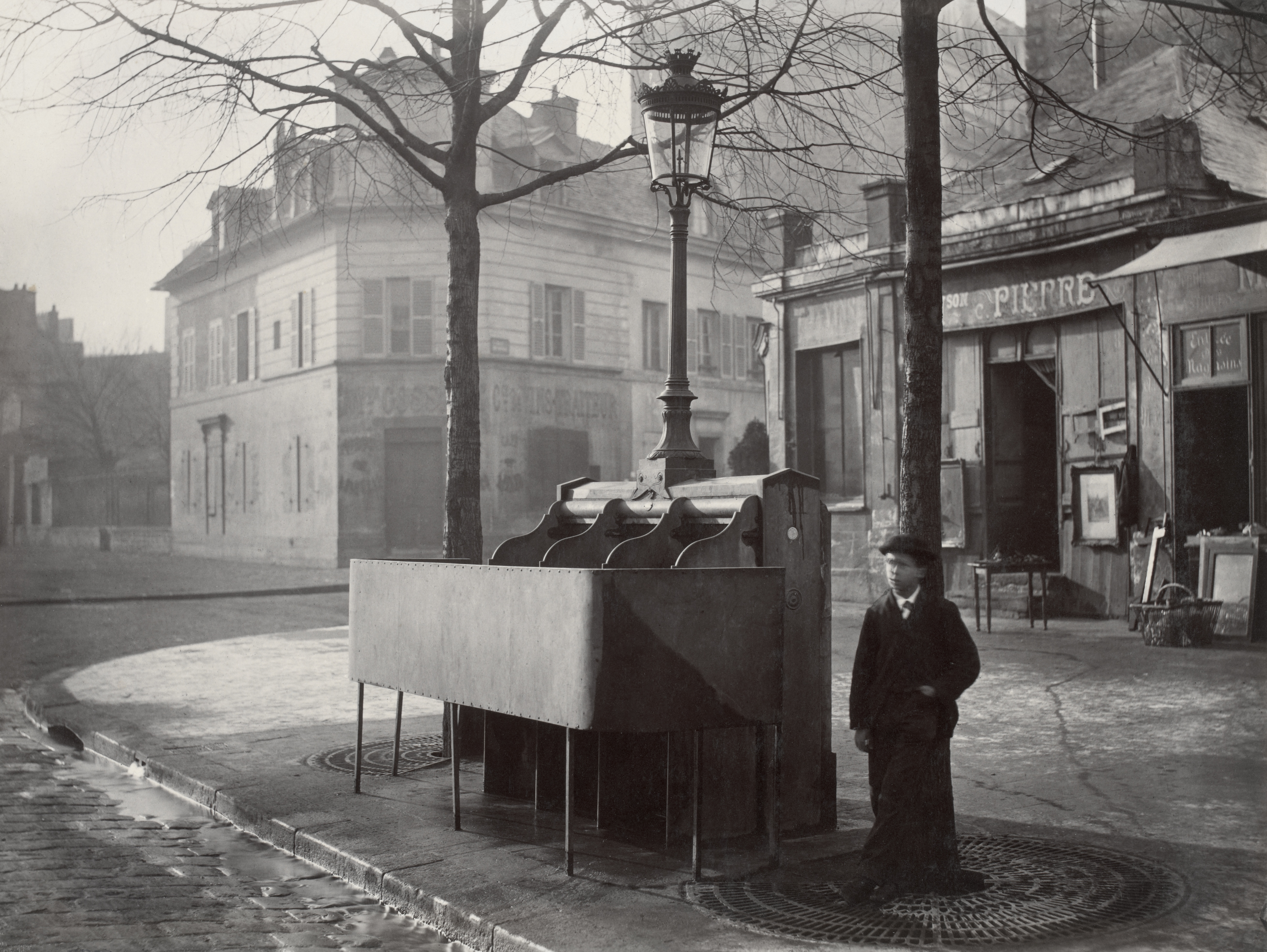
A pissoir with three stalls, Paris, c. 1865

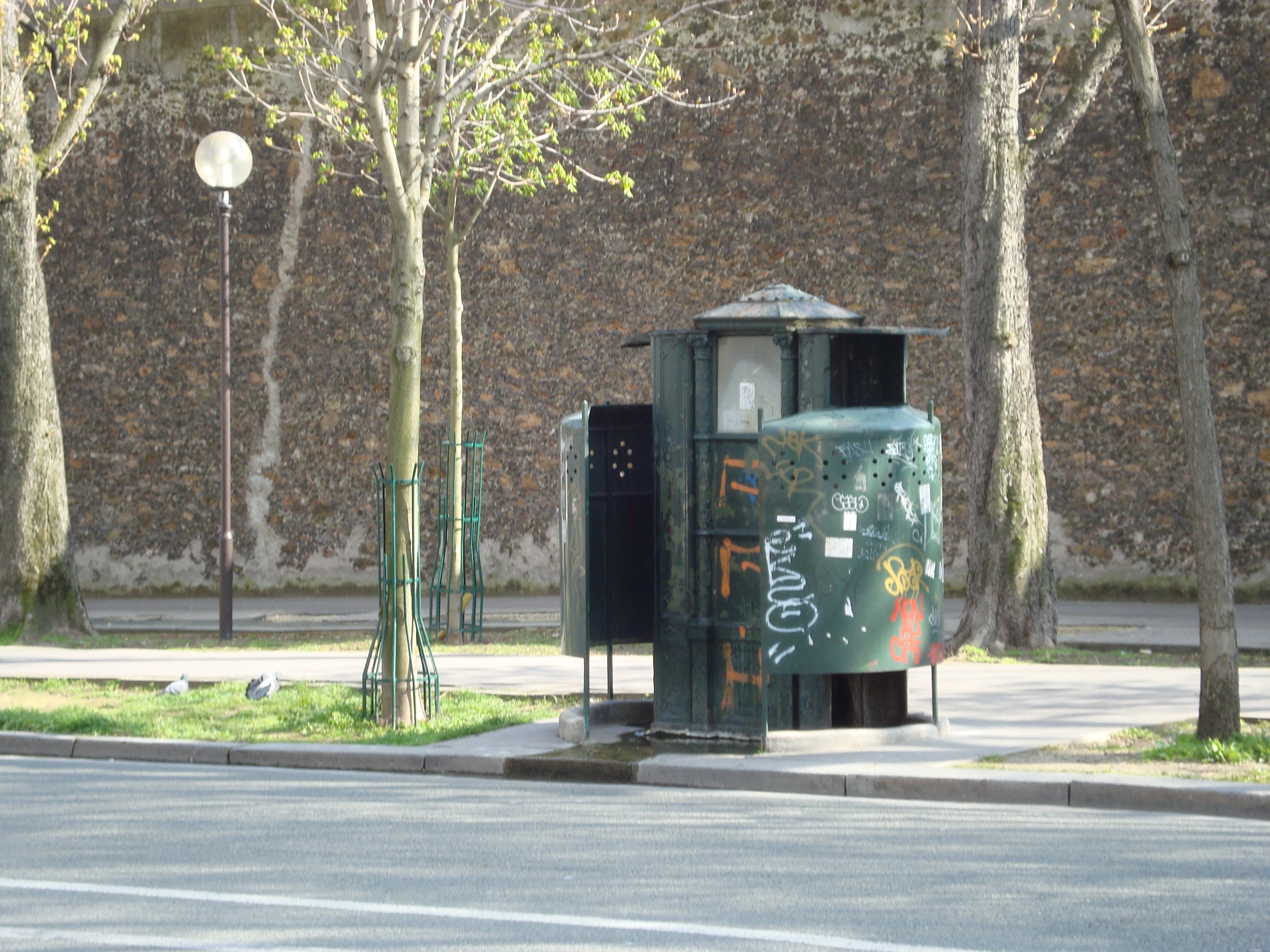
Vespasienne Arago, the only surviving Parisian pissoir.

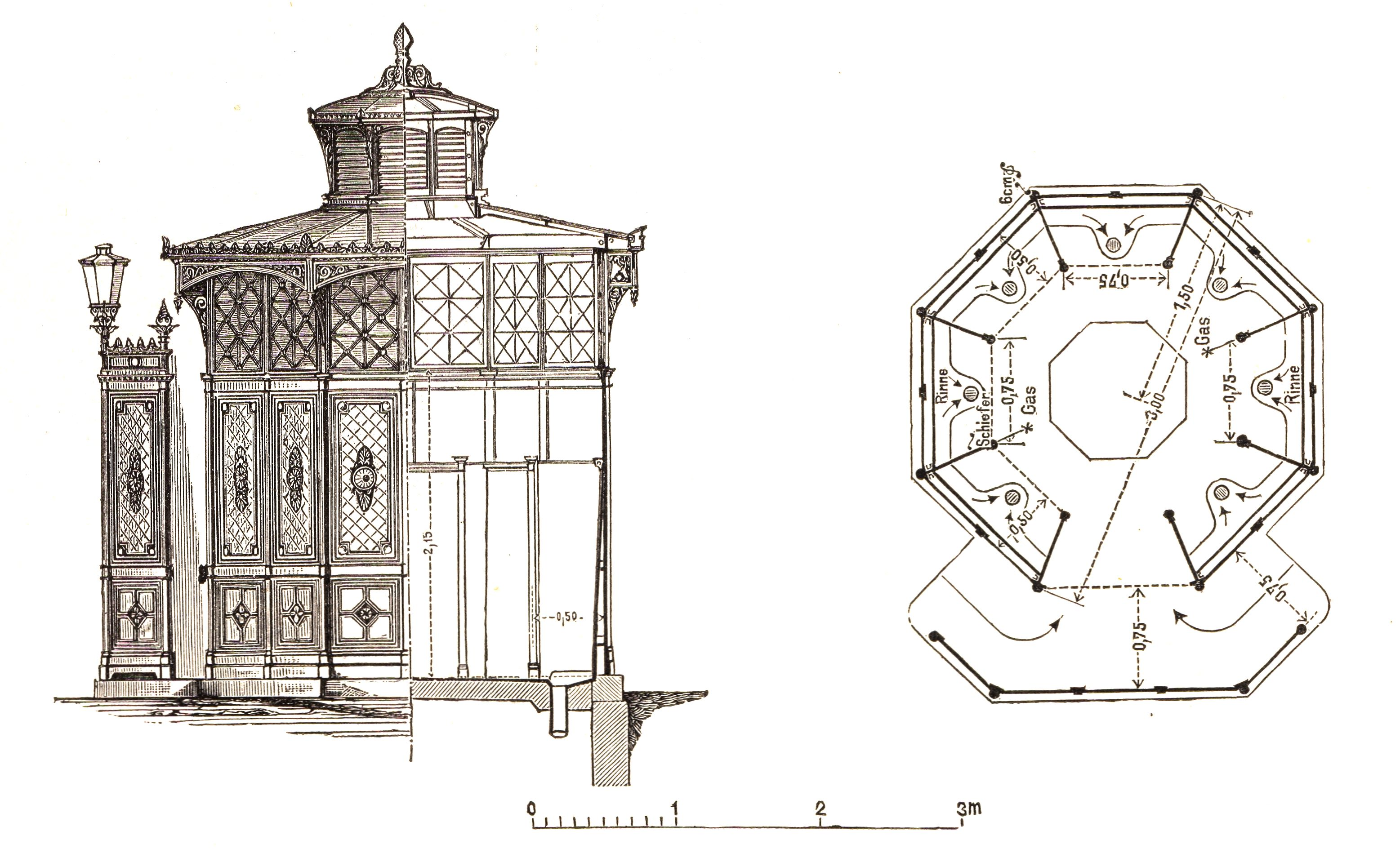
Elevation, section and plan drawings of an octagonal pissoir in Berlin, 1896

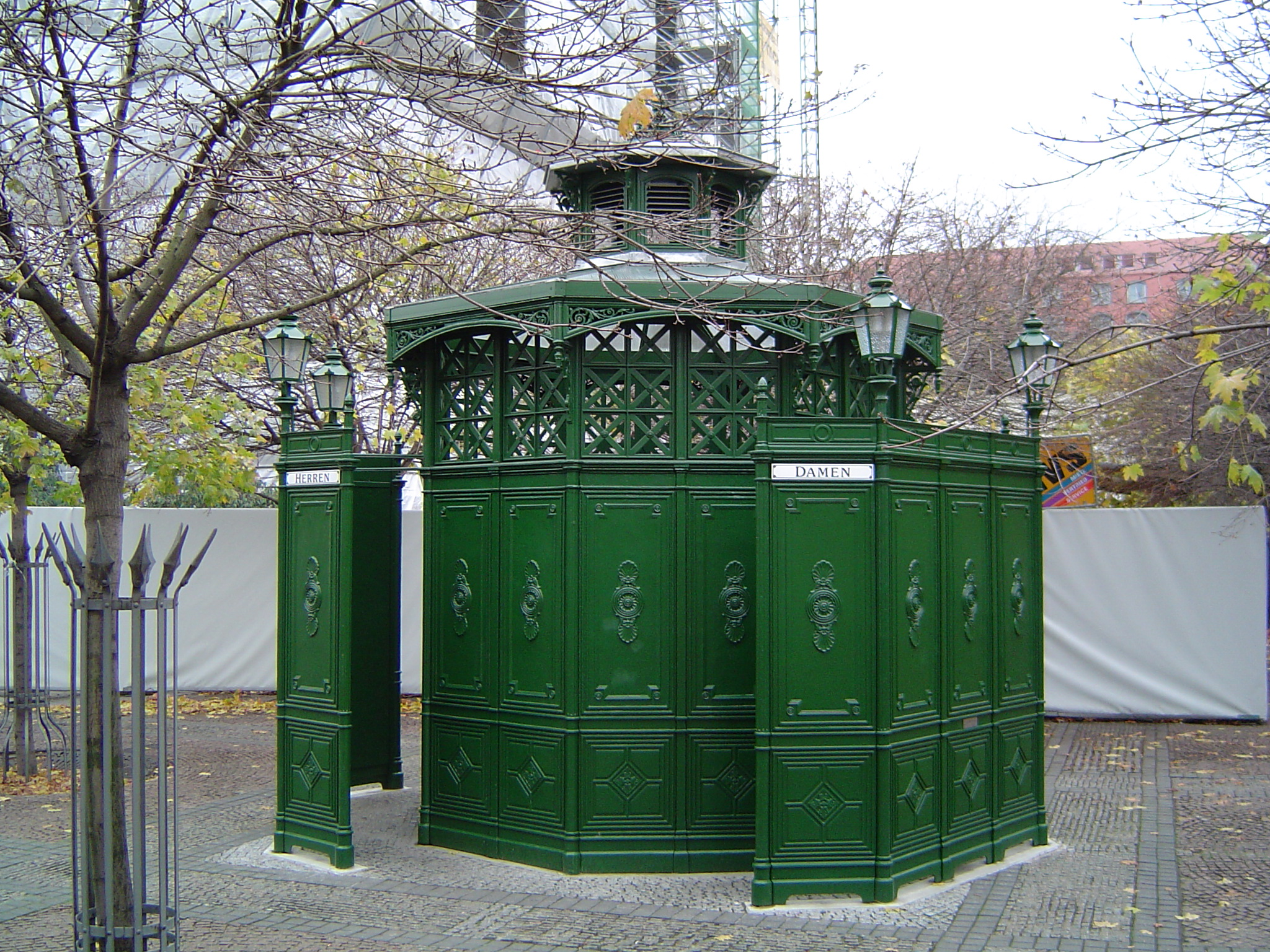
Cafe Achteck, Berlin, converted to male and female toilets

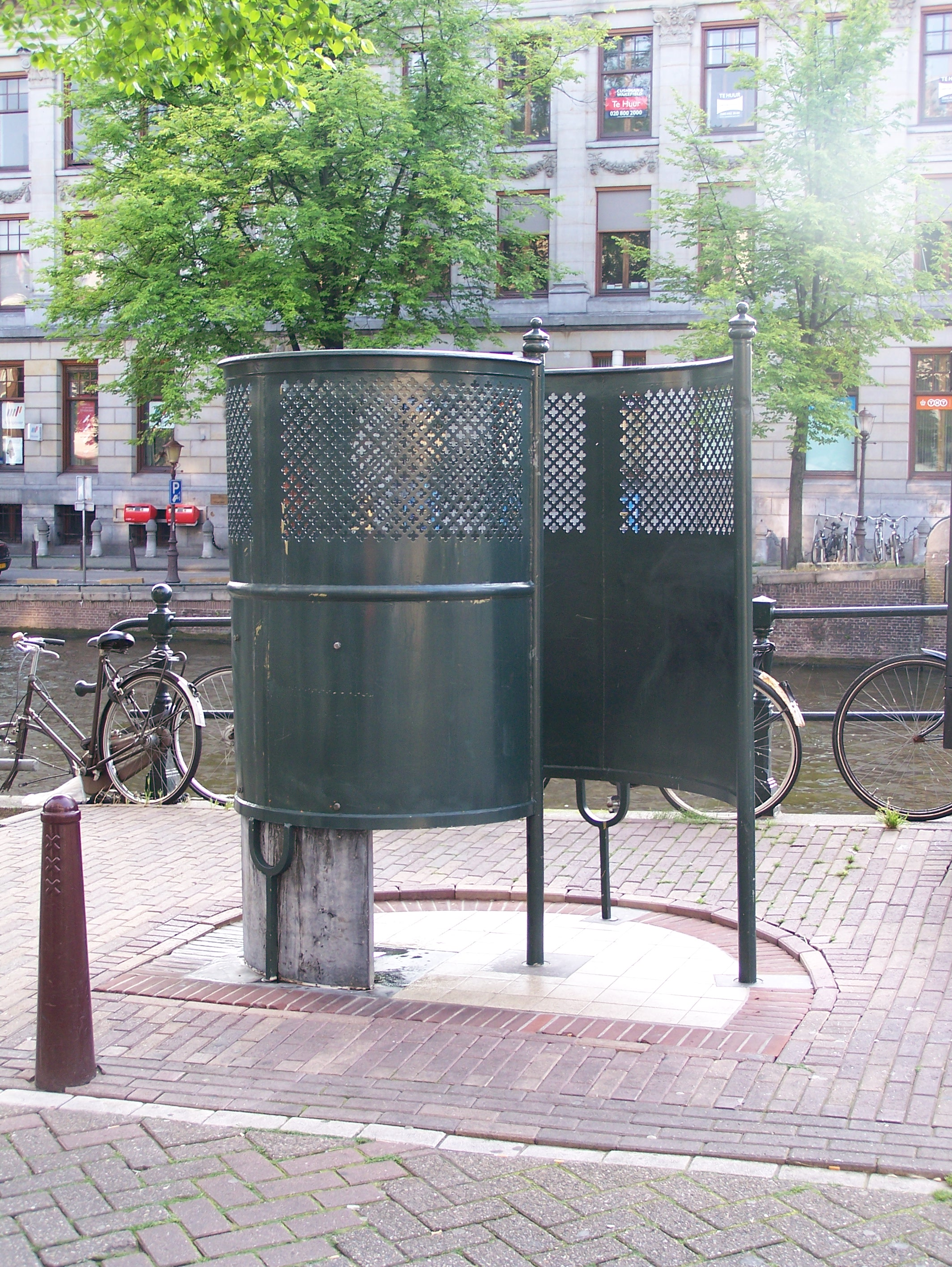
A plaskrul in Amsterdam

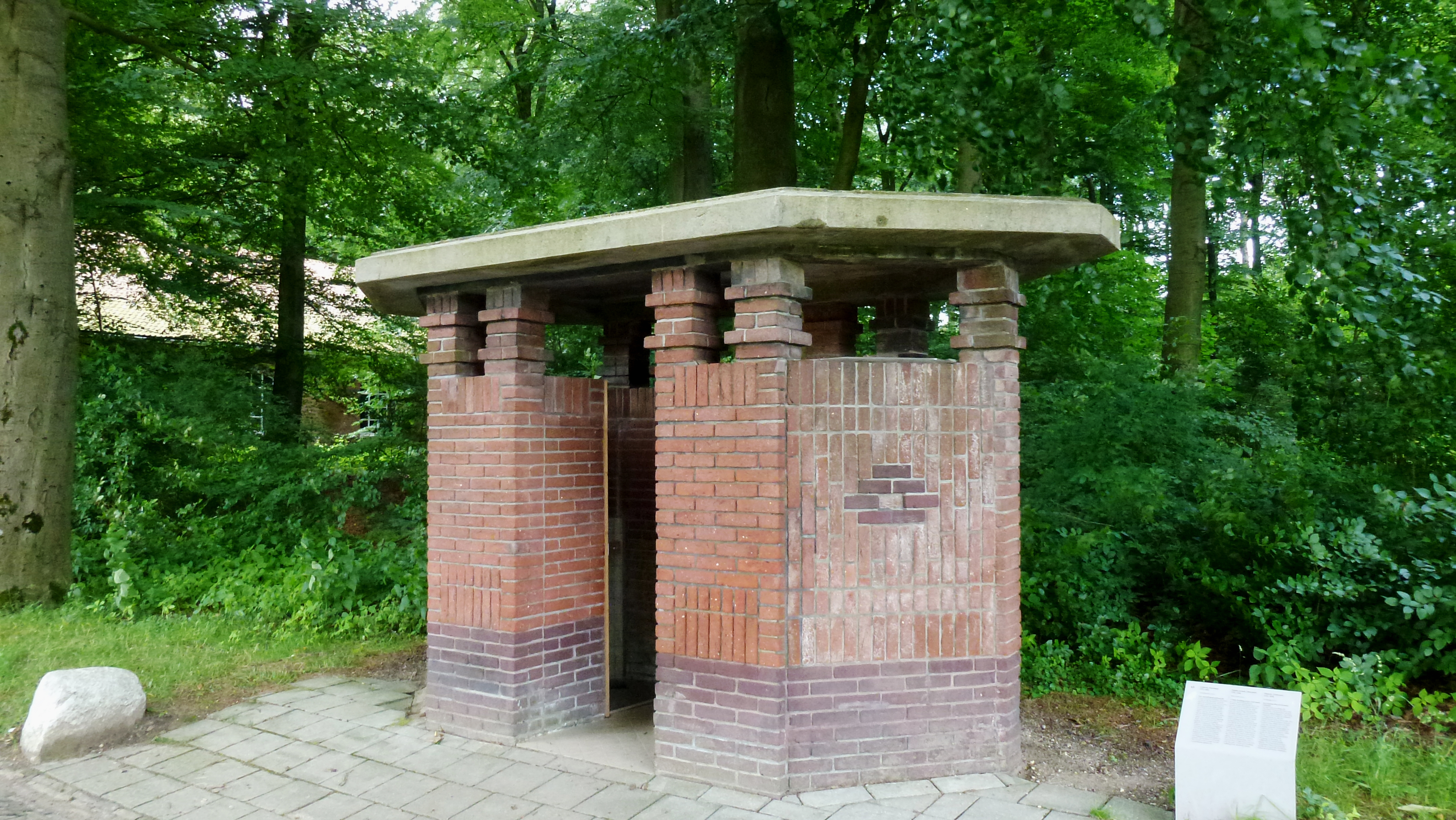
Brick pissoir, Deventer, Arnhem, Netherlands, 1923

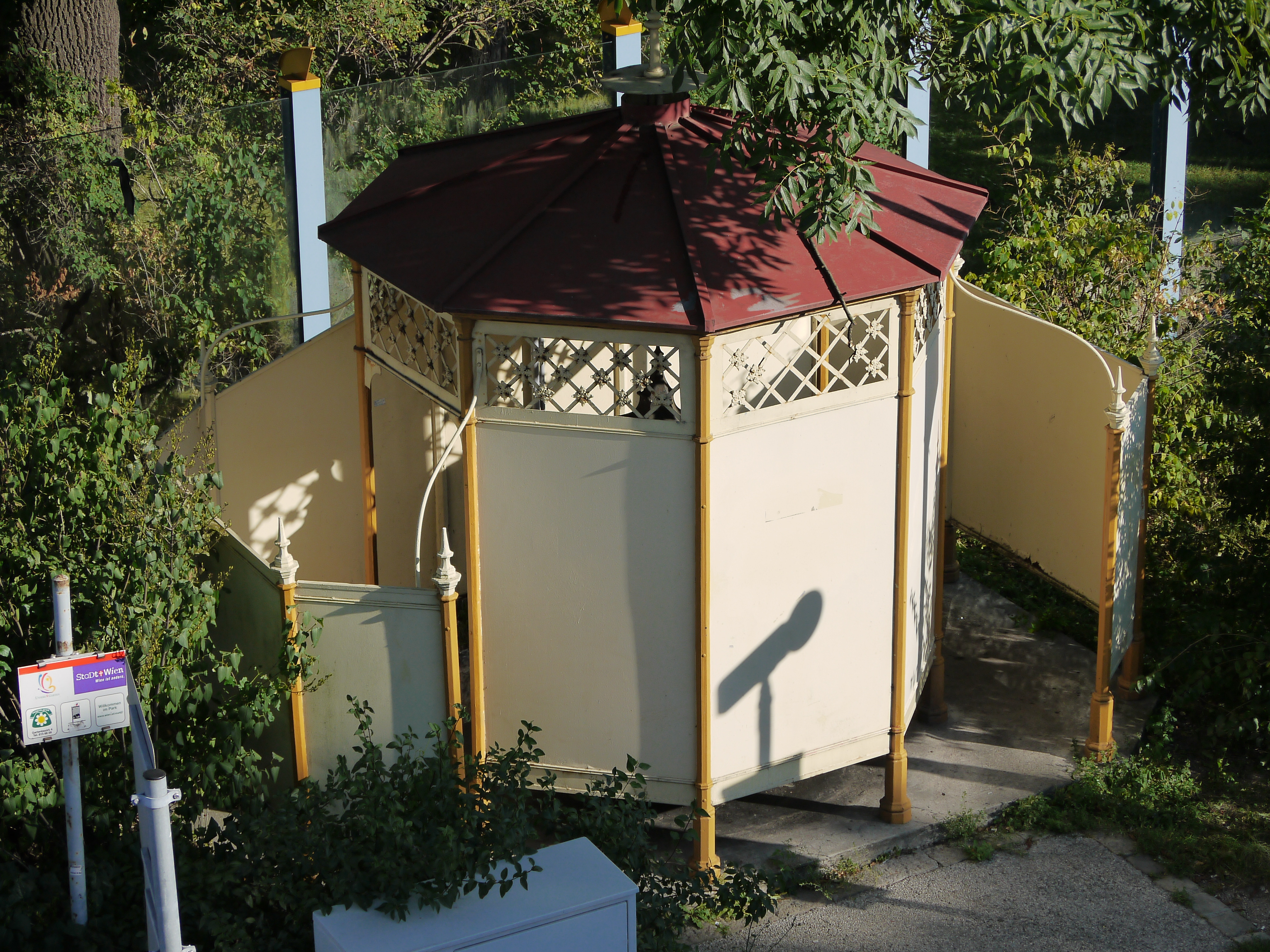
Pissoir, Hütteldorf, Vienna, 1936

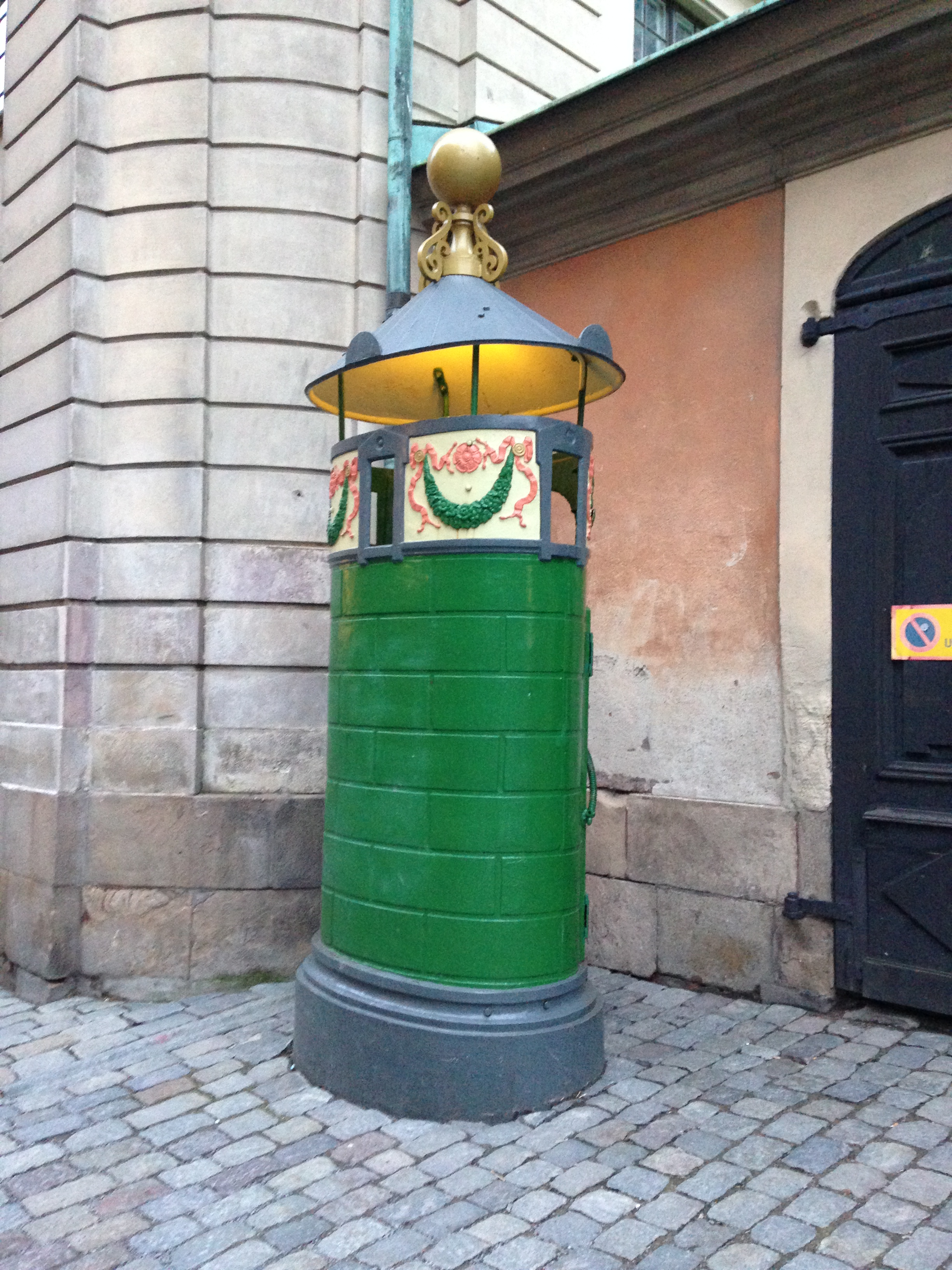
A pissoir close to the royal castle in Gamla Stan, Stockholm, Sweden

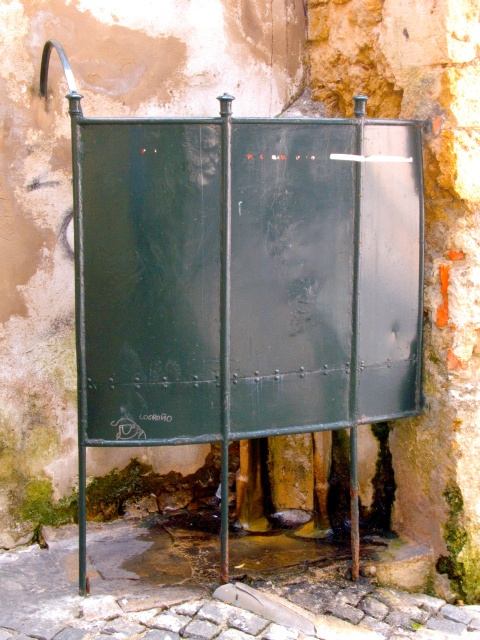
Pissoir in Lisbon

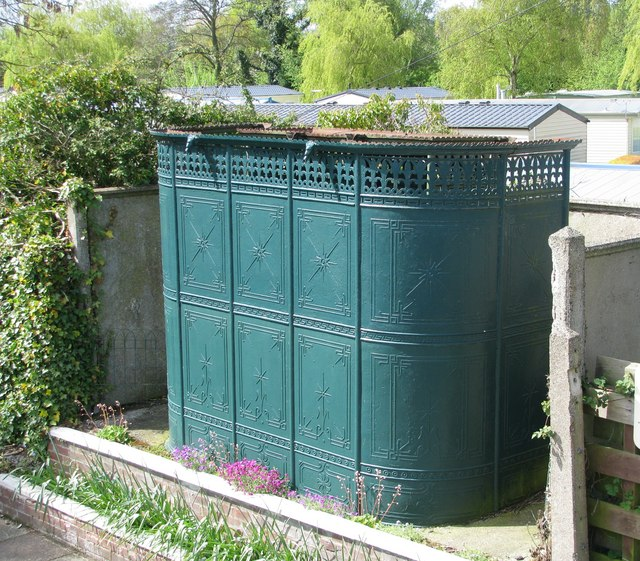
Historic cast-iron urinal at Colyford station, England

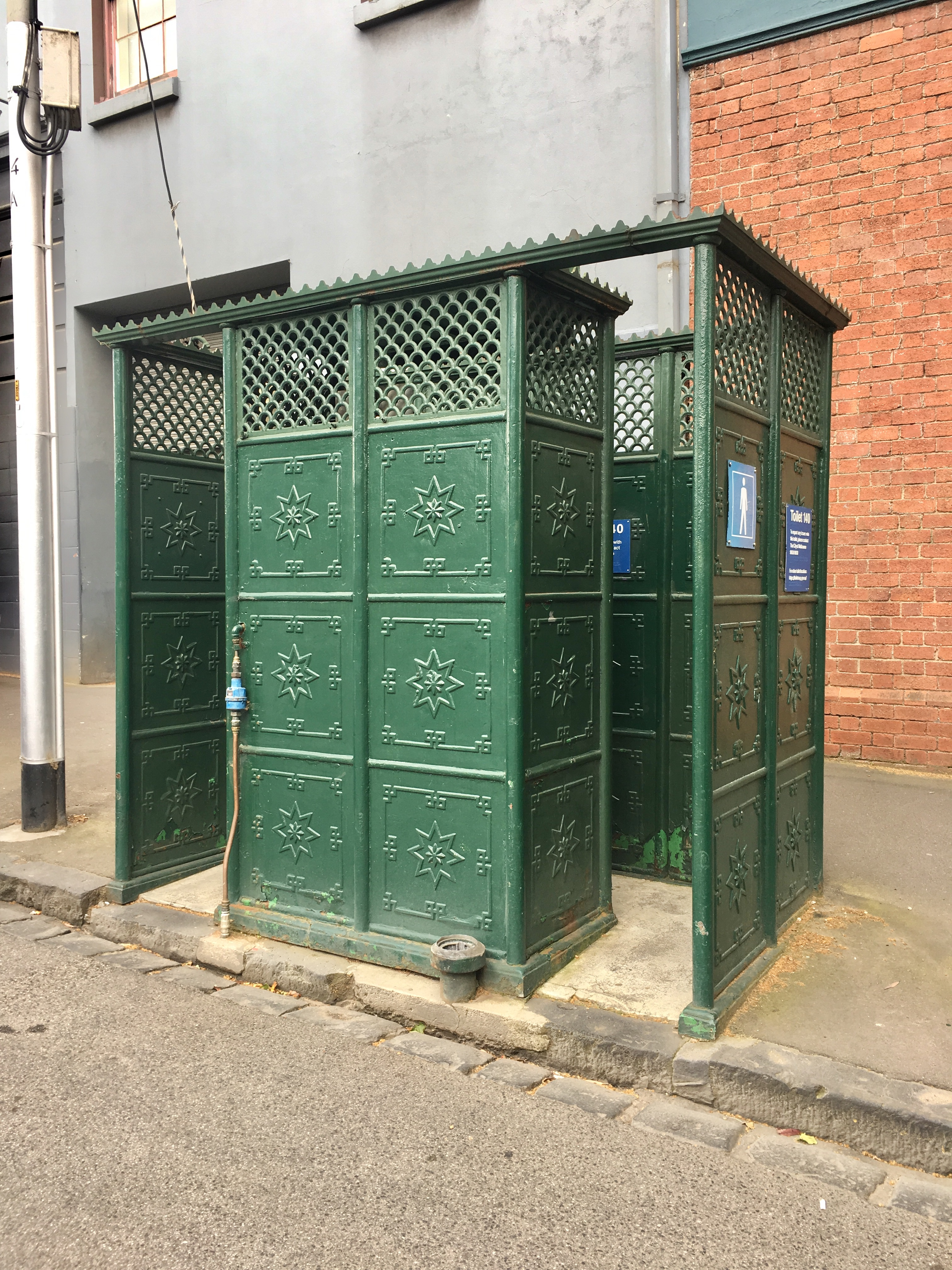
Cast iron urinal Melbourne

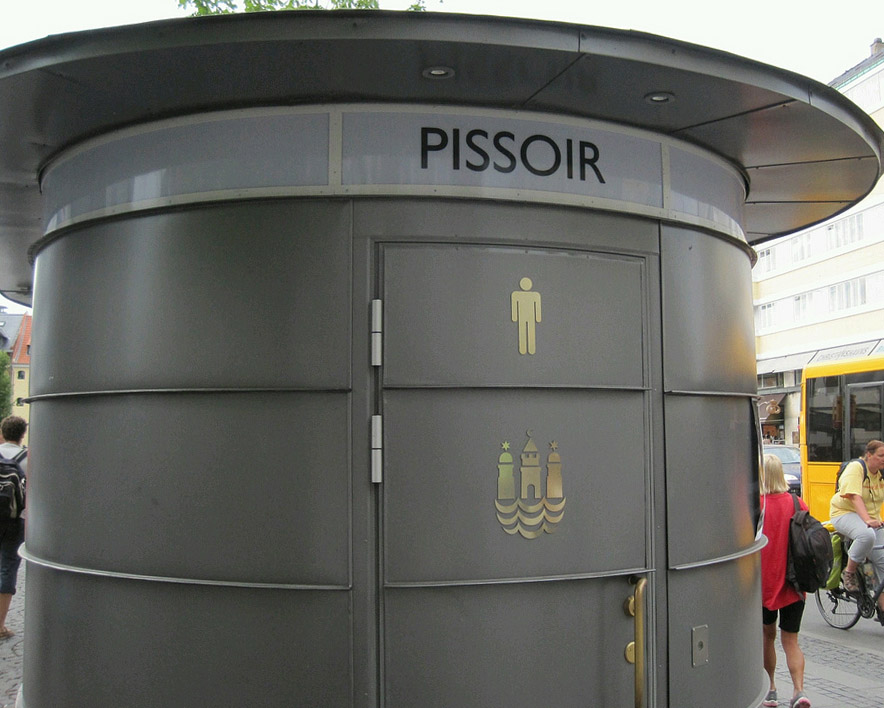
Pissoir in Copenhagen

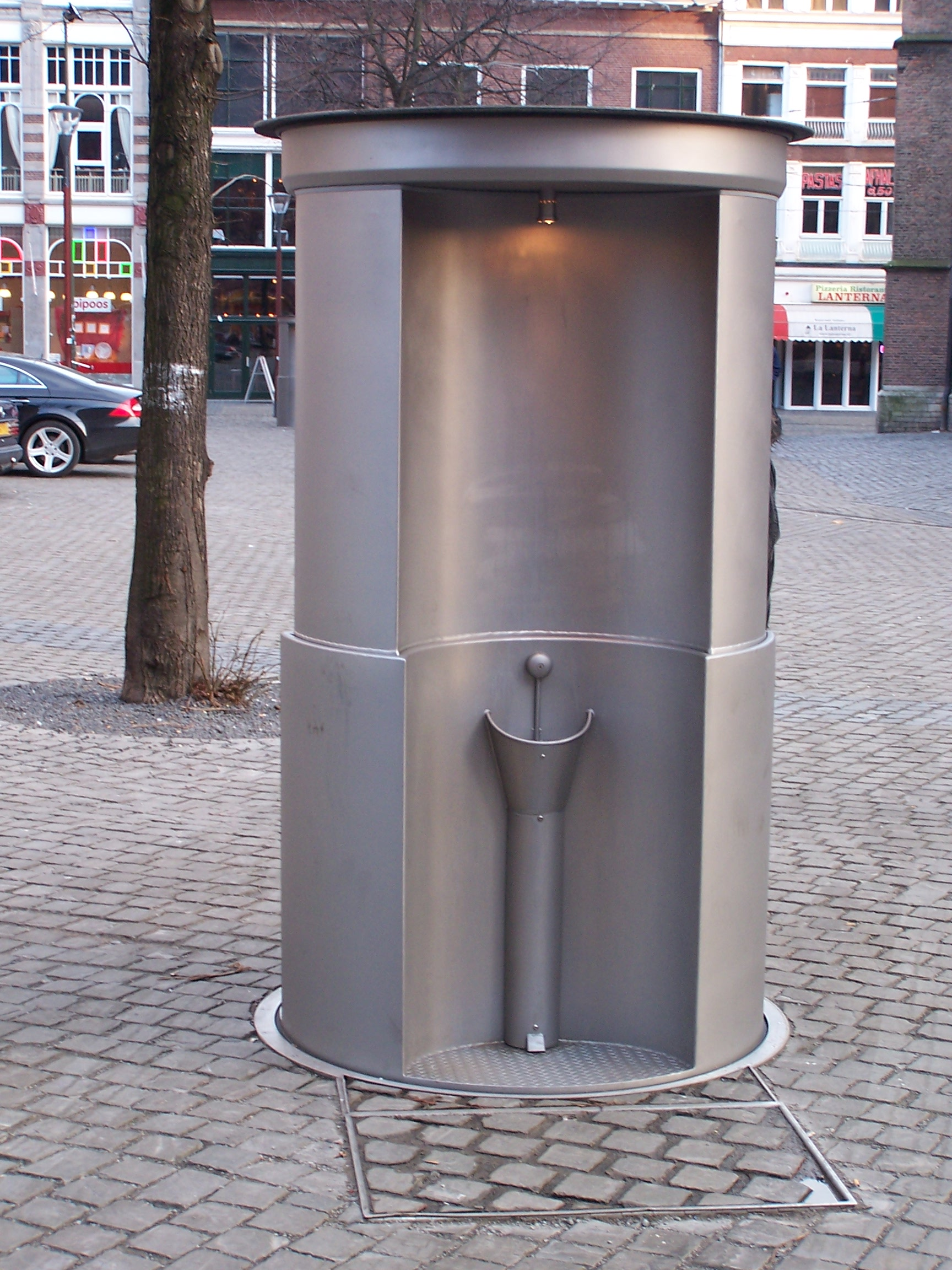
A retractable pissoir (telescopic urinal) in The Hague

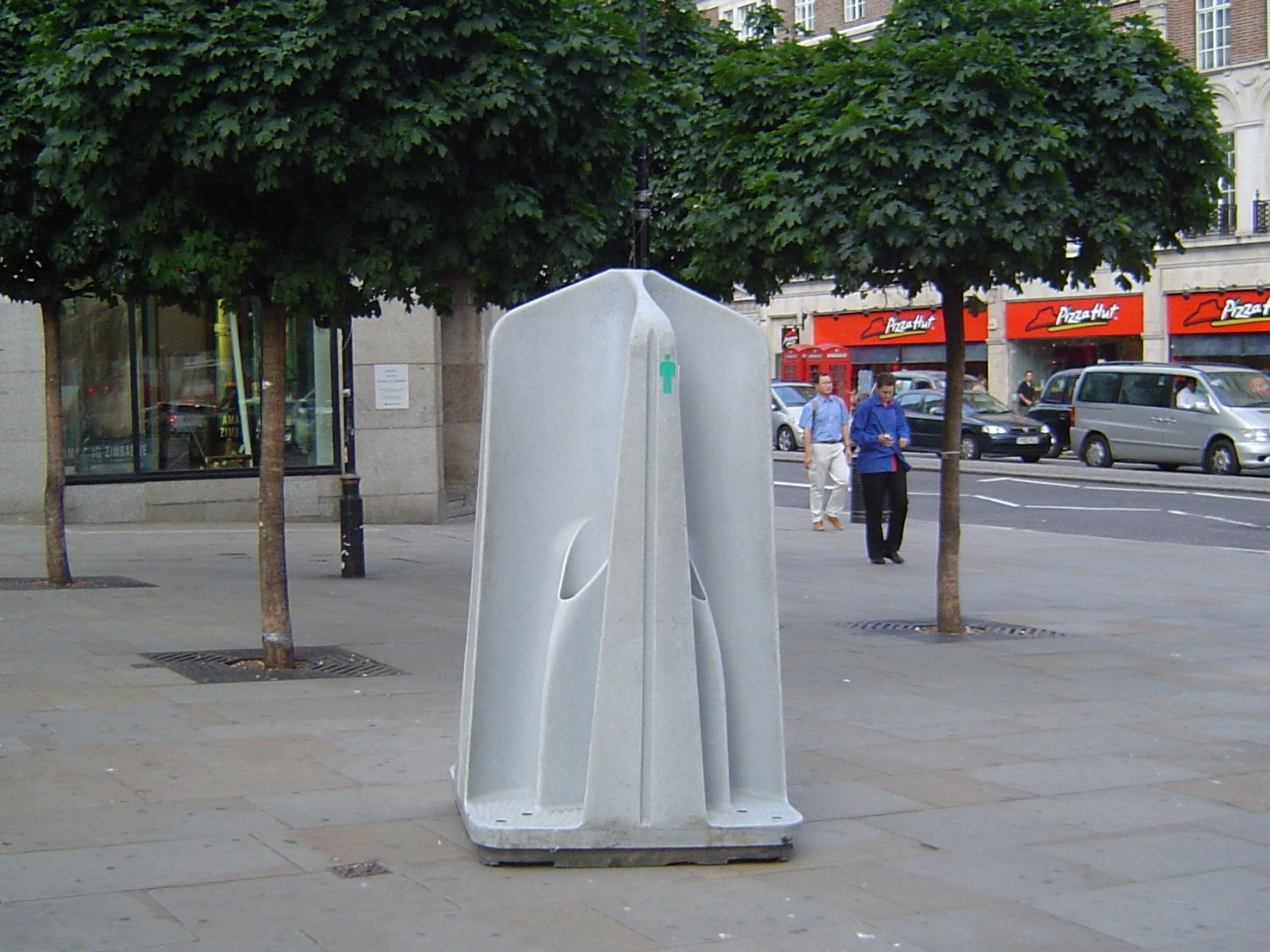
Plaskruis in London

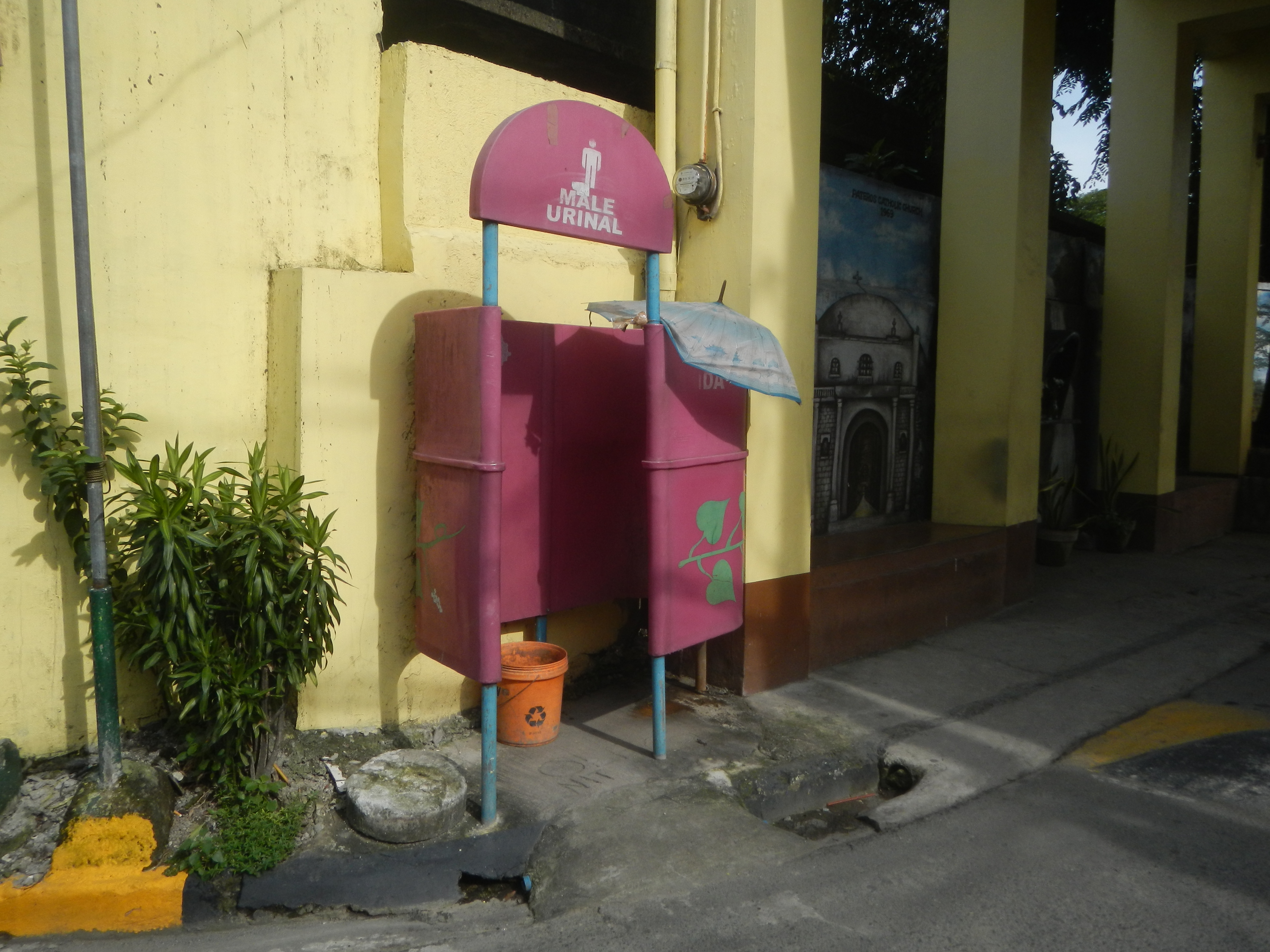
MMDA street urinal in Pateros, Metro Manila, Philippines

== See also ==
- Clochemerle (1934), a comic novel

== Bibliography ==
- Fierro, Alfred (1996). Histoire et dictionnaire de Paris. Robert Laffont. ISBN 2-221-07862-4.
- Pike, David L. (2005). Subterranean Cities: The World Beneath Paris and London, 1800-1945. Cornell University Press. ISBN 978-0-801-47256-5.
- Ress, Paul (2006). "The Vanashing Vespasienne". Shaggy Dog Tales: 58 1/2 Years of Reportage. Xlibris. pp. 49–51. ISBN 978-1-450-09805-2.
