= Pee curl =

Type of public toilet in Amsterdam

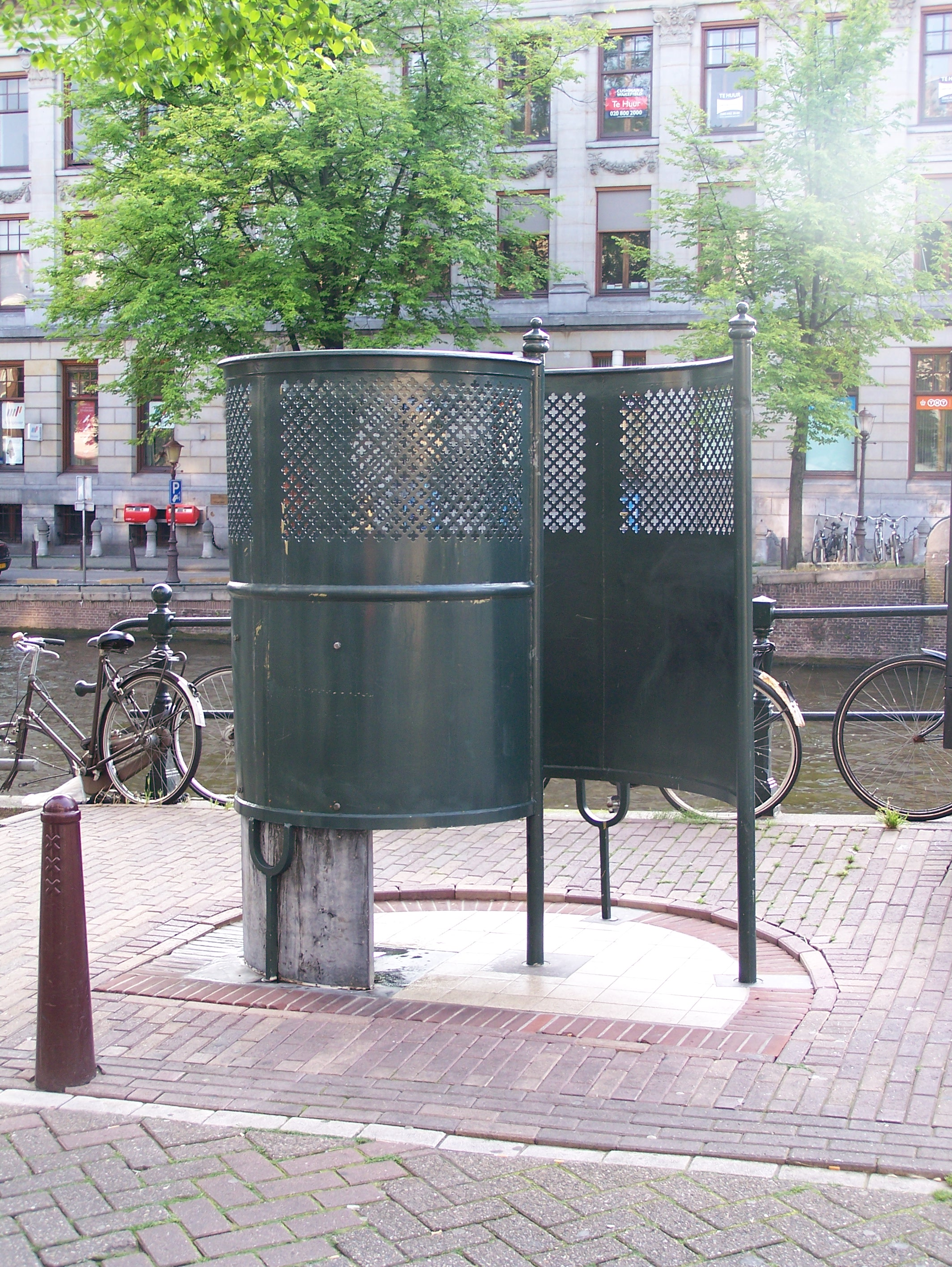
Single pee curl at Singel

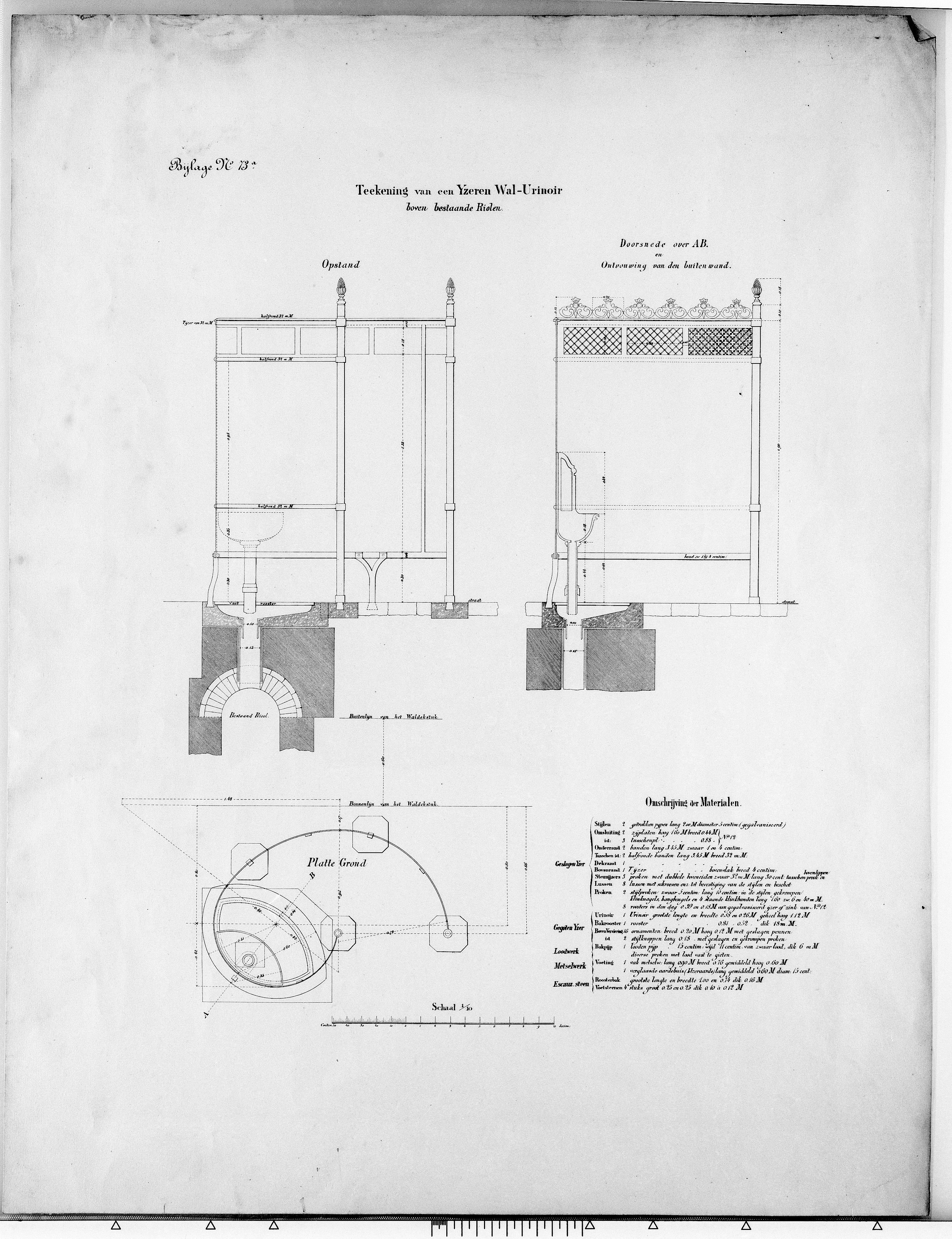
The design of a pee curl

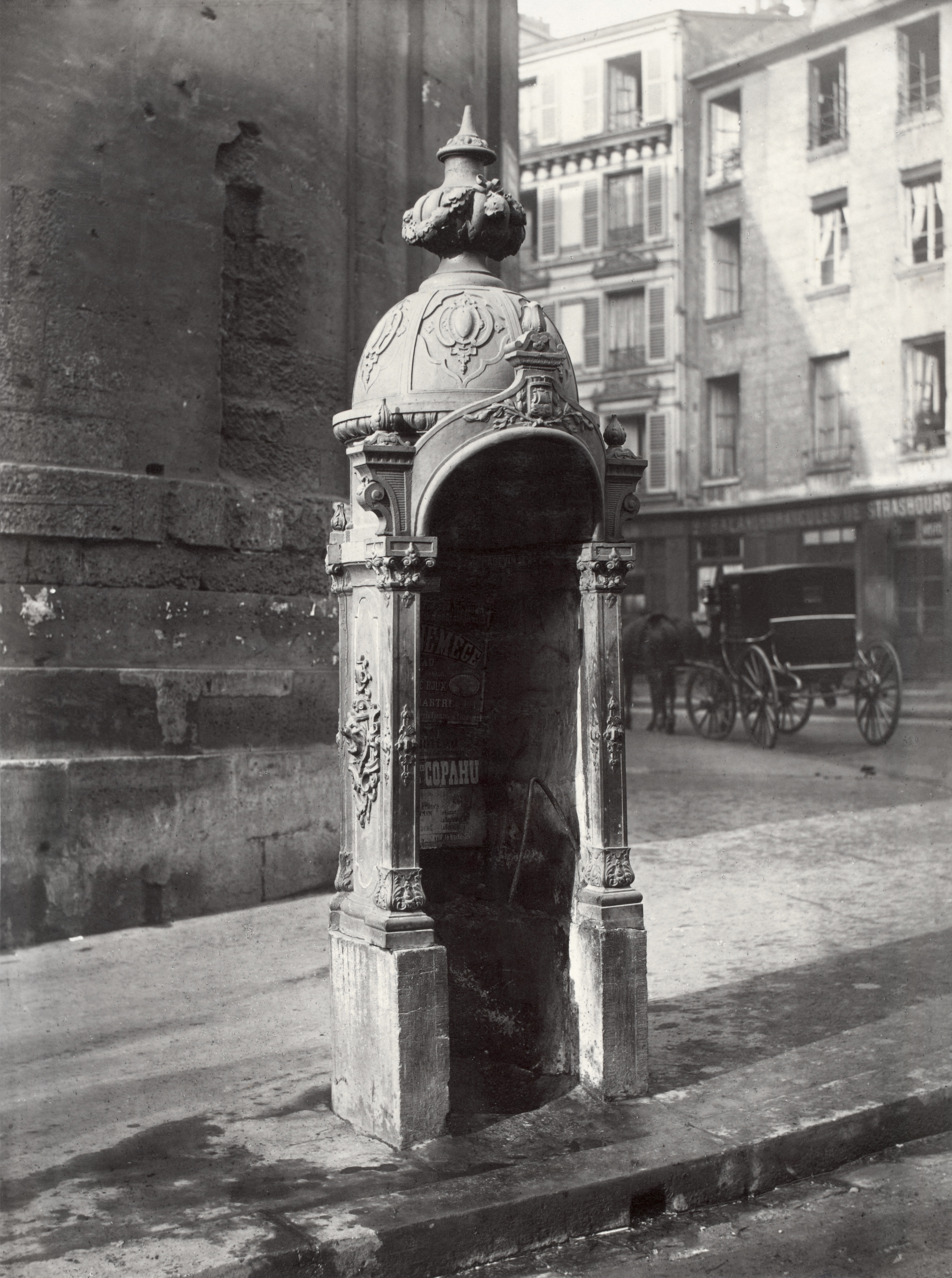
A photo of one of the Pissoirs installed in 1800s Paris, taken by Charles Marville around 1865

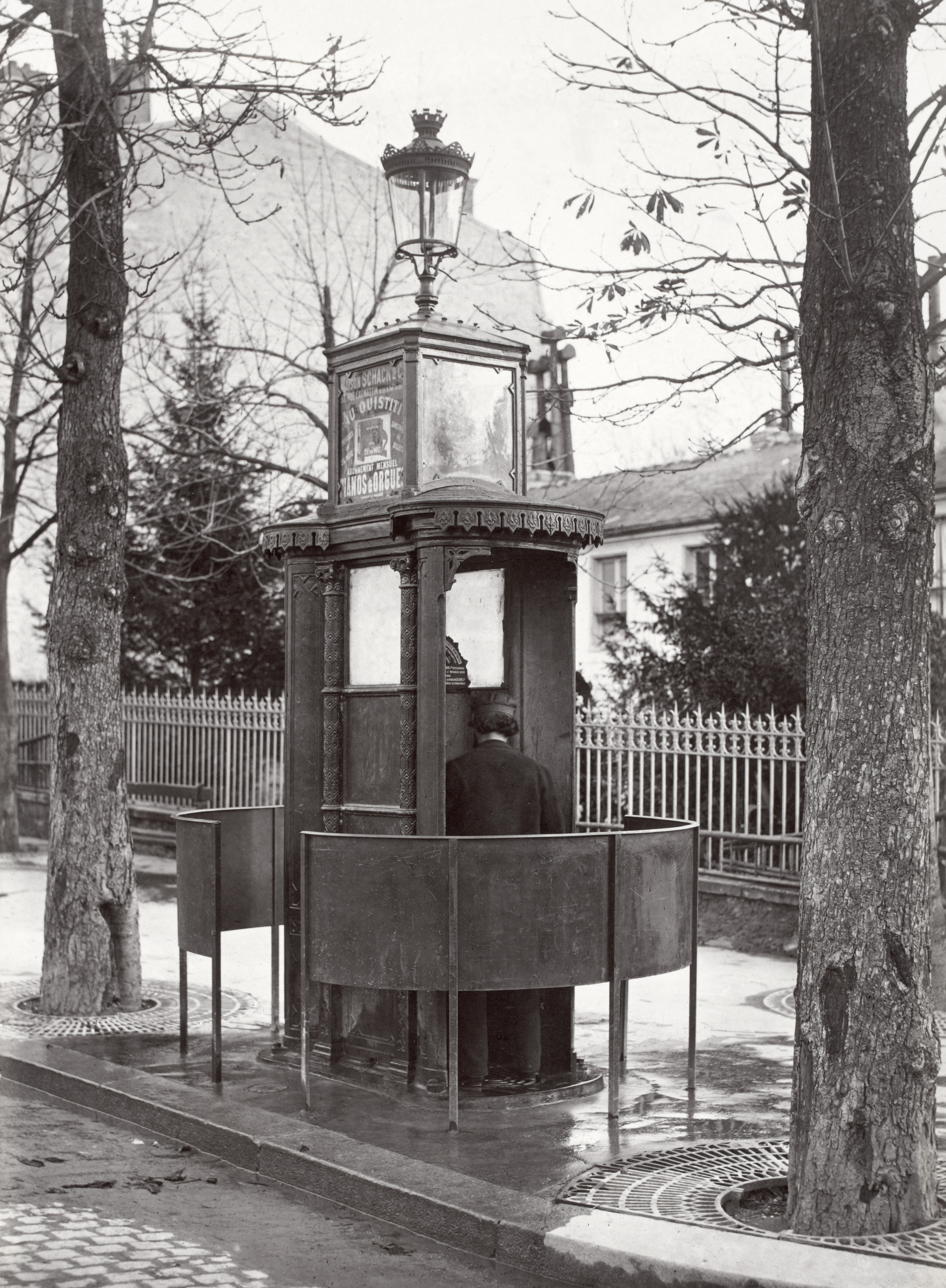
An example of one of the latter designs of the French pissoirs, photographed by Charles Marville around 1875

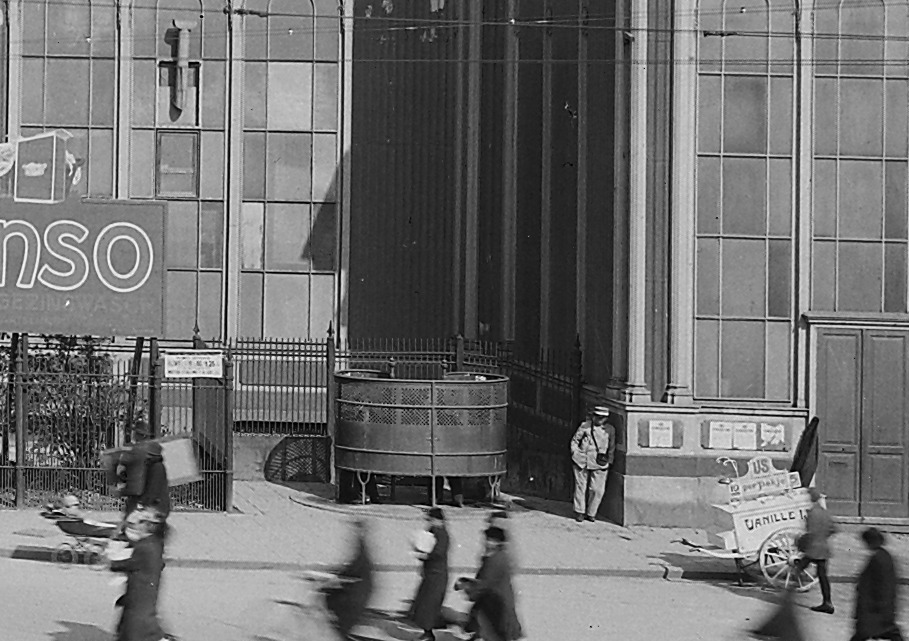
A double pee curl at the Paleis voor Volksvlijt, where they were first placed

The pee curl (Dutch: plaskrul) is a public urinal, many of which are found in the centre of Amsterdam. They originated at the end of the 19th century, and were first installed by the Public Works Department of Amsterdam.

The curl is made of a spiral-shaped steel sheet suspended half a metre above the ground by four iron legs, and painted dark green. The top half of the plate is perforated so that any passers-by can determine at eye-level whether it is vacant or in use. The floor is made of tiles with a natural stone slab making up the urinal itself, housing the central drain. The curls are connected to the sewer by this drain and are cleaned by the local municipality with water from the canal. The curls come in either a single or double version, with some coming equipped with roofs.

== Background ==
By the 1800s, public sanitation in Paris was in a poor condition, with the city having a major problem with public urination. The population was also rapidly increasing with an expectation for it to pass a million by 1840.

The city government of Paris decided to install the first public urinals on the major boulevards in the spring of 1830, with them being ready for the summer. In July that same year however, many were destroyed and used as street barricades during the French Revolution of 1830.

A cholera epidemic spread from Britain to Paris in 1832, killing 18,500 people (or roughly 2% of the city's population at the time) in 169 days. Among the dead was the French Prime Minister Casimir Pierre Périer. The epidemic also brought Paris' economy to a standstill, with those who could flee doing so and anyone who stayed adopting futile measures to protect themselves from it.

The Préfet de la Seine, Claude-Philibert de Rambuteau, began installing over 400 pissoirs in 1839 in an effort to fix the sanitation issues in Paris while also working to improve the water supply to the city, to enlarge the Paris sewer system and to install gas lighting in the city. The pissoirs that were installed at the time were simple, single-person masonry tubes with an entrance cut into the street side and a cornice and ball above. Despite these efforts, public urination continued to be an issue, with Parisians still relieving themselves "en plein air" according to an April 1843 column in the Gazette Municipale.

== History ==
In 1859, 20 years after the introduction of the pissoirs, Dutch inventor Leijs proposed the placement of similar hollow pillars to try and solve Amsterdam's issues with public sanitation, however, the design of the pee curl was chosen. In the 19th and through the majority of the 20th century, facilities like the Dutch pee curls and French pissoirs were sometimes used by homosexual men to have sex. The anxiety of the public and the government regarding homosexuality thus influenced the design of the pee curl and later designs of the pissoir, with clear visibility into them.

The first of the pee curls were not installed until 1870, with 1877 bringing the first double pee curl – an S-shaped curl with opposing chambers – to the Paleis voor Volksvlijt. An updated design of the pee curl was later created in 1916 by architect Joan van der Mey.

=== 20th century and women's rights ===
The Dutch Feminist group Dolle Mina was founded in 1969 to campaign for equal rights for women, including public "pee-right". The group mainly fought to improve said rights by using protests in a playful and humorous manner. One of these protests occurred in Amsterdam's Dam Square in April 1970, installing a "towering papier-mâché penis with a sign that read damestoilet (ladies' room)." The structure was placed there to address the lack of public toilets for women in Amsterdam. That same year, several public toilets were wrapped with pink ribbons to protest this imbalance.

In 1985, Sanisettes were installed in Amsterdam, however they were deemed to be too expensive and were removed some years later.

==== Plasrecht ====
Geerte Piening on a DWDD interview

Geerte Piening was fined €90 for public urination in 2015 when she relieved herself in an alleyway in Amsterdam due to the fact that the nearest public toilet that was designed for use by women was several kilometres away. She refused to pay the fine on the grounds that she felt that the design of public toilets in Amsterdam discriminated against women, and she was unable to go to a bar to pay to go to relieve herself as it was beyond closing time.

The male judge in the case, however, held that "it would not be pleasant but it can be done", regarding the use of urinals and pee curls. Piening was forced to pay the fine. This led to widespread mockery by the public and even led some women to demonstrate the "obvious difficulties" of using male urinals.

This event also led to a call being put out on Facebook by Cathelijne Hornstra for people to gather and protest at the spot where Geerte was found by police. The protest was cancelled because of the overwhelming interest, with the organisers asking those interested (said to be nearly 10,000 women) to gather at urinals across Amsterdam. Attendees were asked to upload photos on Facebook and Instagram with the hashtag "#wildplassen", the Dutch word for the crime of public urination.

=== 21st century use ===
All remaining examples of the original pee curls were repainted, galvanised, and restored in 2008. The city had thirty-five of the original pee curls as of 2017.

It was announced in 2016 that new retractable urinals for women would be placed in Dam Square, Amsterdam. The urinals were equipped with two urinals for men and a toilet for women, which has a lockable sliding door.

The pee curls to the side of the canals are kept in place by the local government to keep people from publicly urinating and thereby falling in the canal, in an attempt to cut down on the number of people falling into the canal; an average of 15 people drown each year in the canals for multiple reasons, including public urination.

=== Phase-out policy ===
There are 37 cast iron pee curls and three modern pee curls in Amsterdam as of 2024, however, the municipality has introduced a phase-out policy where, should one be damaged, removed or otherwise receive complaints, they are not to be replaced. The aim is to replace them with an "MVG-toilet", a type of public toilet usable by men, women and disabled people.
