= Café Achteck =

Slang for certain public urinals in Berlin, Germany

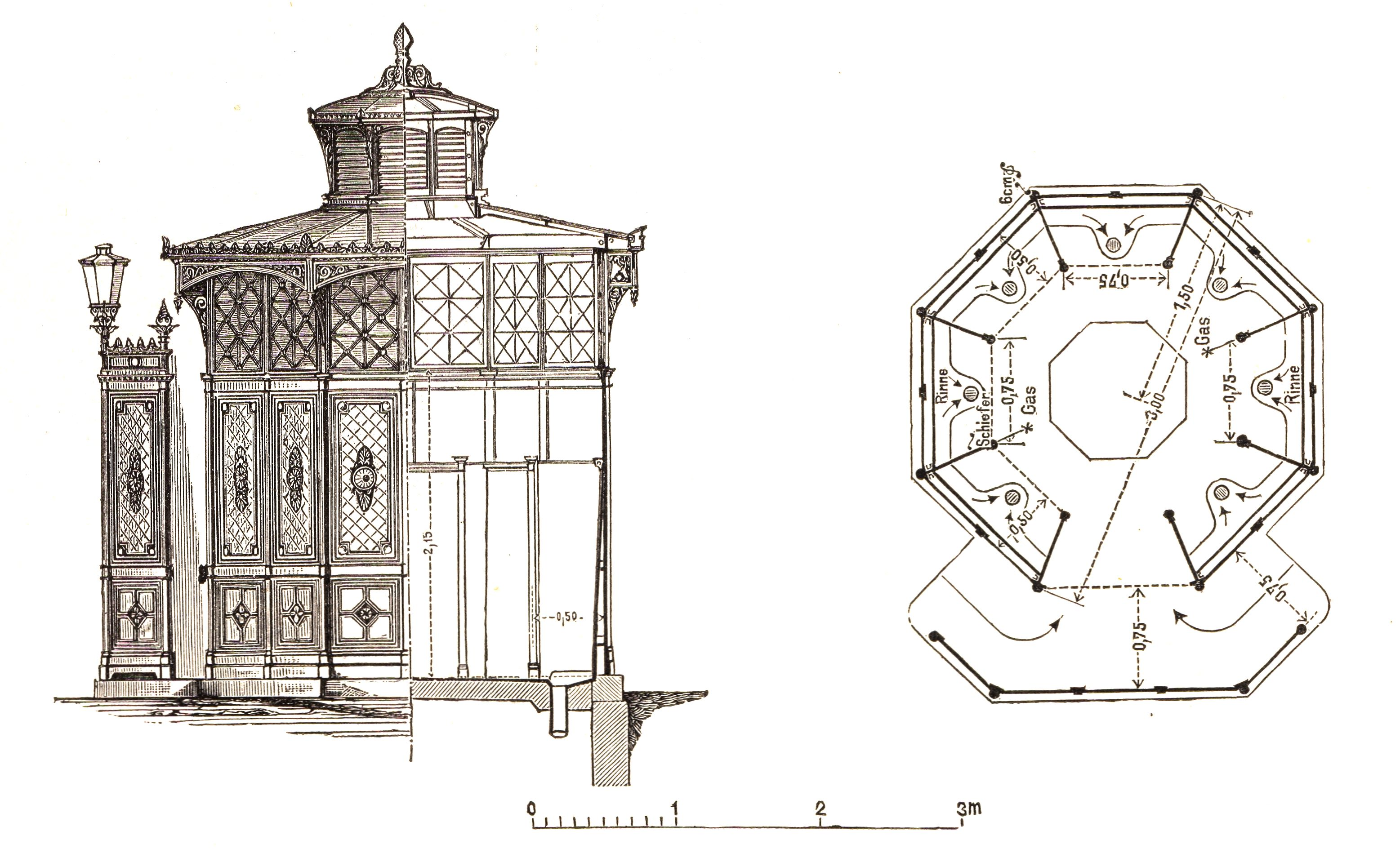
Outline, section and floor plan, from Berlin und seine Bauten, 1896

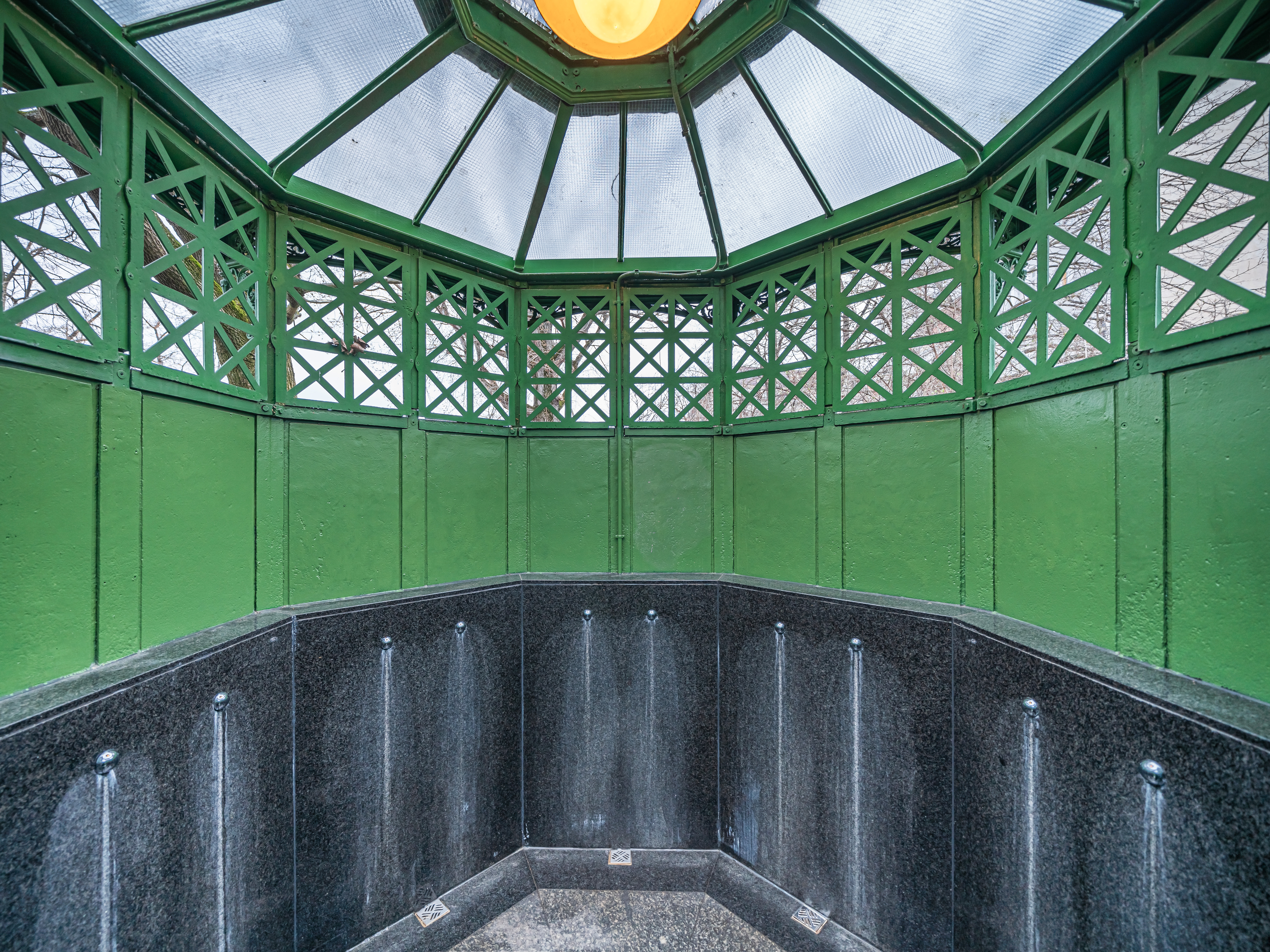
Café Achteck interior

Café Achteck (Octagon Café) is a common local slang for certain public urinals in Berlin. These urinals consist of seven ornamentally decorated, green-painted cast iron wall segments, arranged onto an octagonal floor plan, provide standing room for seven men, and the eighth side is the entrance. The roof is crowned by an eight-sided ventilation hood. In front of the entrance, there is a privacy screen of at least three segments. The design for these urinals came from the city councillor Carl Theodor Rospatt in 1878. In 1920 there were about 142 of these urinals in Greater Berlin, and today about a dozen preserved specimens can be found.

== History ==
The predecessor of this design, whose formation was prompted by the then police chief Guido von Madai in the early 1870s and had to give way to the Café Achteck, had the colloquial name "Madai-Tempel". The emerging competition in 1889 was a rounder, but still octagonal, model from the entrepreneurial group Asten and Hirschberg, known locally as "Rotunde" because of the similarity to a rotunda.

The first two Rospatt-type plants were erected in 1879 on Weddingplatz and Arminiusplatz. The officially named Waidmannslust-type soon took over the neighbouring regions of Berlin. Initially, public toilets were male-only, and it was only around the year 1900 that there were women's toilets in public. The design from 1878 continued to be manufactured into the 1900s, for instance, the Cafe Achteck at Stephanplatz in Stephankiez was erected in 1899. By 1900, there were at least a hundred across Berlin.

Until 1997, all facilities were the responsibility of Berliner Stadtreinigung, and since then the street furniture supplier Wall AG. Since the early 1990s, some copies have been renovated and are back in operation, including, since 2000, the unit at Stephanplatz. The historically appropriate restoration of a Café Achteck cost about 250,000 DM. Some of the facilities have been rebuilt differently, with separate male and female modern-style toilets set up within the old ironworks.

There are now only about a dozen remaining, as well as two much larger rectangular examples. The large rectangular example at Schlesisches Tor U-Bahn station has been repurposed as a hamburger bar.

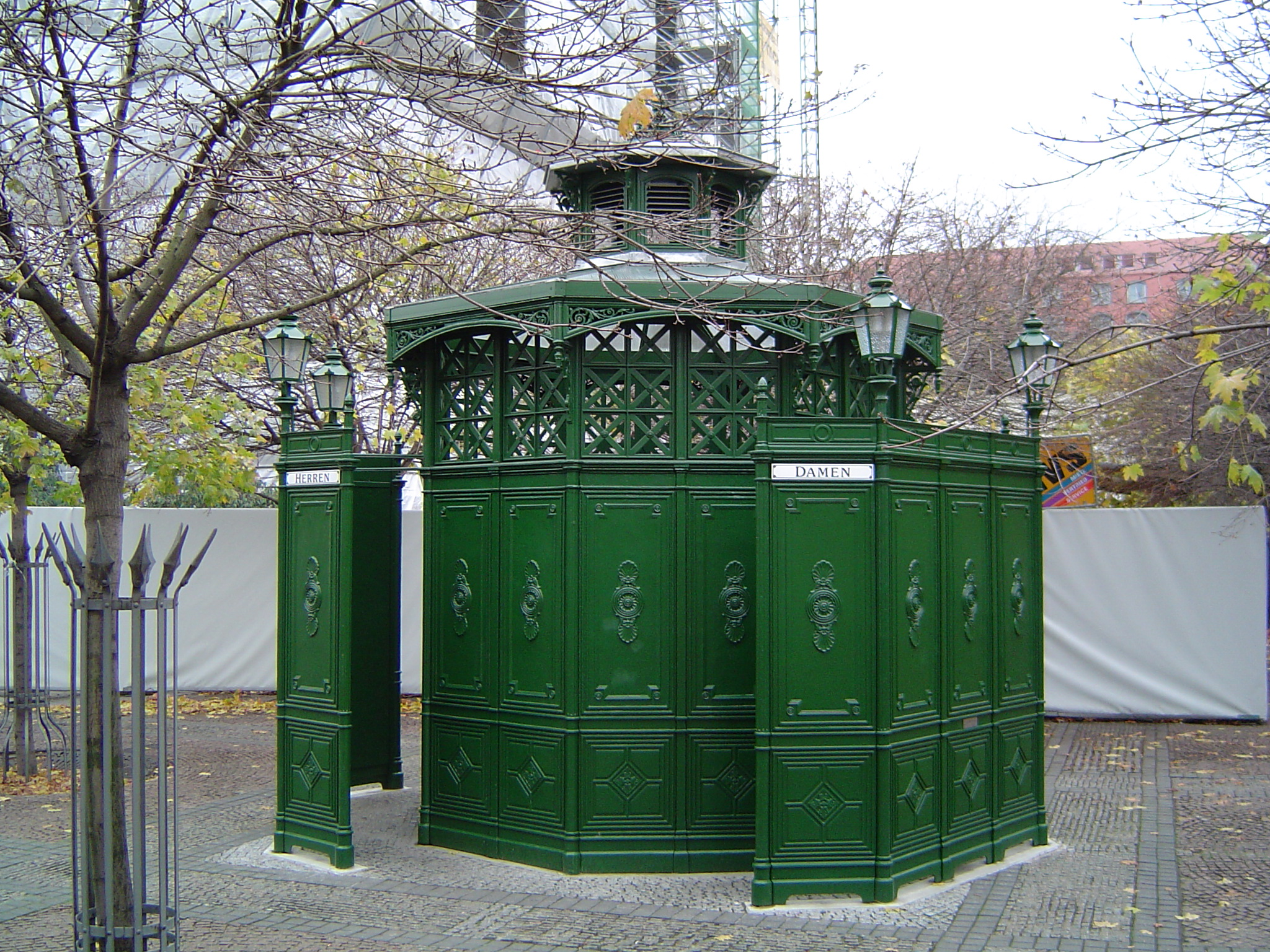
At Gendarmenmarkt

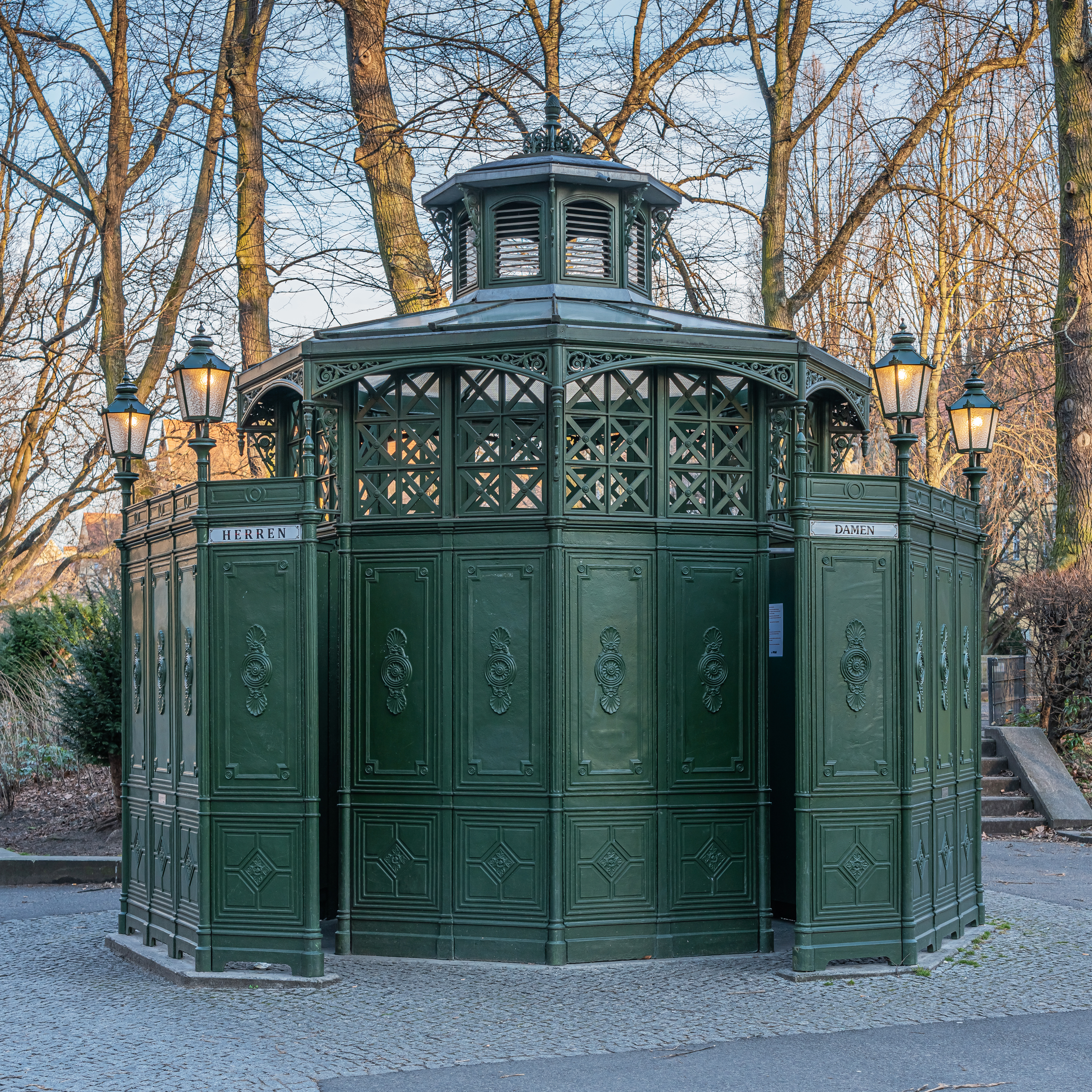
At Rüdesheimer Platz

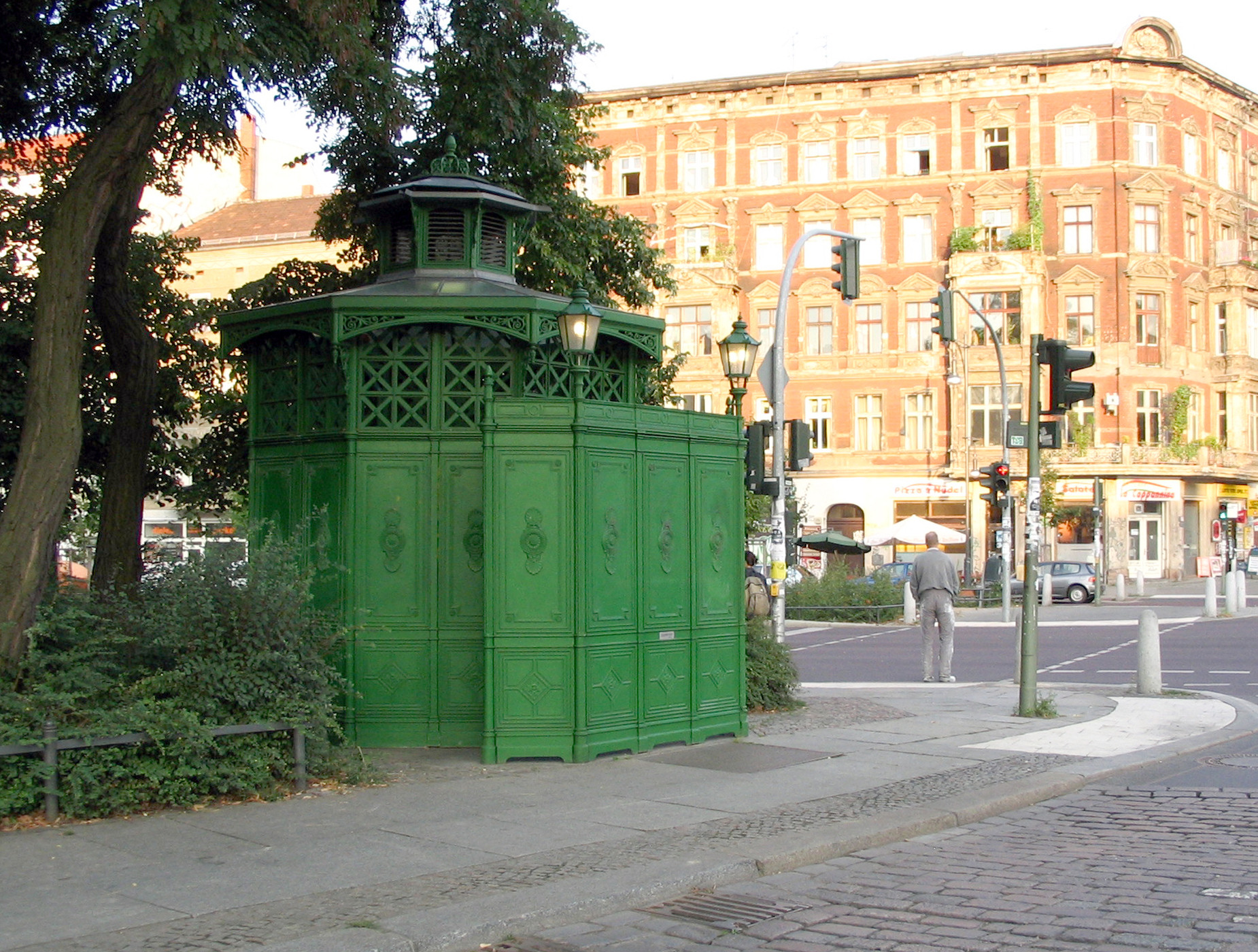
At the Senefelderplatz subway station

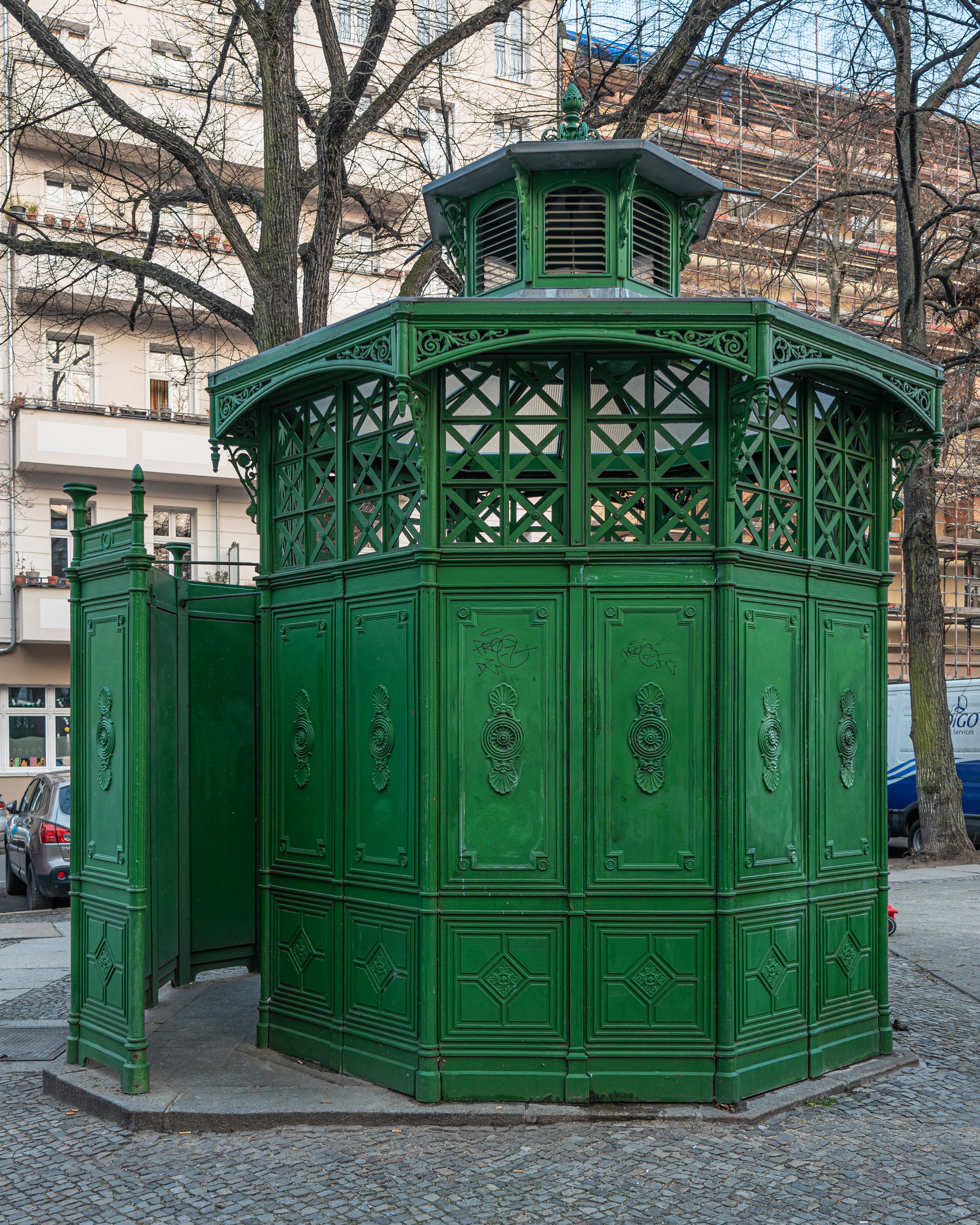
In Stephankiez

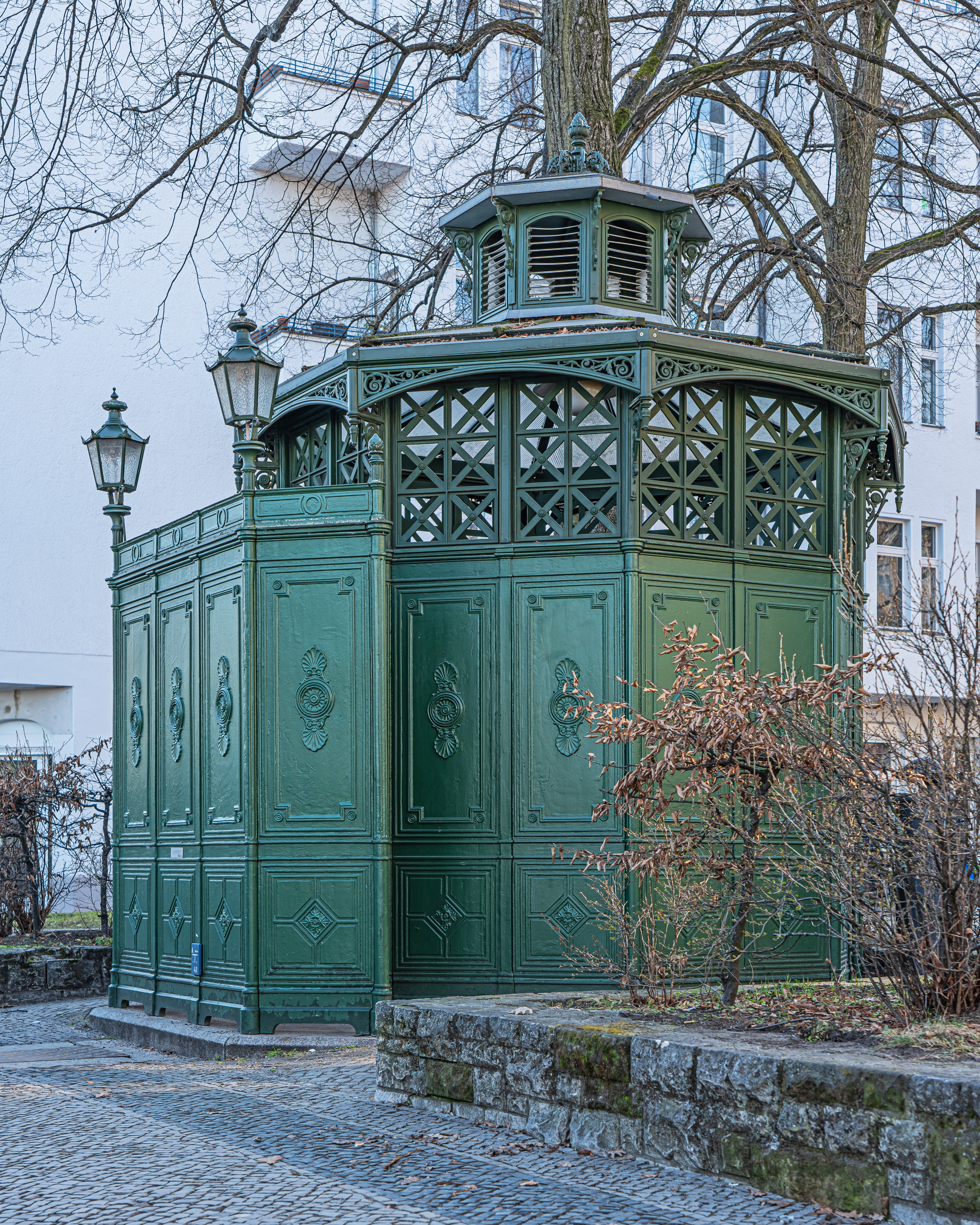
At Leuthener Platz
