= Telescopic toilet =

Type of toilet

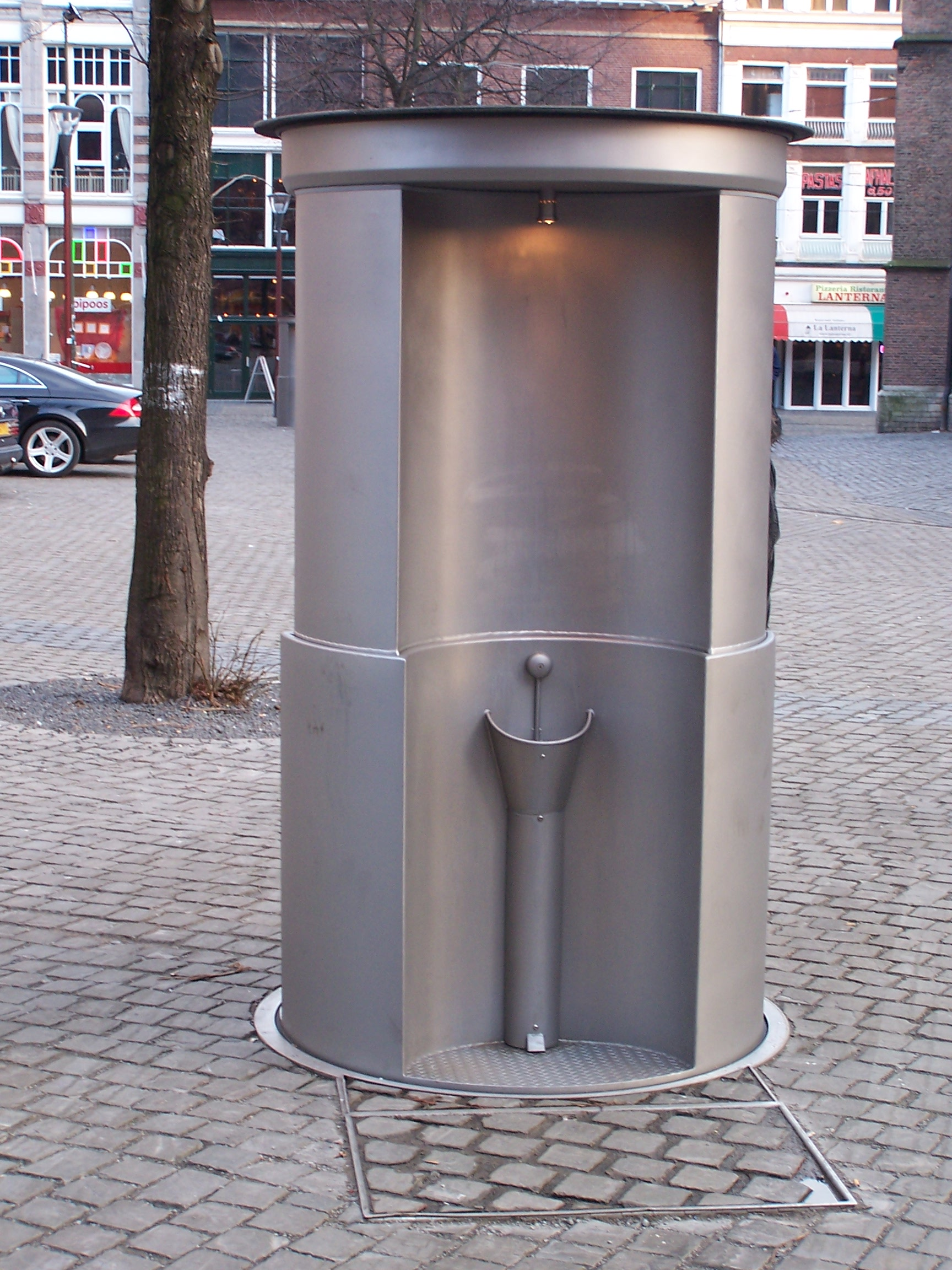
Urilift-brand telescopic toilet in The Hague

A telescopic toilet, retractable toilet, or pop-up toilet, is a type of toilet which is stored underground and then raised (usually hydraulically) above ground when in use.

A very common type of telescopic toilet is a telescopic urinal, and they have often been employed at nighttimes or on weekends to discourage street urination.

== History ==
Telescopic toilets were first invented and installed in the Netherlands in the form of telescopic urinals. In 2002 they were introduced in London for night time use, with more being installed in 2012. By 2014 there were over 200 across Sweden, Belgium, Denmark, the United Kingdom, and the Netherlands. In 2016 the first female telescopic toilet was introduced in Amsterdam.

In 2014 a telescopic urinal shot up out of the ground due to a gas explosion, injuring the nearby system manager; usage of telescopic urinals was halted for a while, and then resumed. In 2023 a maintenance worker was crushed to death by a telescopic urinal on Shaftesbury Avenue in London when it fell suddenly on him, and a second telescopic urinal was subsequently shut.
