= Reims Cathedral =

Church and episcopal seat in Reims, France

- Cathedral of Our Lady of Reims
- French: Cathédrale Notre-Dame de Reims
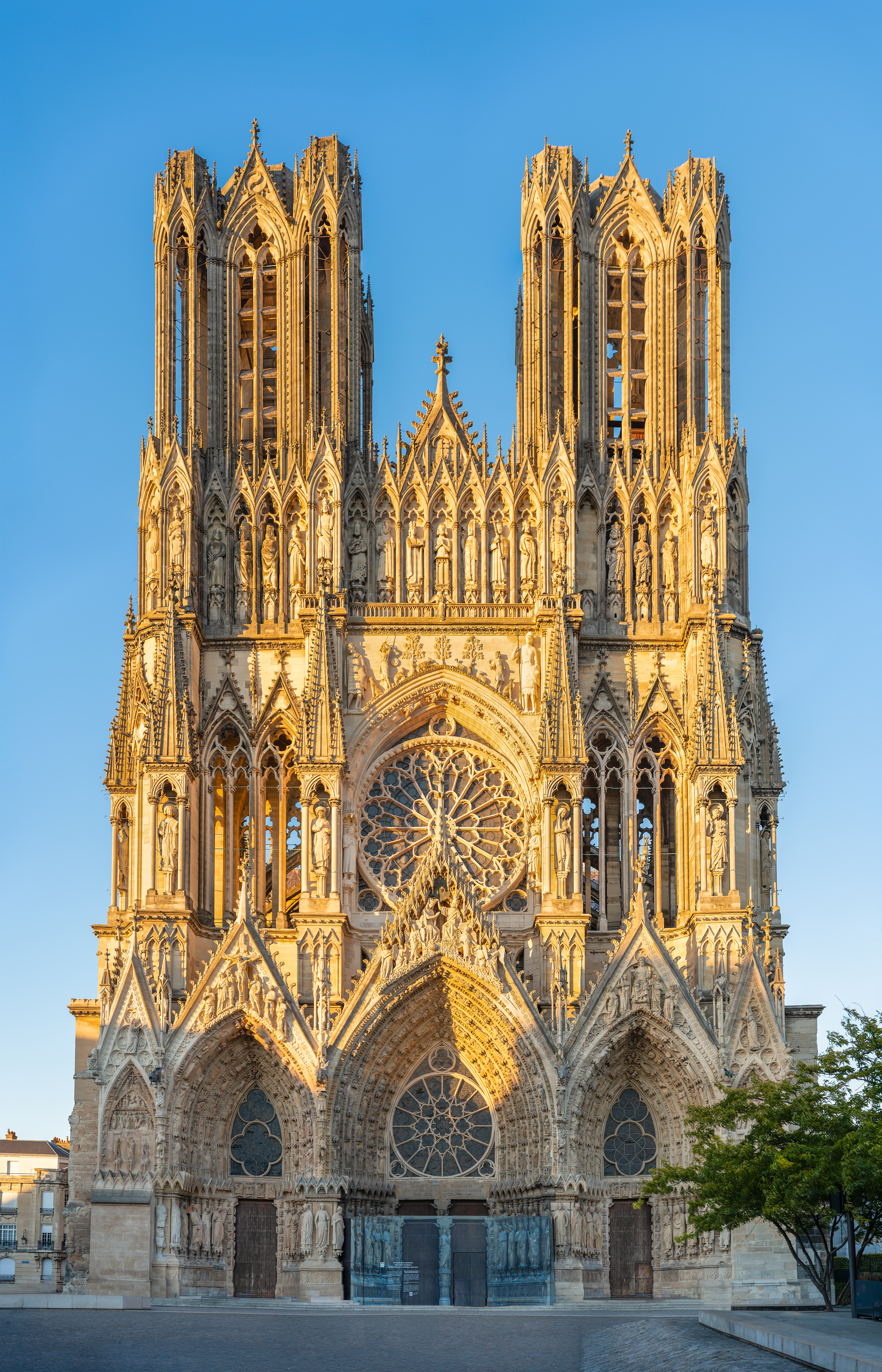
- Façade of the cathedral, looking northeast

- Location in France
- 49°15′14″N 4°2′3″E
- Location: Place du Cardinal Luçon, 51100; Reims
- Country: France
- Denomination: Roman Catholic
- Sui iuris church: Latin Church
- Website: www.cathedrale-reims.com

History
- Status: Cathedral
- Dedication: Our Lady of Reims

Architecture
- Functional status: Active
- Architect(s): Jean d'Orbais; Jean-le-Loup; Gaucher of Reims; Bernard de Soissons
- Architectural type: Church
- Style: High Gothic
- Years built: 1211–1345
- Groundbreaking: 1211
- Completed: 1275

Specifications
- Length: 149.17 m (489.4 ft)

Administration
- Archdiocese: Reims (Seat)

Clergy
- Archbishop: Éric de Moulins-Beaufort

UNESCO World Heritage Site
- Part of: Cathedral of Notre-Dame, Former Abbey of Saint-Rémi and Palace of Tau, Reims
- Criteria: Cultural: i, ii, vi
- Reference: 601-001
- Inscription: 1991 (15th Session)

Monument historique
- Official name: Cathédrale Notre-Dame
- Designated: 1862, 1920

Notre-Dame de Reims (/ˌnɒtrə ˈdɑːm, ˌnoʊtrə ˈdeɪm, ˌnoʊtrə ˈdɑːm/; French: [nɔtʁə dam də ʁɛ̃s]; meaning "Our Lady of Reims"), (Note: The name Notre Dame, meaning "Our Lady" was frequently used in names of churches including the cathedrals in France.) known in English as Reims Cathedral (also spelt Rheims Cathedral), is a Catholic cathedral in the French city of the same name, the seat of the Archdiocese of Reims. The cathedral was dedicated to the Virgin Mary and was the traditional location for the coronation of the kings of France. The cathedral is considered to be one of the most important works of Gothic architecture. A major tourist destination, it receives about a million visitors annually. It became a UNESCO World Heritage Site in 1991.

The cathedral is thought to have been founded by the bishop Nicasius in the early 5th century. Clovis was baptized a Christian here by Saint Remigius, the bishop of Reims, about a century later. He was the first Frankish king to receive this sacrament. Construction of the present cathedral began in the 13th century and concluded in the 14th century. A prominent example of High Gothic architecture, it was built to replace an earlier church destroyed by fire in 1210. Although little damaged during the French Revolution, the present cathedral saw extensive restoration in the 19th century. It was severely damaged during World War I and was again restored in the 20th century.

Since the 1905 law on the separation of Church and state, the cathedral has been owned by the French state, while the Catholic Church has an agreement for its exclusive use. The French state pays for its restoration and upkeep.

== History ==
=== 5th century – the Merovingian Cathedral ===
The settlement of a tribe of Gauls called the Remes, named Durocortorum, had been recorded by Julius Caesar in his accounts of the Gallic Wars. During the High Roman Empire, it became the capital of a province extending to the delta of the Rhine, and in the 3rd century A.D. was capital of the Roman province known as Second Belgium. The first Christian church there was founded by the first bishop, Saint Sixtus of Reims between 250 and 300.

At the beginning of the 5th century, in the Merovingian period, the bishop Nicasius transferred the cathedral its present location, the site formerly occupied by Gallo-Roman bath built by the Emperor Constantine. The new church was dedicated to the Virgin Mary, anticipating the decision of the Council of Ephesus in 431 establishing her enhanced status. The new cathedral, with the plan of a square exterior and a circular interior, measured approximately 20 m (66 ft) by 55 m (180 ft). In the 1990s, the Baptistry of this original Merovingian church, directly under the present cathedral, was excavated and fragments of the old structure were brought to light.

Clovis I, the king of the Franks, was baptised there in about 496 A.D. by Saint Remigius (also known as Saint Remi). This was the event that inspired the long tradition of royal coronations at Reims.

=== 9th century – the Carolingian cathedral ===
In 816, Louis the Pious, the king of the Franks and emperor of the Holy Roman Empire, was crowned in Reims by Pope Stephen IV. The coronation and ensuing celebrations revealed the poor condition and inadequate size of the early cathedral. Beginning in about 818, the archbishop Ebbo and the royal architect Rumaud began to build a much larger church from the ground up on the same site, using stone from the old city ramparts.

The work was interrupted in 835, and then resumed under a new archbishop, Hincmar, with the support of Emperor Charles the Bald. The interior of the church was adorned with gilding, mosaics, paintings, sculptures and tapestries. On 18 October 862, in the presence of the Emperor, Hincmar dedicated the new church, which measured 86 m (282 ft) and had two transepts.

At the beginning of the 10th century, an ancient crypt underneath the original church was rediscovered. Under the archbishop Heriveus, the crypt (which had been the initial centre of the previous churches above it) was cleared, renovated, and then rededicated to the sainted bishop Remigius. The cathedral altar is still in the same place, directly over the crypt, where it has been for 15 centuries.

Beginning in 976, the archbishop Adalbero began to enlarge the Carolingian cathedral. The historian Richerus, a pupil of Adalbero, gives a very precise description of the work carried out by the archbishop:

"He completely destroyed the arcades which, extending from the entrance to nearly a quarter of the basilica, up to the top, so that the whole church, embellished, acquired more extent and a more suitable form (...). He decorated the main altar of the golden cross and enveloped it with a resplendent trellis (...). He lit up the same church with windows in which various stories were represented and endowed it with bells roaring like thunder."

— Richerus of Reims

The prestige of the Holy Ampulla, the sacred vial filled with myrrh with which French Kings were anointed, the fact that Clovis I had been baptised there, and the political power of the archbishop of Reims led to Reims becoming the regular site of the coronation of the French monarch, a tradition that was established with the coronation of Henry I of France in 1027. All but seven of France's future kings --Hugh Capet, Robert II, Louis VII, John I, Henry IV, Louis XVIII, and Louis Philippe I-- were crowned at Reims.

The cathedral hosted other royal ceremonies as well. On 19 May 1051, Henry I of France and Anne of Kiev were married in the cathedral. While conducting the Council of Reims in 1131, Pope Innocent II anointed and crowned Louis VII, the son of the ruling king Louis VI in the cathedral.

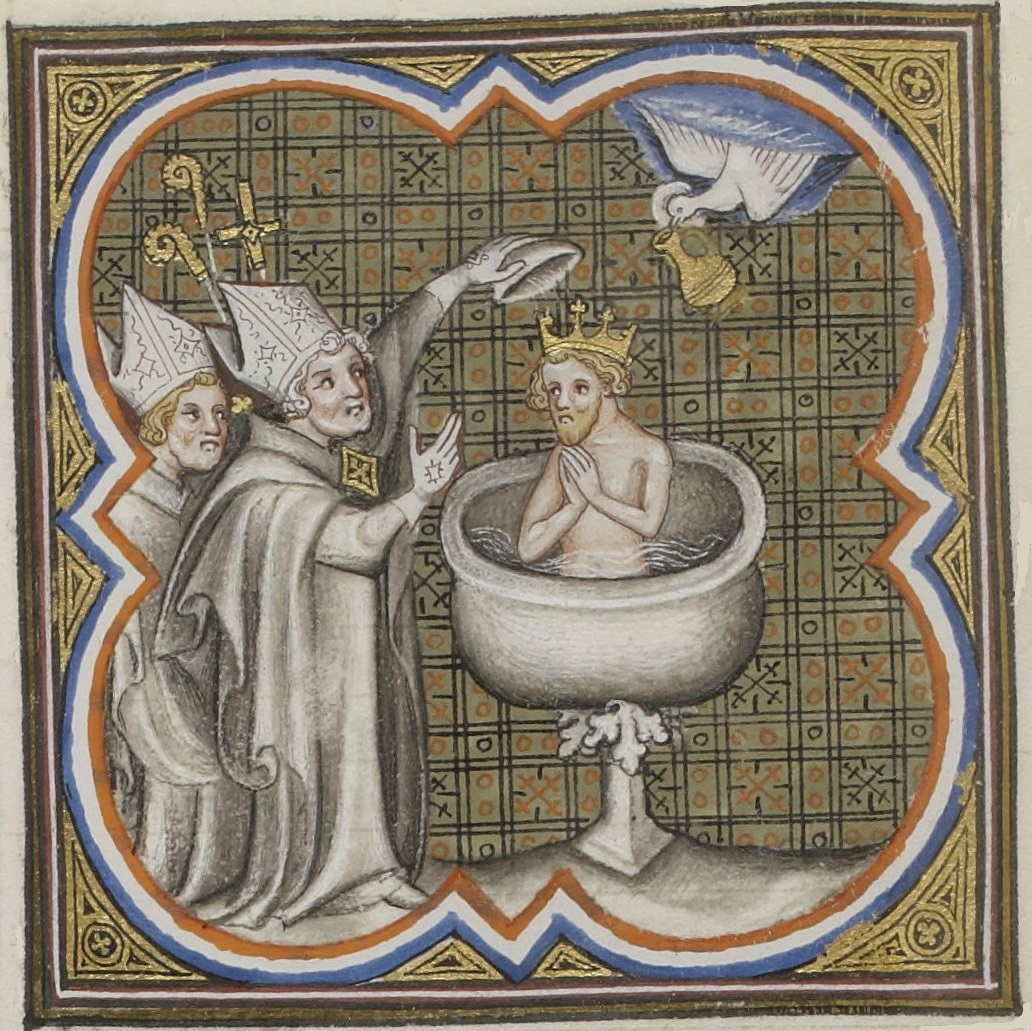
The baptism of Clovis by a Gothic artist (14th c.)

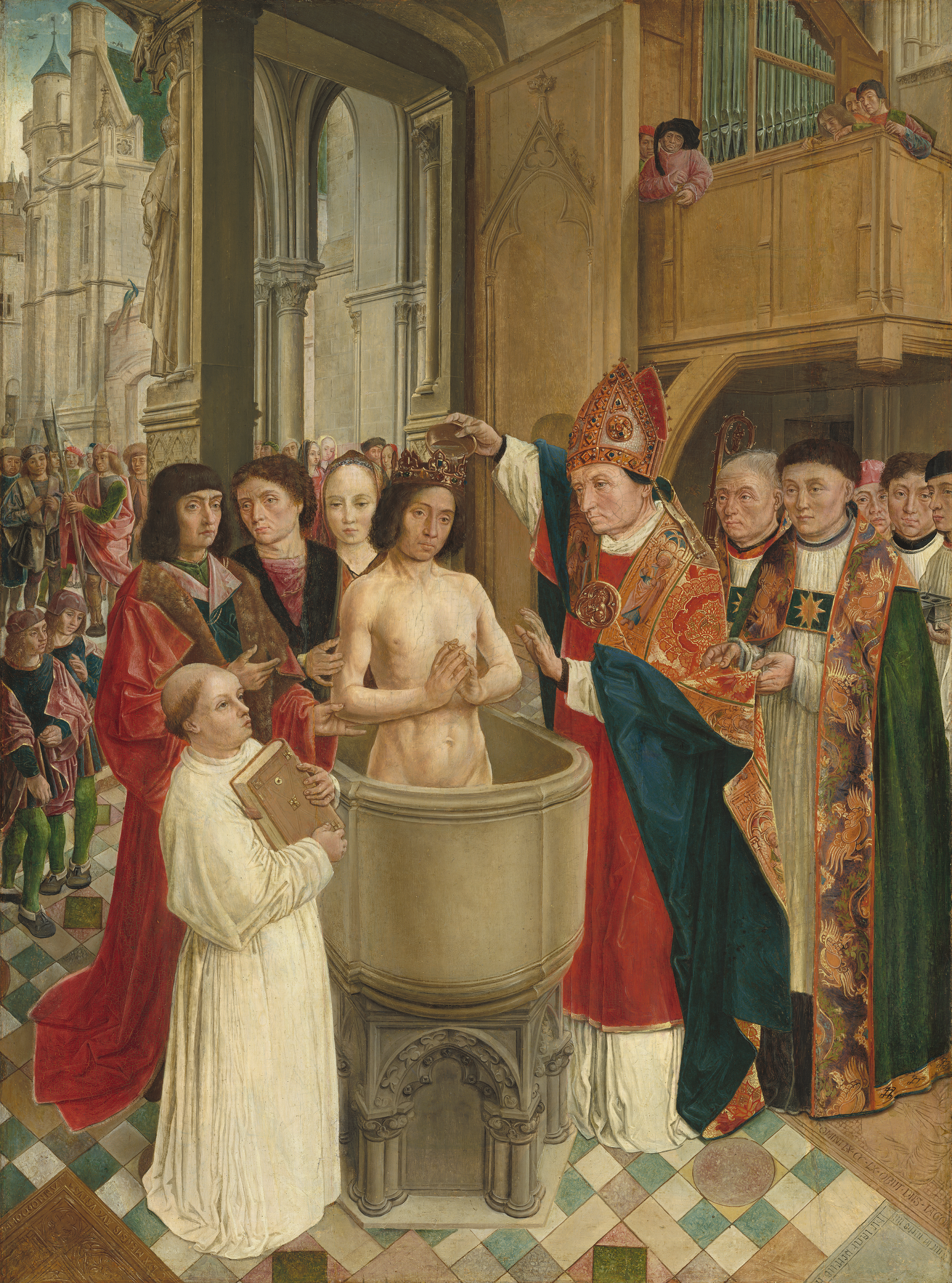
The baptism of Clovis by the Master of Saint Giles (16th c.)

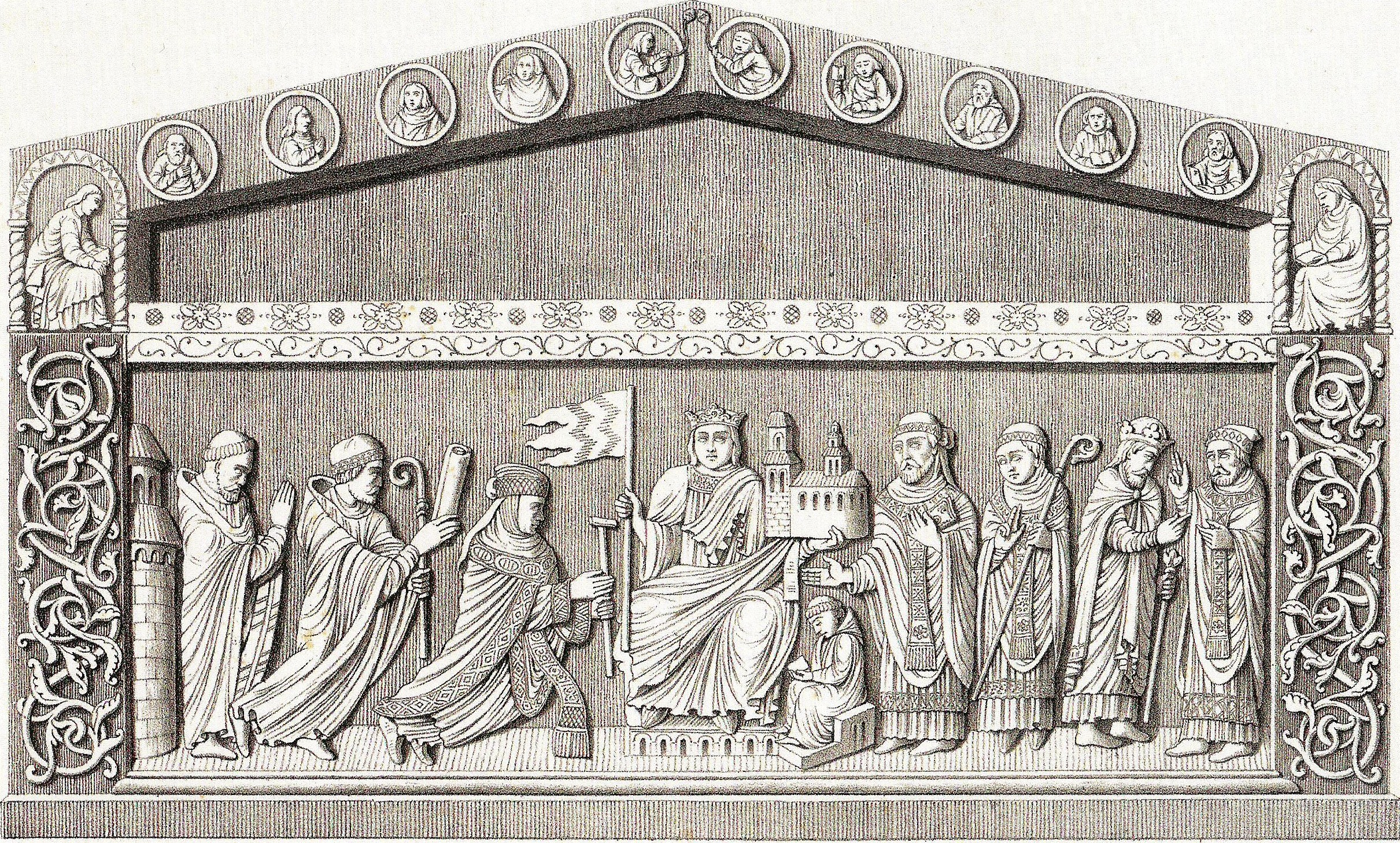
An image of the Carolingian cathedral on the tomb of Archbishop Hincmar (9th century), destroyed in 1793

=== 12th century – the Early Gothic cathedral ===
By the 12th century, the Carolingian cathedral was considered too small for the ambitions of the archbishop, Samson of Mauvoisin (1140–1160). He preserved the existing nave and transept but rebuilt and enlarged the two ends of the cathedral. He demolished the west front and adjoining tower in order to build two matching flanking towers, in imitation of the Royal Abbey of Saint Denis outside of Paris, whose choir dedication Samson himself had attended a few years earlier. The new church was longer than the old cathedral, 110 m (360 ft). On the east end, he created a larger choir and a disambulatory and ring of radiating chapels. At the end of the century, the nave and the transept were still of the Carolingian style while the apse and façade were in the Early Gothic style.

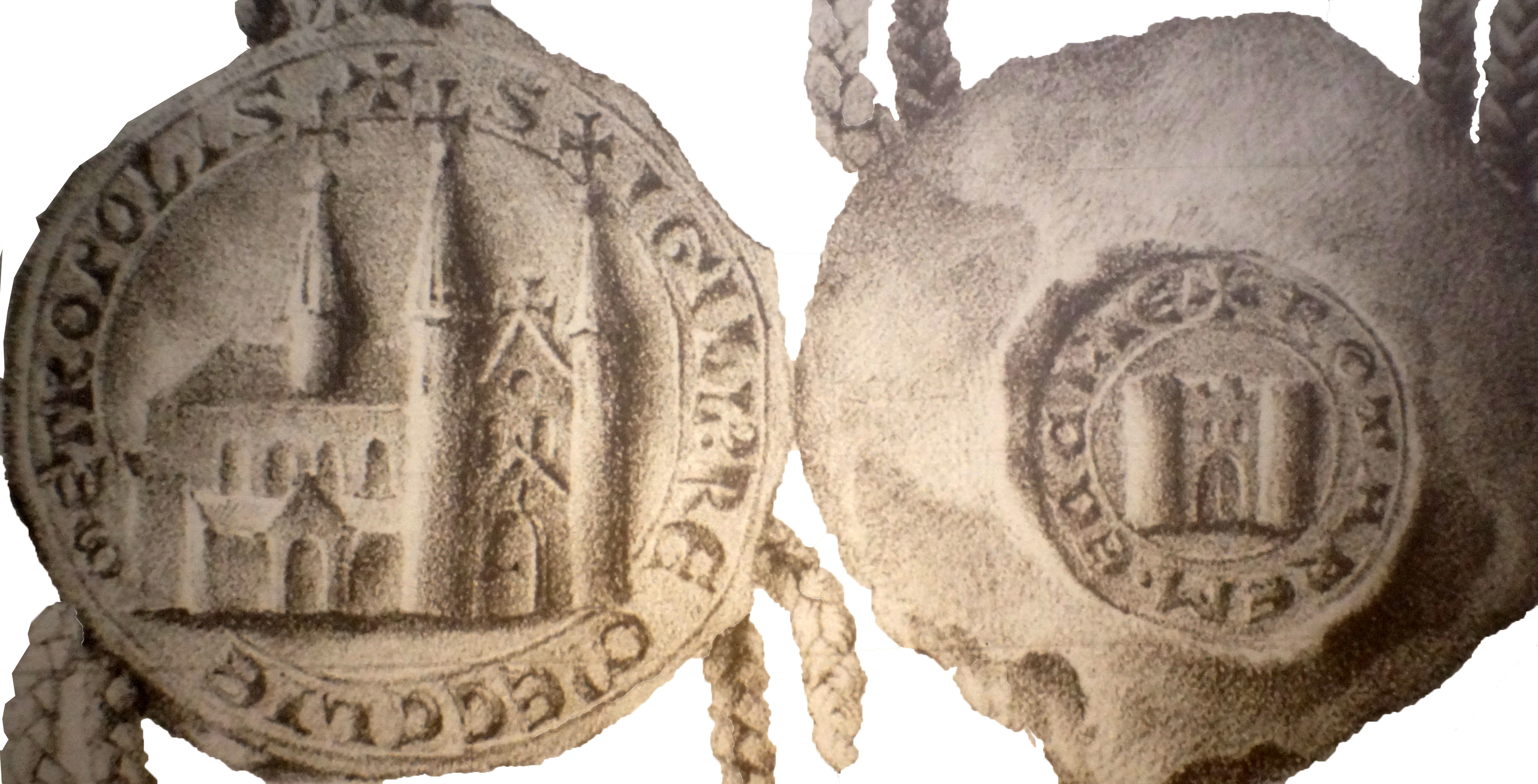
Seal of the cathedral, showing how it appeared in the 12th century

=== 13th–14th century – the High Gothic cathedral ===
On 6 May 1210, the partly Carolingian and partly Early Gothic cathedral was destroyed by fire, allegedly due to "carelessness." One year to the day afterwards, archbishop Aubrey laid the first stone of the new cathedral's chevet. The work on the new cathedral moved with exceptional speed, because Reims was one of the first buildings to use stones and other materials of standardised sizes, so each stone did not have to be cut to measure. In July 1221, the chapel at the east end of the cathedral entered use. In 1230, work began on the west front, indicating that the nave was nearly complete.

In 1233, a long-running dispute between the cathedral chapter and the townsfolk (regarding issues of taxation and legal jurisdiction) boiled over into open revolt. Several clerics were killed or injured during the resulting violence and the entire cathedral chapter fled the city, leaving it under an interdict (effectively banning all public worship and sacraments). Work on the new cathedral was suspended for three years, only resuming in 1236 after the clergy returned to the city and the interdict was lifted following mediation by the king and the pope. Construction then continued more slowly.

In 1241, the members of the Chapter were able to meet in the choir, showing that the vaults of the apse and the five last traverses of the nave on the east, where the stalls were located, were finished, but the nave was not roofed until 1299 (when the French king lifted the tax on lead used for that purpose). Work on the western façade did even not begin until 1252, and the portals were not completed until after 1260. Thereafter work moved from the west to the east, with the completion of the nave; the level of the rose windows was completed between 1275 and 1280. The roof of the nave and upper galleries were finished in 1299. A comparison of the roses of the western façade to the roses of the transepts demonstrates the temporal stylistic progress: the rose windows of the transepts are decorated by bar tracery, but all glass is inside the round frames – that is, a mix between Classic Gothic and High Gothic. In the rose windows of the western façade, however, the glass exceeds the round frames to fill the whole pointed-arched areas available (i.e. Rayonnant, an advanced form of High Gothic).

Unusually, the names of the cathedral's successive architects, succeeding each other until the completion of the cathedral's structural work in 1275, are known. A labyrinth built into floor of the nave at the time of construction or shortly after (similar to examples at Chartres and Amiens) included the names of these four master masons (Jean d'Orbais, Jean-le-Loup, Gaucher of Reims and Bernard de Soissons) and the number of years they worked there, though art historians still disagree over who was responsible for which parts of the building. The labyrinth itself was destroyed in 1779, but its details and inscriptions are known from 18th-century drawings. The clear association here between a labyrinth and master masons adds weight to the argument that such patterns were an allusion to the emerging status of the architect (through their association with the mythical architect Daedalus, who built the Cretan labyrinth of Minos). The cathedral also contains further evidence of the rising status of the architect in the tomb of Hugues Libergier (d. 1268, architect of the now-destroyed Reims church of St-Nicaise). Not only is he given the honour of an engraved slab; he is shown holding a miniature model of his church (an honour formerly reserved for noble donors) and wearing the academic garb befitting an intellectual.

Even after the structural work had been completed in 1275, a lot of work remained to be done. The Gallery of Kings on the west front, and the octagonal upper towers were not finished until the 1460s. Documentary records show the acquisition of land to the west of the site in 1218, suggesting the new cathedral was substantially larger than its predecessors, the lengthening of the nave presumably being an adaptation to afford room for the crowds that attended the coronations.

The towers, 81 m (266 ft) tall, were originally designed to rise 120 m (390 ft). The south tower holds just two great bells; one of them, named "Charlotte" by Charles, Cardinal of Lorraine in 1570, weighs more than 10,000 kg (10 t).

Following the death of the infant King John I, his uncle Philip was hurriedly crowned at Reims, 9 January 1317.

During the Hundred Years' War's Reims campaign the city was under siege by the English from 1359 to 1360, but the siege failed. In 1380, Reims Cathedral was the location of Charles VI's coronation and eight years later Charles called a council at Reims in 1388 to take personal rule from the control of his uncles.

=== 15th–16th century ===
After Henry V of England defeated Charles VI's army at the Battle of Agincourt on 25 October 1415, most of northern France including Reims fell to the English. They held Reims and the cathedral until 1429, when it was captured by Joan of Arc, allowing the dauphin Charles to be crowned king on 17 July 1429. For her feat – a turning point in the Hundred Years' War – Joan is memorialized at Reims Cathedral with two statues: an equestrian statue outside the church and another within the church.

On 24 July 1481, a fire caused by the negligence of workers covering the high wood-and-lead flèche (spire) that was being constructed over the transept destroyed the part of the spire's framework, the cathedral's central bell tower, and the galleries at the base of the cathedral roof, while dripping molten roofing lead caused further damage. However, recovery was quick with kings Charles VIII and Louis XII making donations to the cathedral's reconstruction. In particular, they granted the cathedral an octroi of the Gabelle salt tax. In gratitude, the new roof was adorned by fleur-de-lis and the royal coat of arms "affixed to the top of the façade". However, this work was suspended before the arrows were completed in 1516. The upper galleries of the nave were completed in 1505. These were so expensive that the remaining planned projects, including a 170-meter-tall (560 ft) bell tower over the transept, spires on the west front and the planned upper towers flanking the transept, were never built.

Following the death of Francis I, Henry II was crowned King of France on 25 July 1547 in Reims Cathedral.

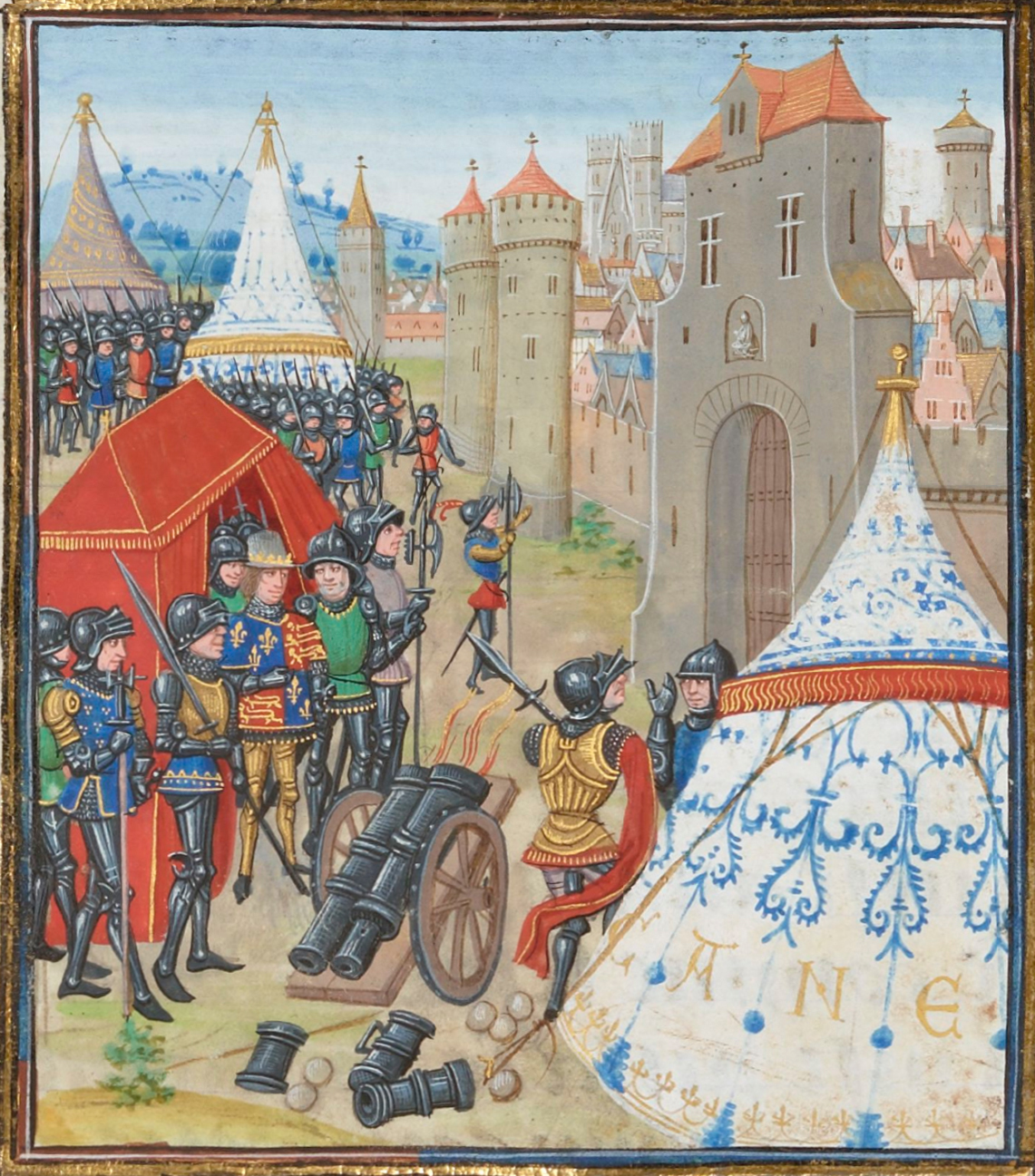
Edward III of England besieges Reims with cannons in the Reims Campaign of the Hundred Years' War. The cathedral is visible in the background.

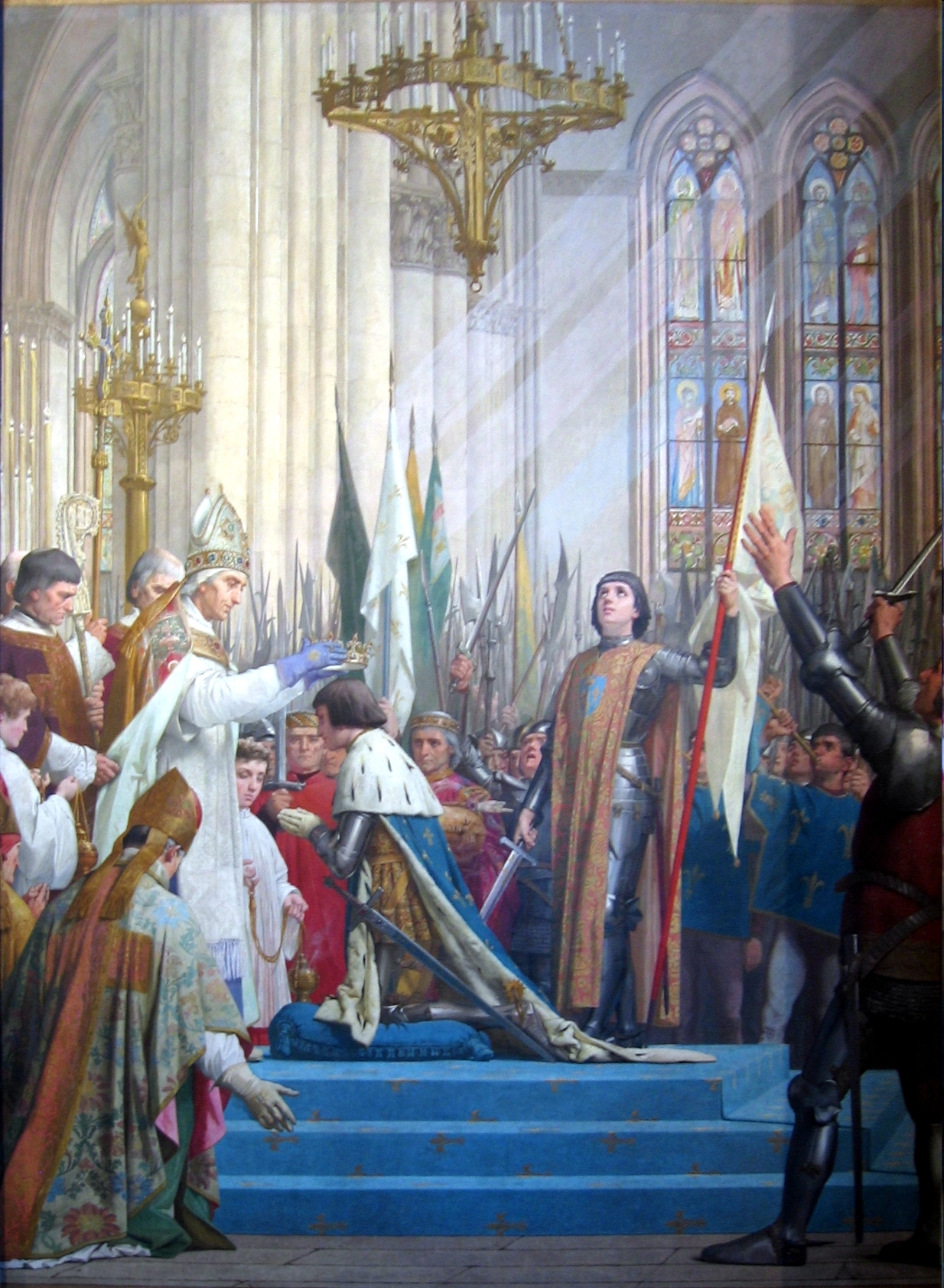
Coronation of Charles VII in 1429, by Jules Eugène Lenepveu, depicting St. Joan of Arc at right.

=== 17th–18th century ===
The 18th century saw the first major reconstruction inside the cathedral. Between 1741 and 1749, the lower windows and the medieval furniture, the principal altar, the choir stalls, and the choir screen were all replaced with furnishings more in keeping with the theological requirements and taste of the era. The sculpture of the portals was also restored.

In 1793, during the French Revolution, the cathedral was closed and briefly turned into a storehouse for grain, and then for a time into a pseudo 'temple of reason'. Most of the remaining furniture and funeral monuments were destroyed, the reliquaries in the treasury melted down for the gold, and the bells melted down to make cannon. Mobs hammered much of the sculpture of the grand portal and the more evident symbols of royalty, such as the fleur-de-lis emblems, and the royal Hand of Justice were burned. However, most of the medieval sculpture survived relatively intact.

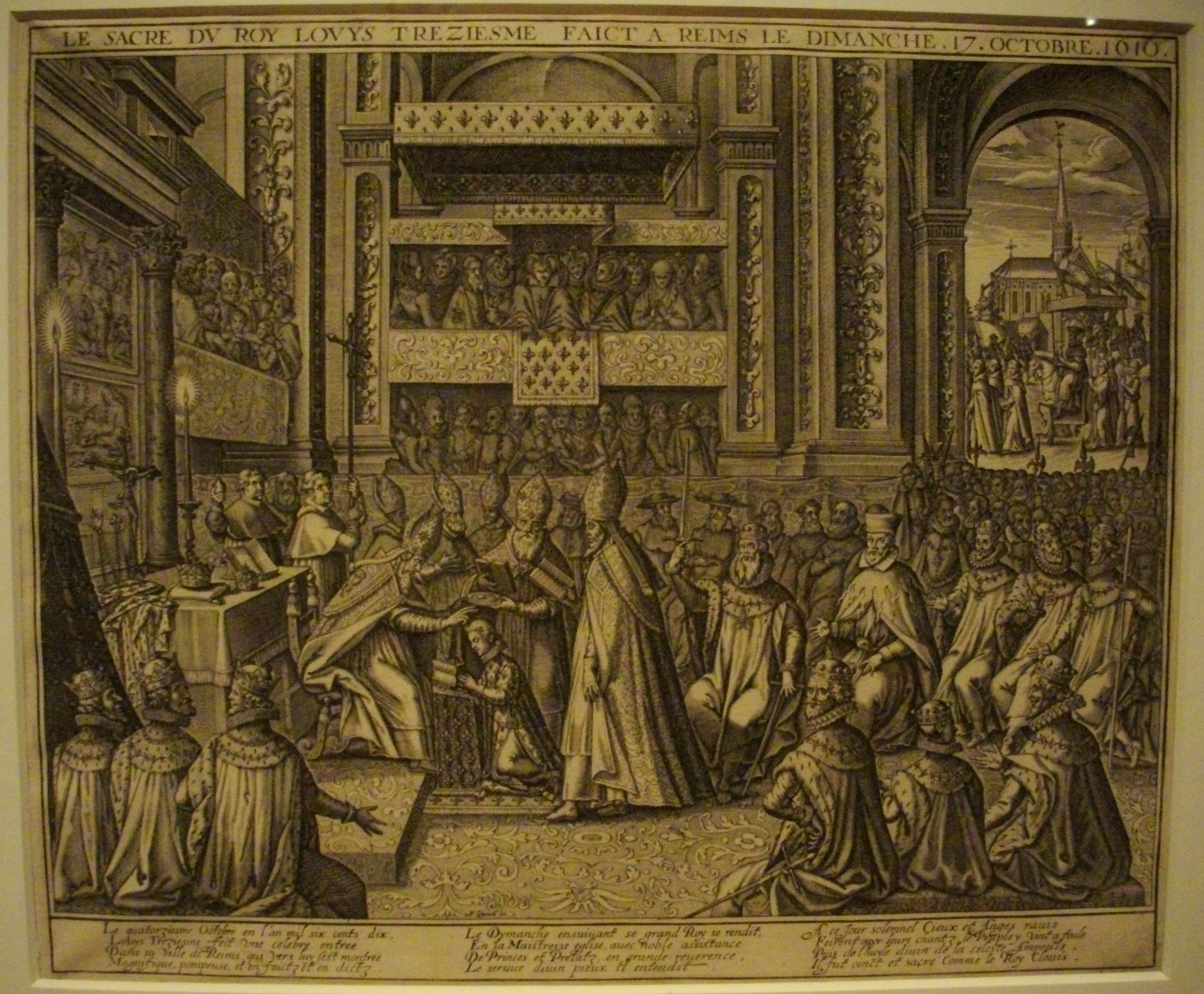
Coronation of Louis XIII, October 17, 1610

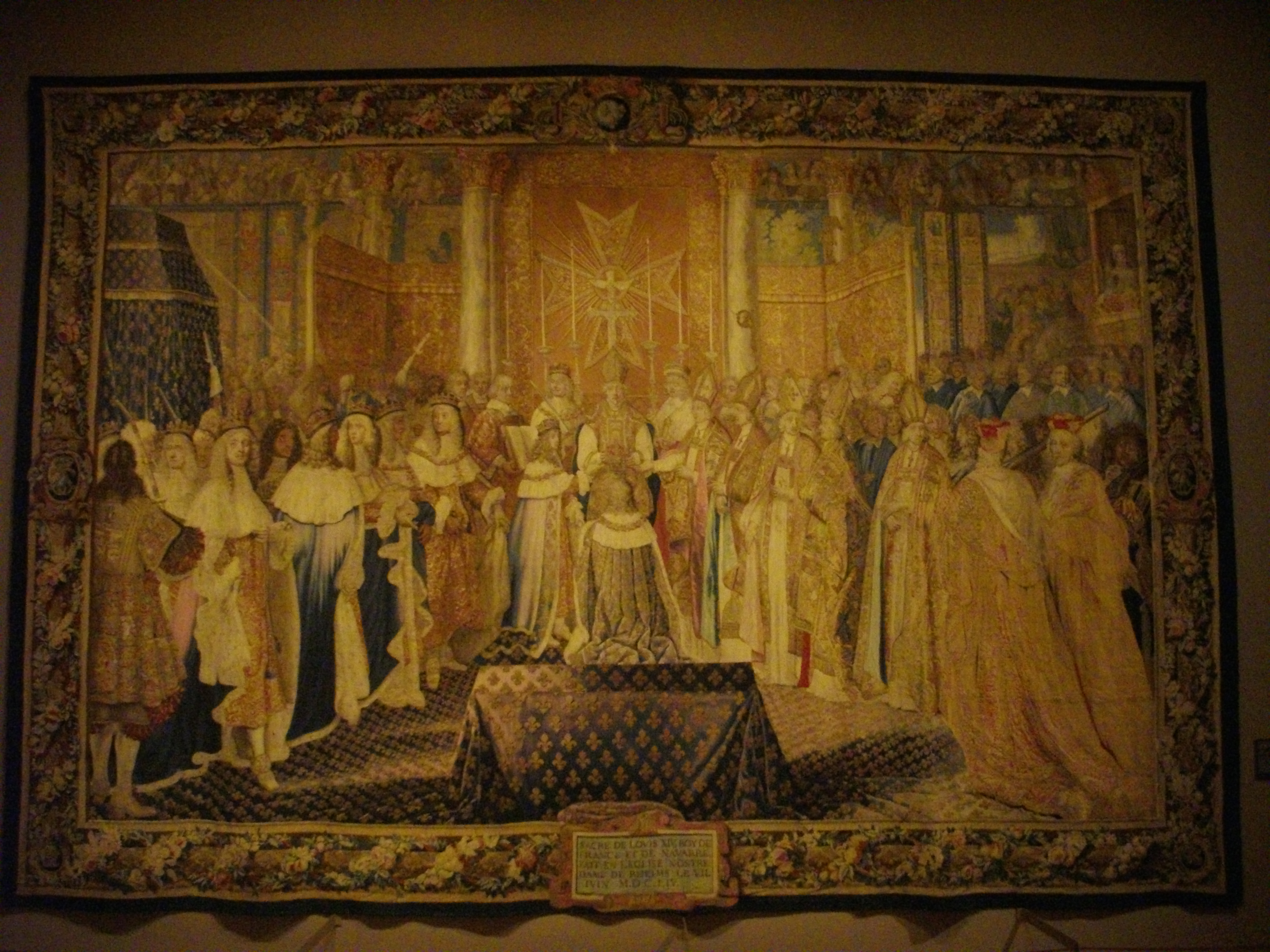
Coronation of Louis XIV, June 7, 1654

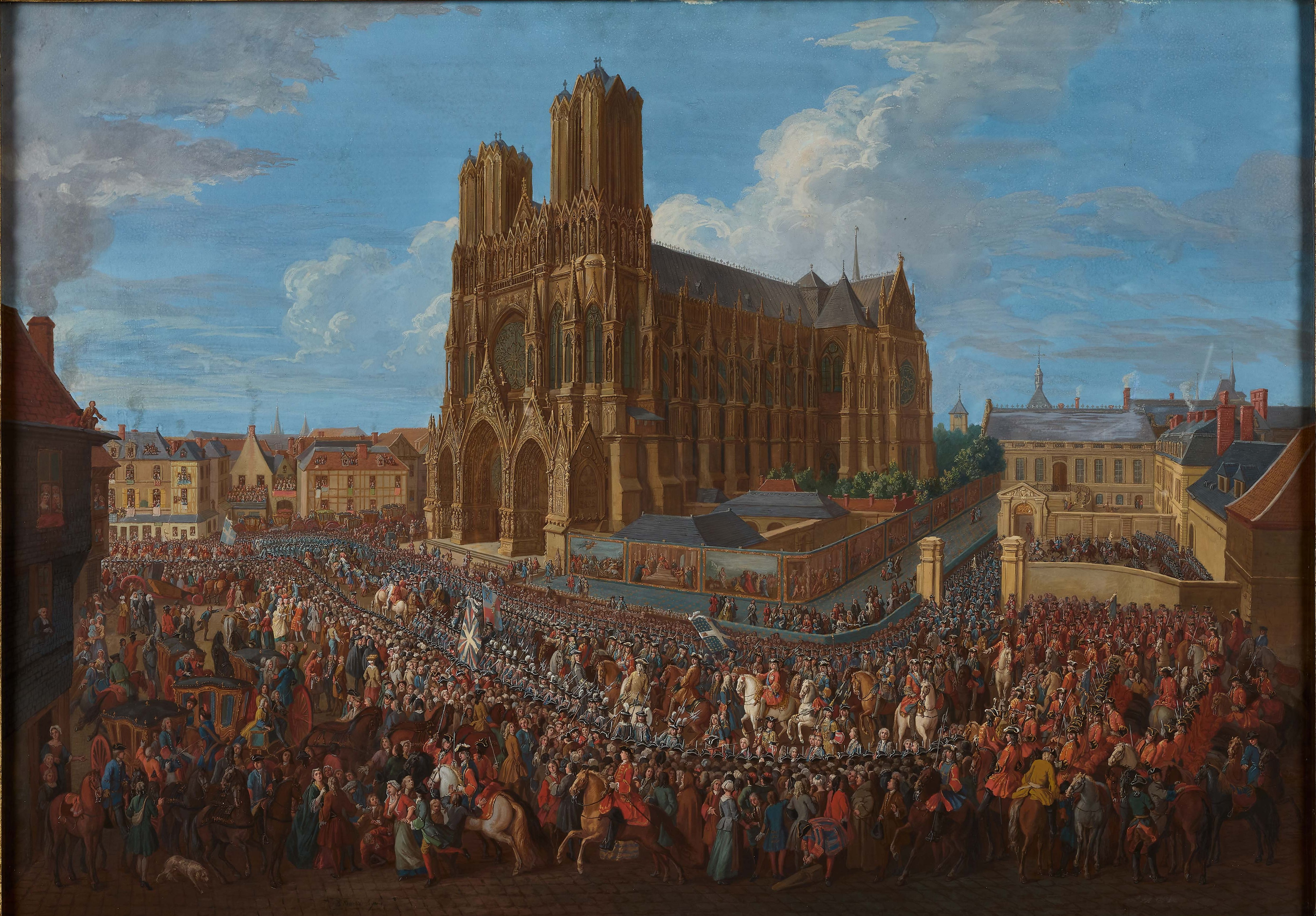
Coronation procession of Louis XV (1724)

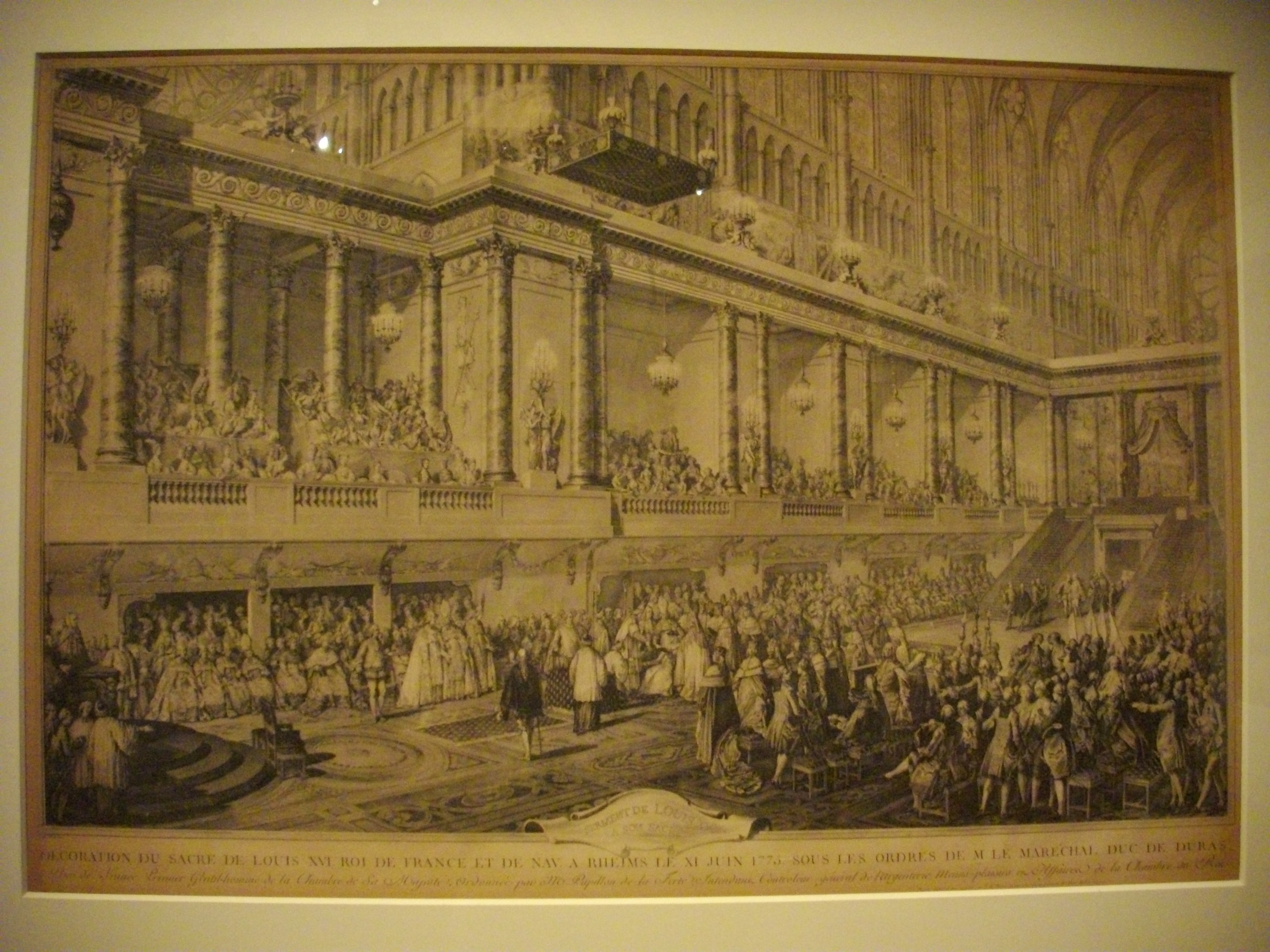
Coronation of Louis XVI (1775)

=== 19th century ===
With the restoration of the French monarchy after the downfall of Napoleon, the practice of royal coronations at Reims resumed, but only briefly. The last king of France to be crowned there was Charles X in 1825. His reign was deeply unpopular in Paris, and he was overthrown in the Revolution of 1830 and replaced by a constitutional monarch, Louis Philippe I, who was sworn in at the Parliament in Paris rather than crowned in Reims.

A series of restoration projects were carried out in the later 19th century, focusing first on the gables and statues on the west front (1826–30), and then the upper galleries, windows and towers (1845–60), under Jean-Jacques Arveuf. In 1860 He was replaced by Eugène Viollet-le-Duc, who modified the gallery of the choir and the apse closer to their original medieval appearance. He was succeeded by two more architects, Eugene Millet and Victor Ruprich-Robert, who took considerable liberties in remaking the galleries of the nave in a more imaginative 13th-century Gothic style. In 1888. they were followed by Denis Darcy and Paul Gout, who followed more closely the historic architecture, particularly in the restoration of the west rose window.

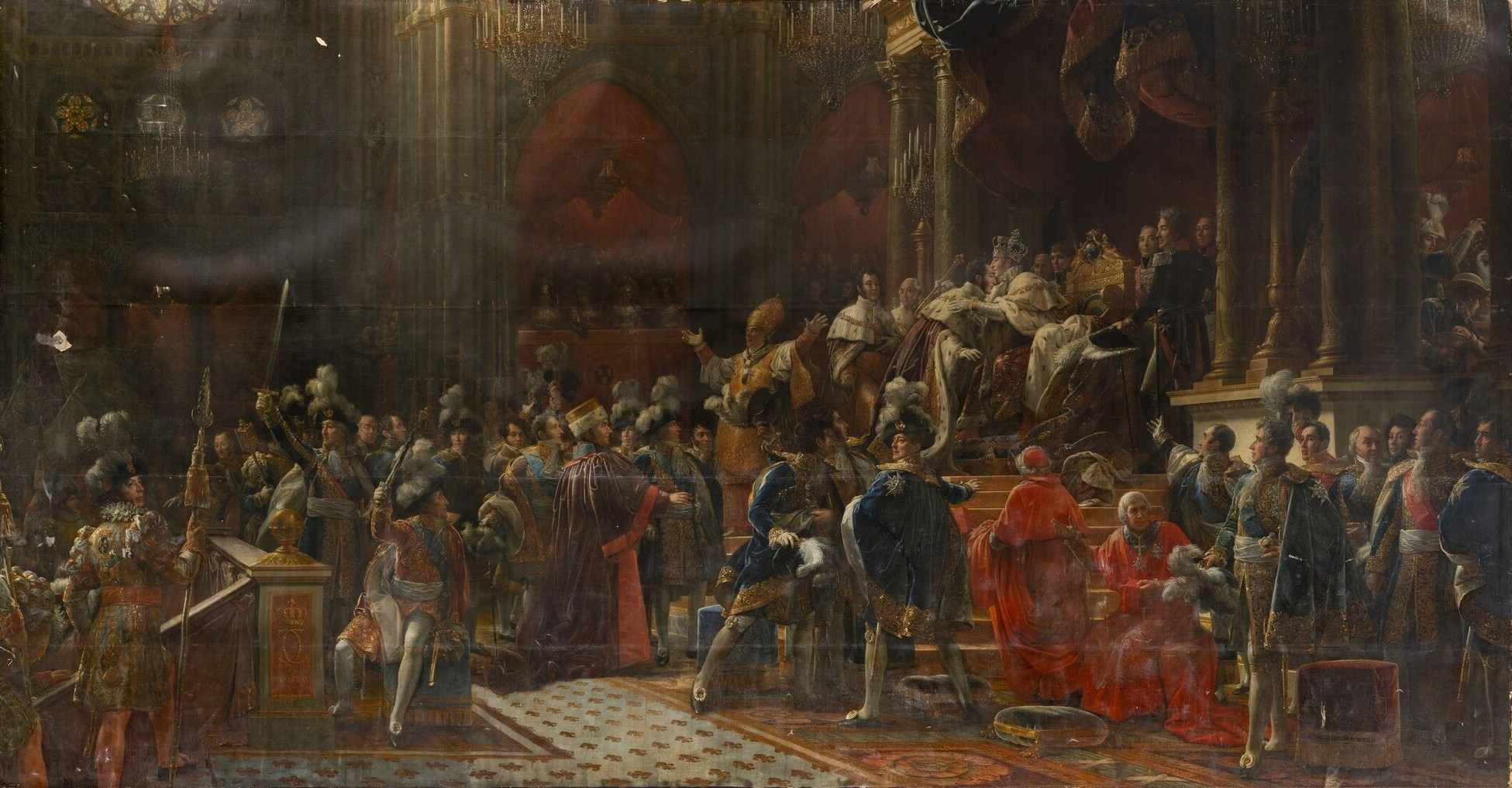
Coronation of Charles X of France at Reims in 1825 by François Gérard

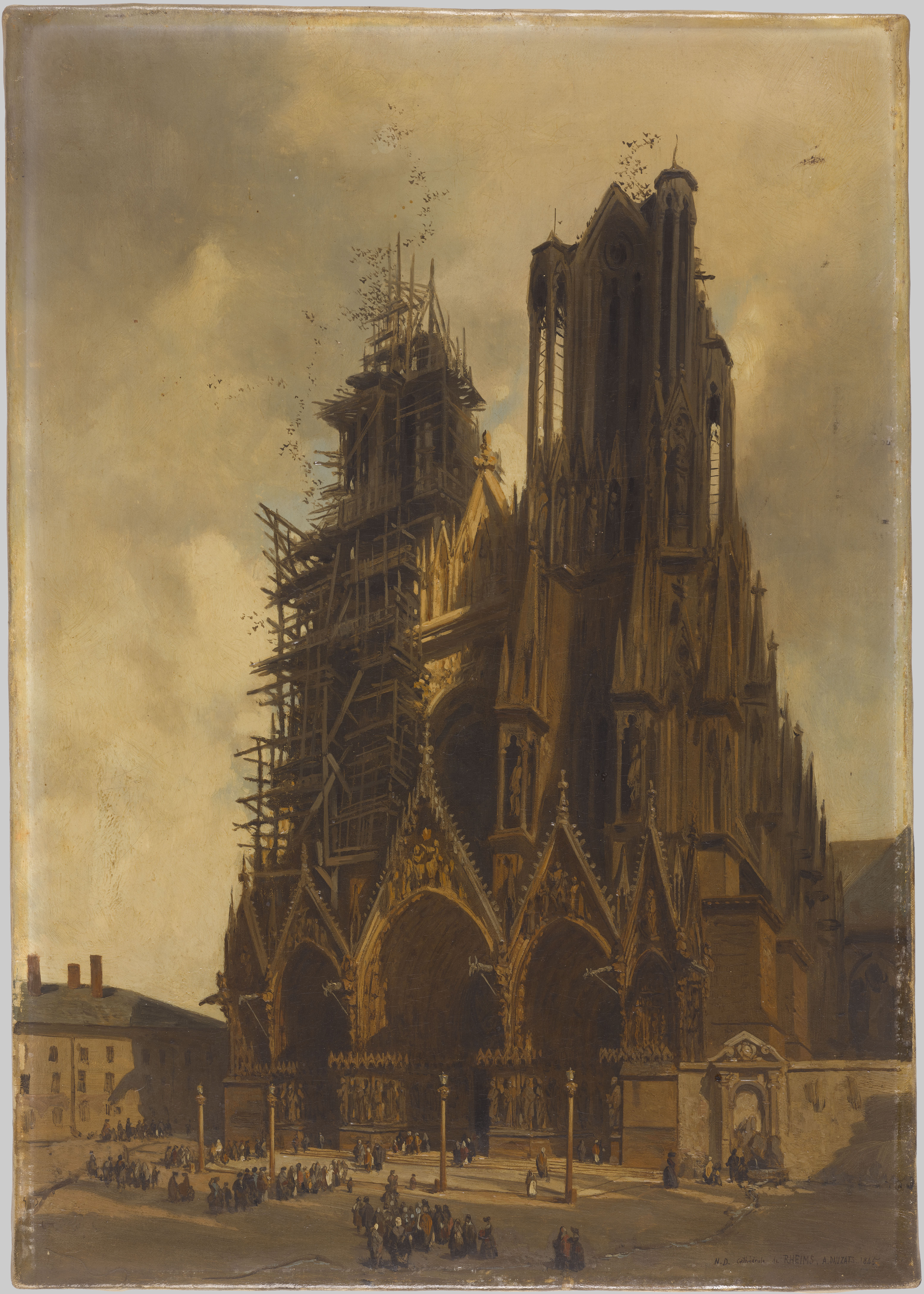
Reims Cathedral under restoration in 1845, by Adrien Dauzats

=== 20th century – First World War and restoration ===
On the outbreak of the First World War, the cathedral was commissioned as a hospital, and troops and arms were removed from its immediate vicinity. On 4 September 1914, the XII Saxon corps arrived at the city and later that day the Imperial German Army began shelling the city. (Note: According to Maurice Landrieux, then Bishop of Dijon, the German shelling began an hour after he had finished that Friday's sermon. A white flag was said by Bishop Landrieux to have mounted from the north tower of the cathedral by the vicar and an M. Rouné. This flag remained at the top of the tower through the short German occupation of the city and was replaced with the French tricolor on 12 September 1914.) The guns, located 7 km (4.3 mi) away in Les Mesneux, ceased firing when the XII Saxon Corps sent two officers and a city employee to ask them to stop shelling the city.

On 12 September, the occupying German Army decided to place their wounded in the cathedral over the protests of the Abbe Maurice Landrieux, and spread 15,000 bales of straw on the floor of the cathedral for this purpose. The next day French soldiers under General Franchet d'Esperey re-entered the city, but German wounded were left in the cathedral.

Six days later, a shell exploded in the bishop's palace, killing three and injuring 15. On 18 September a prolonged bombardment began and on the 19th shells struck the "forest" of wooden timbers under the lead-covered roof, setting it on fire, and completely destroying the roof. The bells melted, windows were blown out, and the sculpture and parts of the walls were damaged. The lead in the roofing melted and poured through the mouths of the stone gargoyles, damaging, in turn, the adjoining bishop's palace. Images of the cathedral in ruins were shown during the war by the indignant French, accusing the Germans of the deliberate destruction of buildings rich in national and cultural heritage, while German propaganda blamed the deaths of prisoners on the French, who at gunpoint prevented them fleeing the fire. Single shells continued to strike the ruined building for several years, despite repeated pleas by Pope Benedict XV.

At the end of the war, it was proposed to keep the cathedral in its damaged state as a monument to victims of the war, but this idea was finally rejected. A major restoration project began in 1919, led by Henri Deneux, chief architect of the service of French historic monuments. The restoration received major funding from the Rockefeller Foundation, and sometimes made use of modern techniques and materials, including prefabricated reinforced concrete, to strengthen the structure. In the 1920s, the foundations of the earlier church from the Carolingian period were discovered under the cathedral and excavated. The work was completed and the cathedral was reopened in 1938.

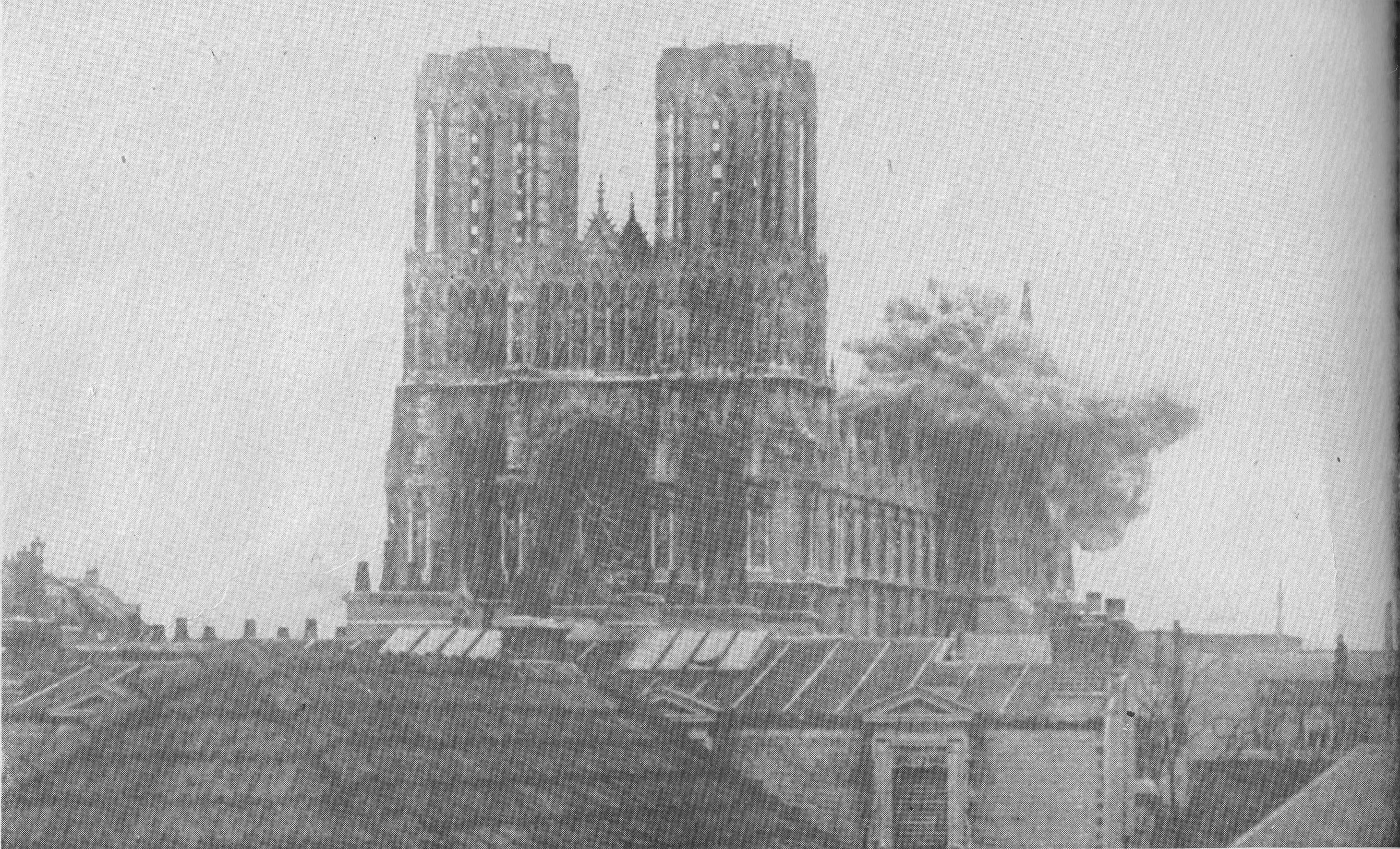
Bombardment of the cathedral (1914)

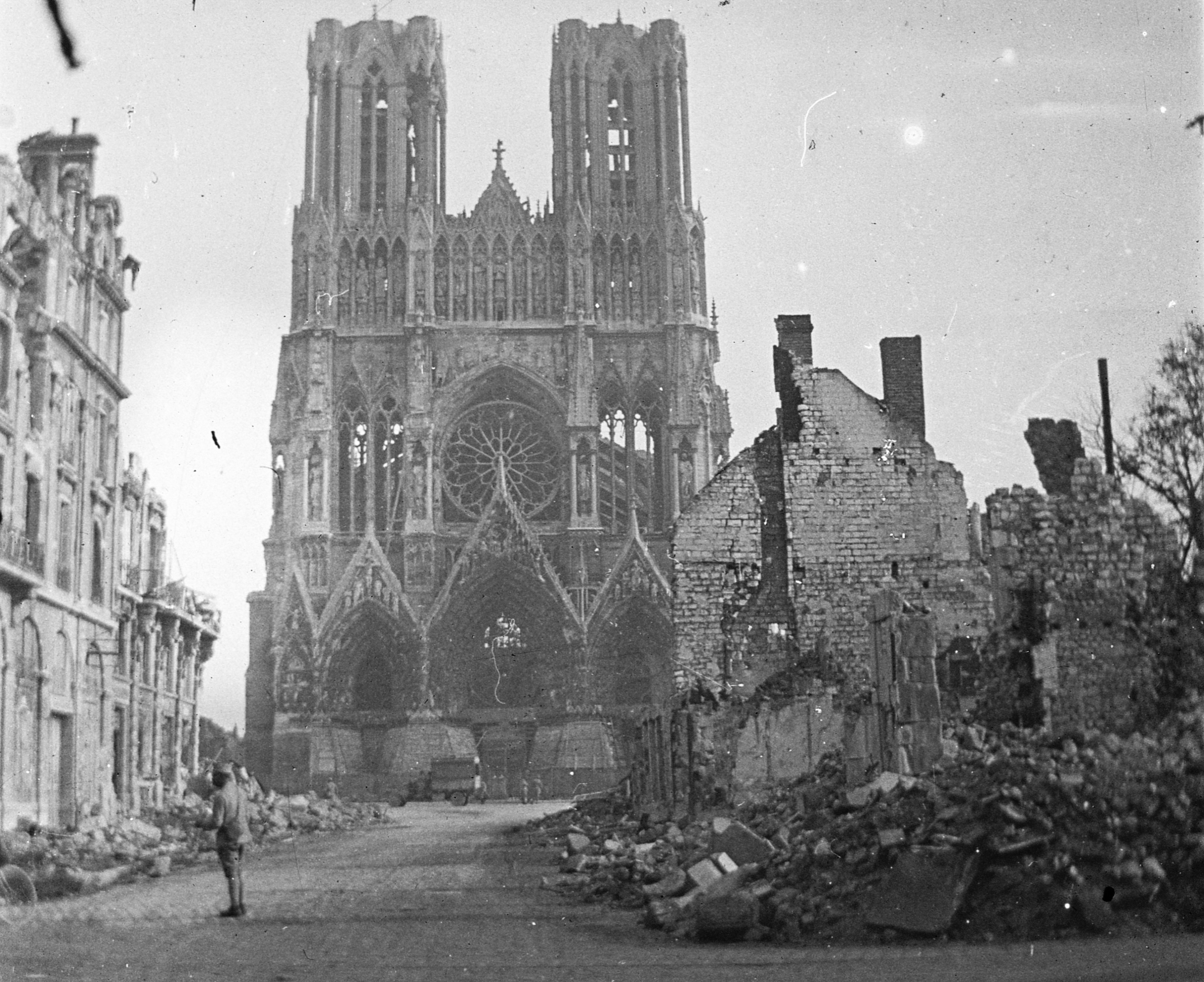
The façade of the cathedral after bombardment

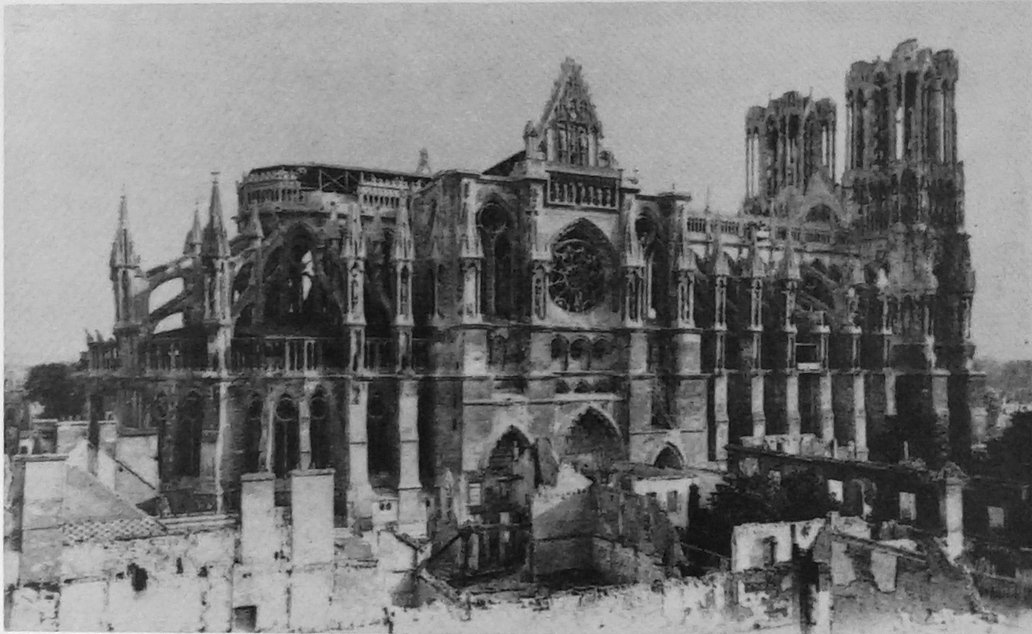
The cathedral, without its roof, after the bombardment

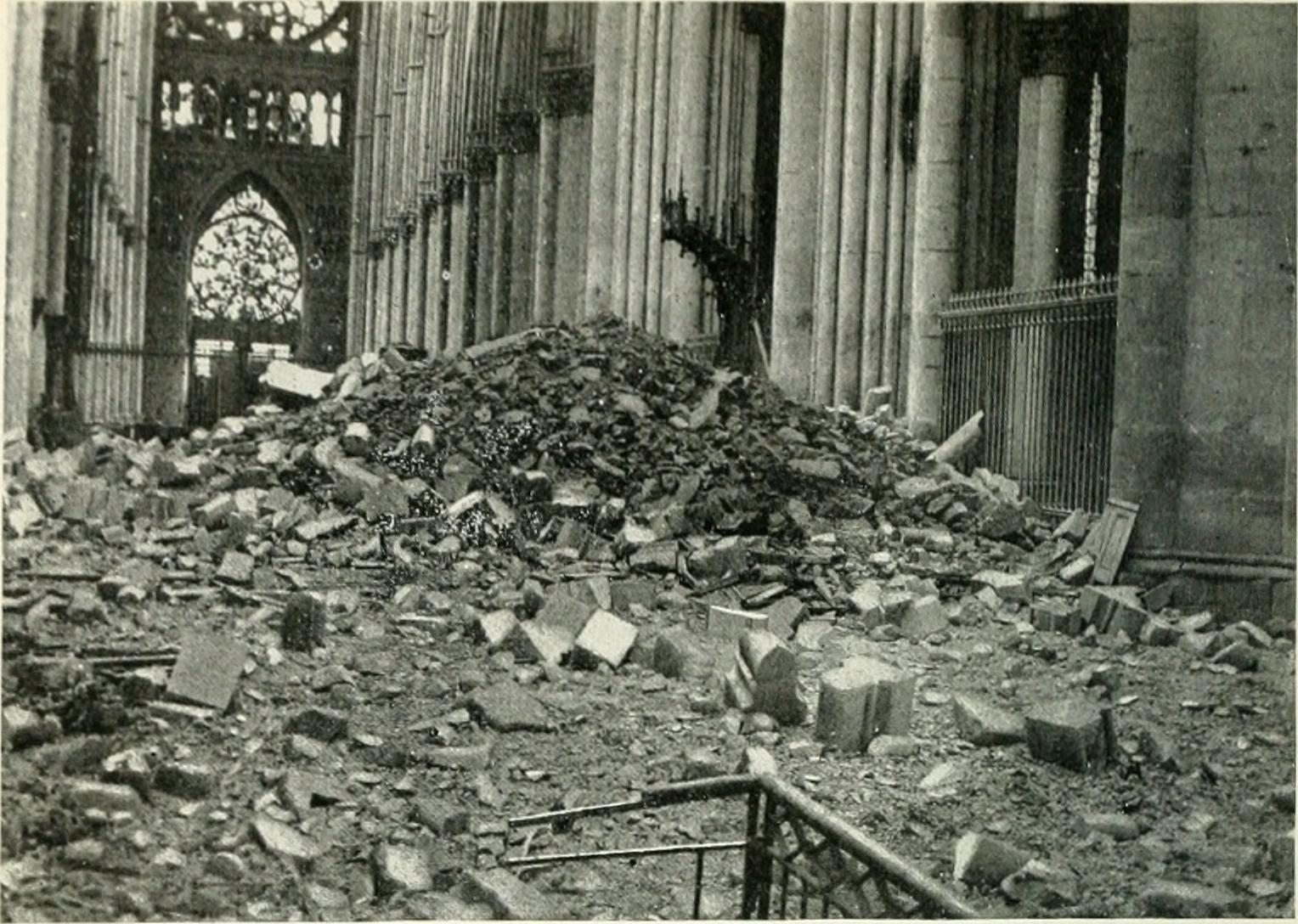
Interior of the cathedral after the bombardment

Restoration work on the church has continued since 1938, repairing the damage caused by the war and by pollution. In 1955 Georges Saupique made a copy of the Coronation of the Virgin, which can be seen above the cathedral entrance and with Louis Leygue copied many of the other sculptures on the cathedral façade. He also executed a statue of St Thomas for the north tower.

Beginning in 1967, many of the statues from the exterior, such as the smiling angel, were moved to the interior of the Tau Palace for protection, and replaced by copies.

The Franco-German reconciliation was symbolically formalized in July 1962 by French president Charles de Gaulle and German chancellor Konrad Adenauer, where, in 1914, the Imperial German Army deliberately shelled the cathedral in order to shake French morale.

The cathedral, former Abbey of Saint-Remi, and the Palace of Tau were added to the list of UNESCO World Heritage Sites in 1991.

On his 74th Pastoral Visit, Pope St. John Paul II visited Reims on 26 September 1996 for the 1500th anniversary of the baptism of King Clovis. While there, the pope prayed in the same chapel where St. Jean-Baptiste de La Salle celebrated his first Mass in 1678.

On 8 October 2016, a plaque bearing the names of the 31 kings crowned in Reims was placed in the cathedral in the presence of Archbishop Thierry Jordan and Prince Louis-Alphonse, Duke of Anjou, the main of the three pretenders to the French throne.

== Timeline ==
- c. 250–300 – Saint Sixtus of Reims is recorded as the first bishop of Reims
- 314 – A Cathedral of the Holy Apostles, built by Bishop Bétause, recorded at site of the Church of Saint-Symphorien
- 420 – Bishop Nicasius builds a new cathedral, dedicated to the Virgin Mary, at the present site
- 496 – Clovis the king of the Franks, is baptised by Bishop Remi
- 816 – King Louis the Pious is crowned in the cathedral
- 848 – Construction of new cathedral begins
- 862 – New cathedral consecrated
- 1140–1160 – Archbishop Samson rebuilds the west front and the choir
- 1208 – First stone of new cathedral placed by Archbishop Aubry de Humbert
- 1241 – Completion of the choir, apse, east part of nave, north portal and most of transept
- 1252 – Land obtained for the new west front
- 1299 – Roof of the nave completed
- 1300–1350 – Gallery of Kings constructed
- 1430–1460 – Construction of the upper west front towers
- 1481 – A fire destroys the roof and the spire of the transept
- 1504 – Completion of reconstruction after fire
- 1580 – South rose window destroyed by hurricane
- 1611 – Restoration of the west portals
- 1737 – Repair of the west façade and sculpture
- 1741–1749 – Removal of medieval furniture and redecoration in classical style
- 1793 – During French Revolution, treasury pillaged, and cathedral turned into storage barn for fodder
- 1825–1830 – Restoration of the west portals
- 1845–1860 – Restoration of upper church and towers
- 1850–1879 – Apse restored by Eugène Viollet-le-Duc
- 1875–1880 – Restoration of galleries of the nave
- 1914–1918 – Cathedral, near the front lines of World War I, struck by more than three hundred artillery shells
- 1918–1937 – Repair of war damage and new archeological excavations
- 1962 – President Charles de Gaulle and German chancellor Konrad Adenauer commemorate Franco-German reconciliation in the cathedral
- 1986 – Restoration of north portal completed
- 1996 – Pope John Paul II commemorates 1500th anniversary of baptism of Clovis at the cathedral
- 2011 – Restoration of west portals begun
- 2014 – Beginning of restoration of west rose window

== Plan ==
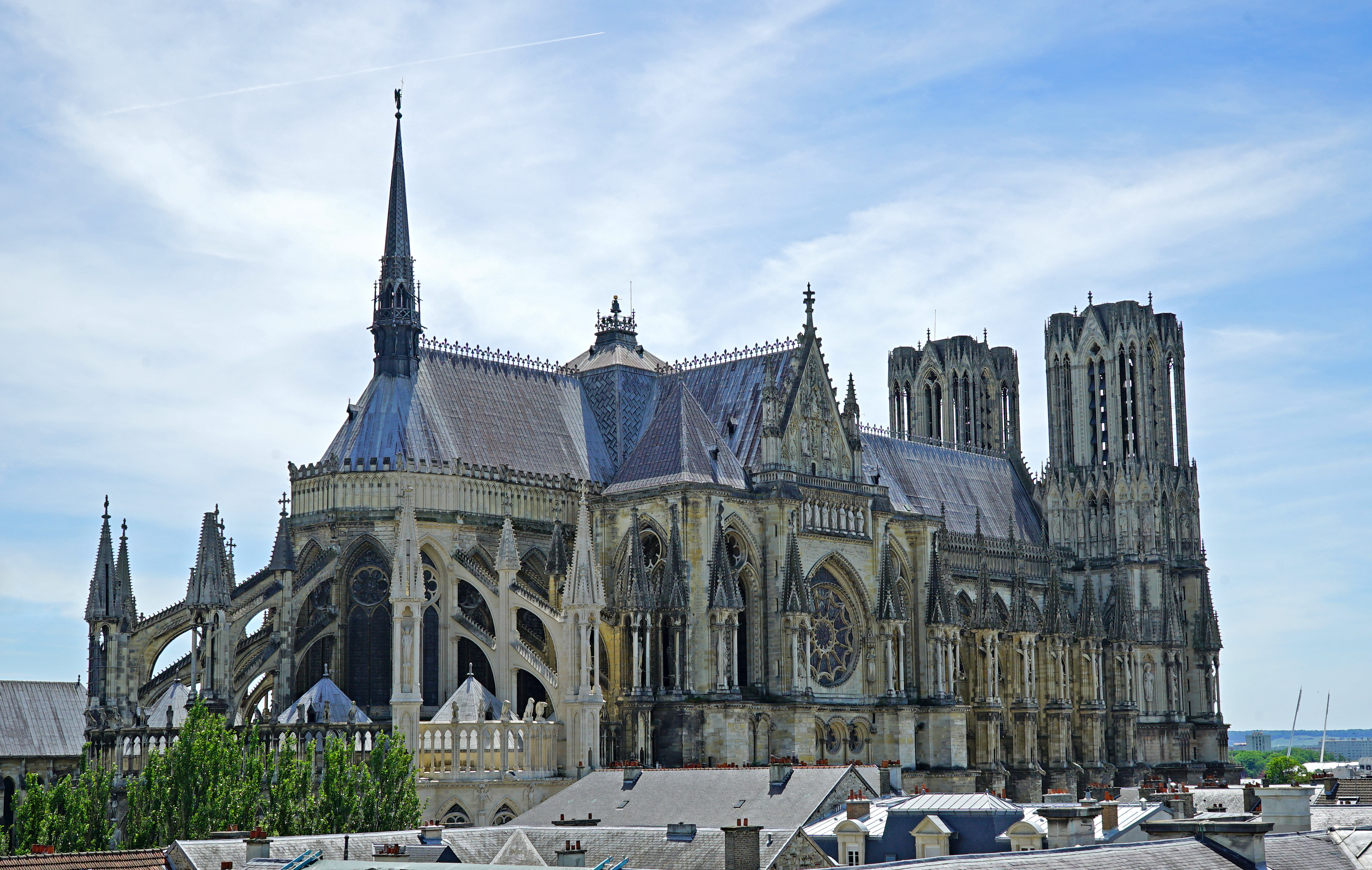
Apse (left), transept (centre), nave and west front (right)

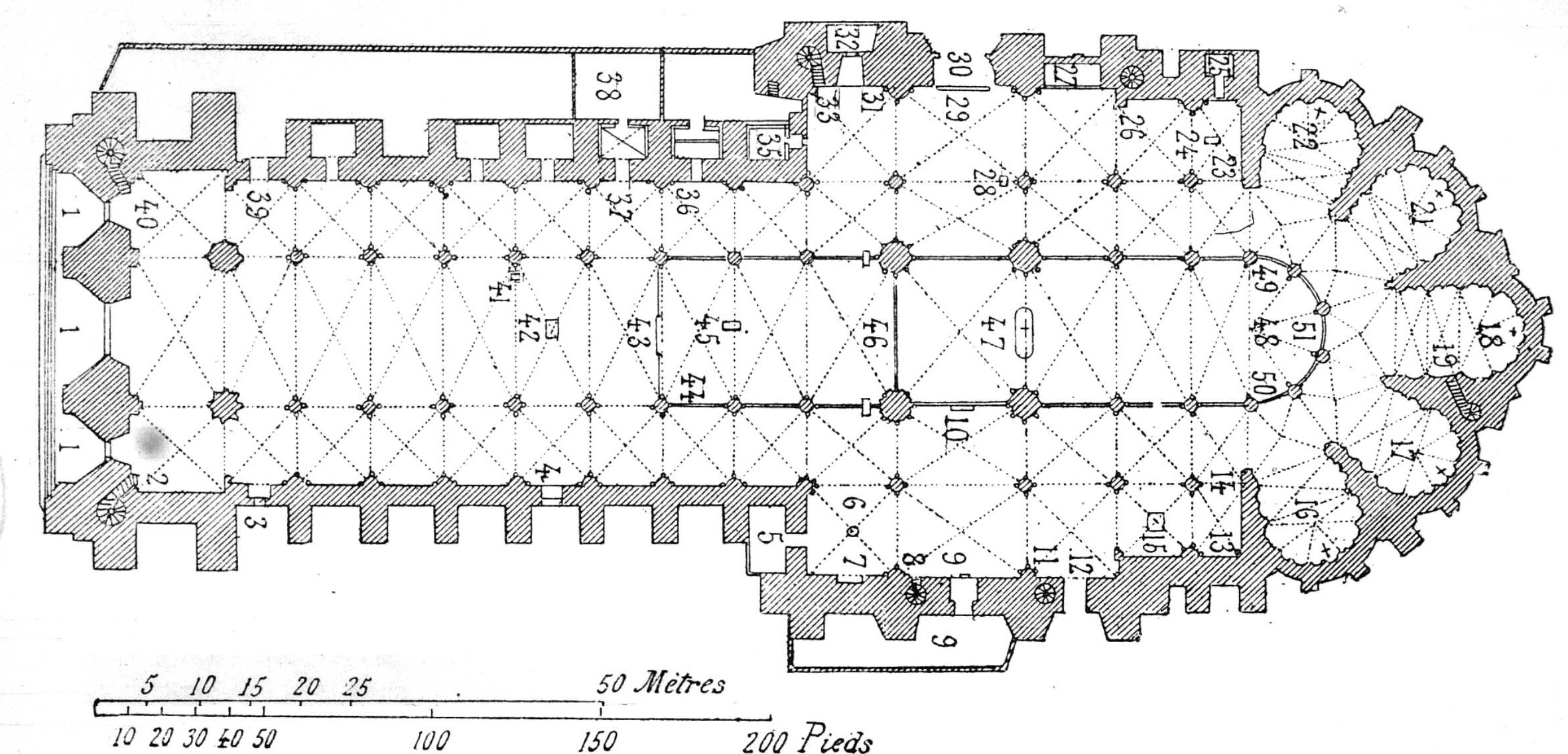
Plan of the cathedral

== Exterior ==
=== West façade ===
The west façade, the entry to the cathedral, particularly glorifies royalty. Most of it was completed at the same time, giving it an unusual unity of style. It is harmonic or balanced, with two towers of equal height and three portals entering into the nave. The porches of the portals, with archivolts containing many sculptures, protrude from the main wall.

Above and slightly behind the central portal is a large rose window at the level of the clerestory, with tall arched windows flanked by statuary under pointed canopies projected forward. Above this level is the gallery of kings, composed of 56 statues with a height of 4.5 m (15 ft), with Clovis I, the first Christian king of the Franks, in the center, Clotilde to his right, and Saint Remigius to his left. The two bell towers were originally planned to have spires making them three times taller than the nave, but these were never rebuilt.

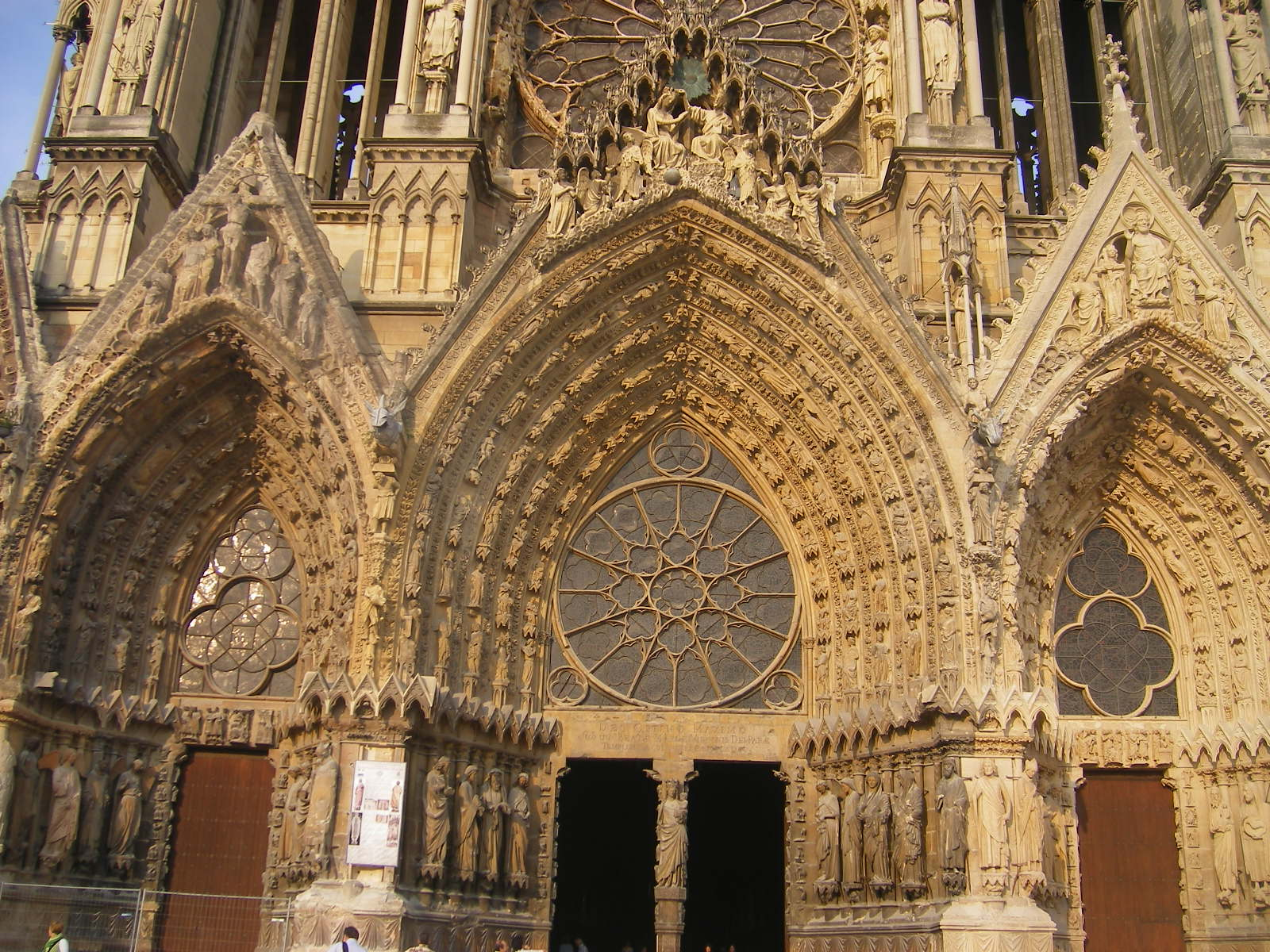
West façade and portals

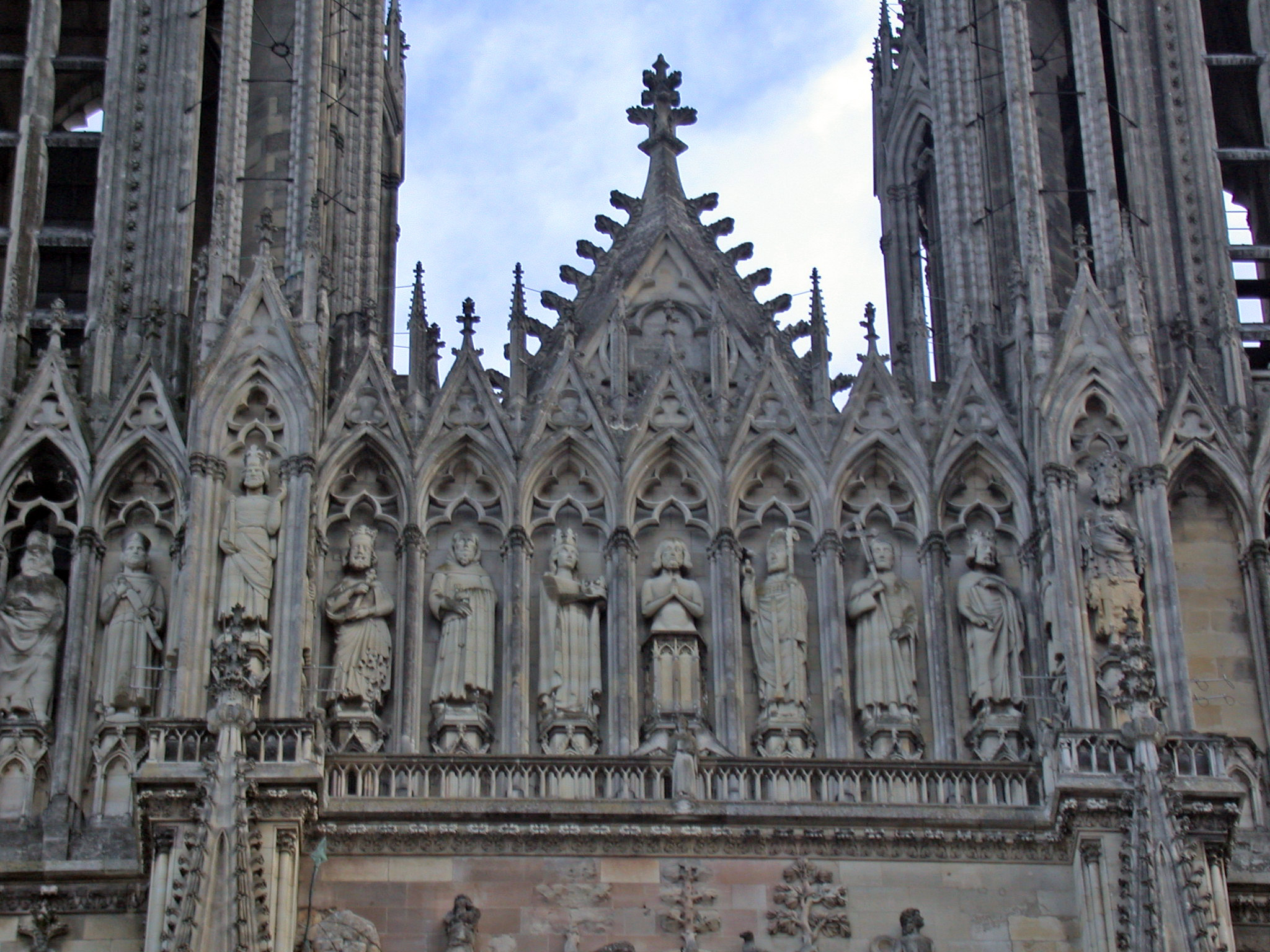
Gallery of kings

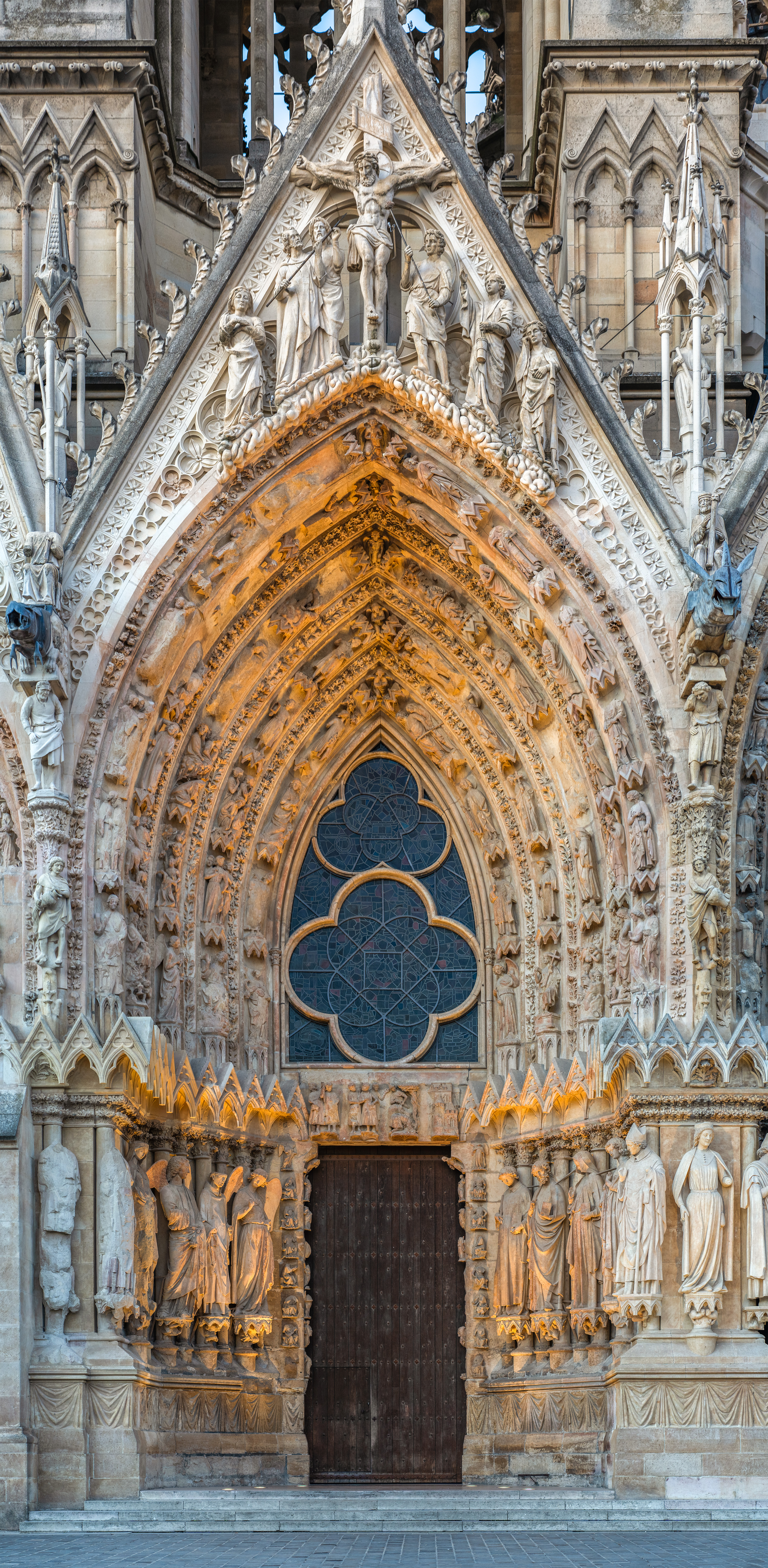
Reims, Notre-Dame Cathedral. West facade, left portal (circa 1230–1255)

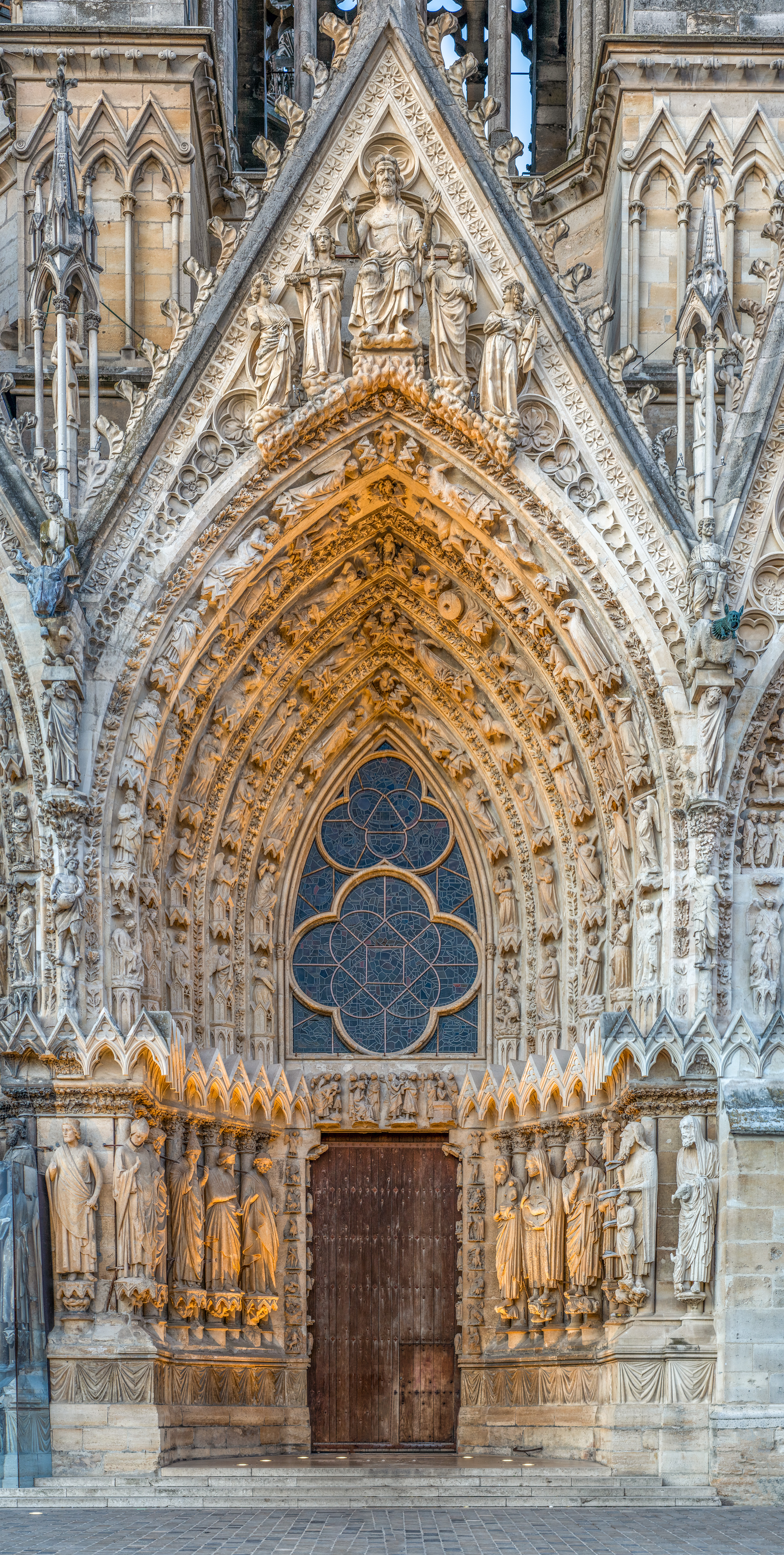
Reims, Notre-Dame Cathedral. West facade, right portal (circa 1230–1255)

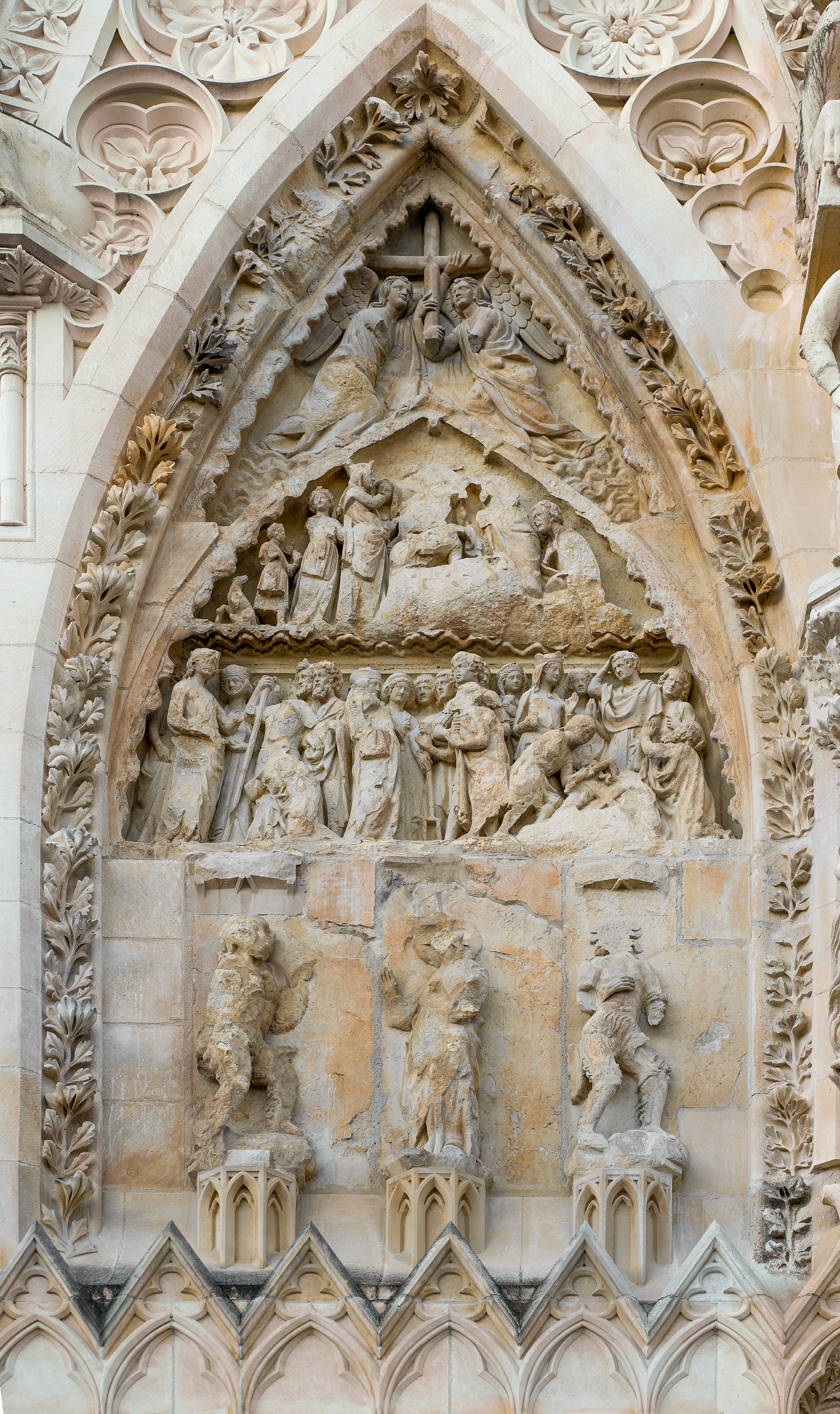
Relief on the west side of the north pillar of the west portal of Notre-Dame Cathedral in Reims

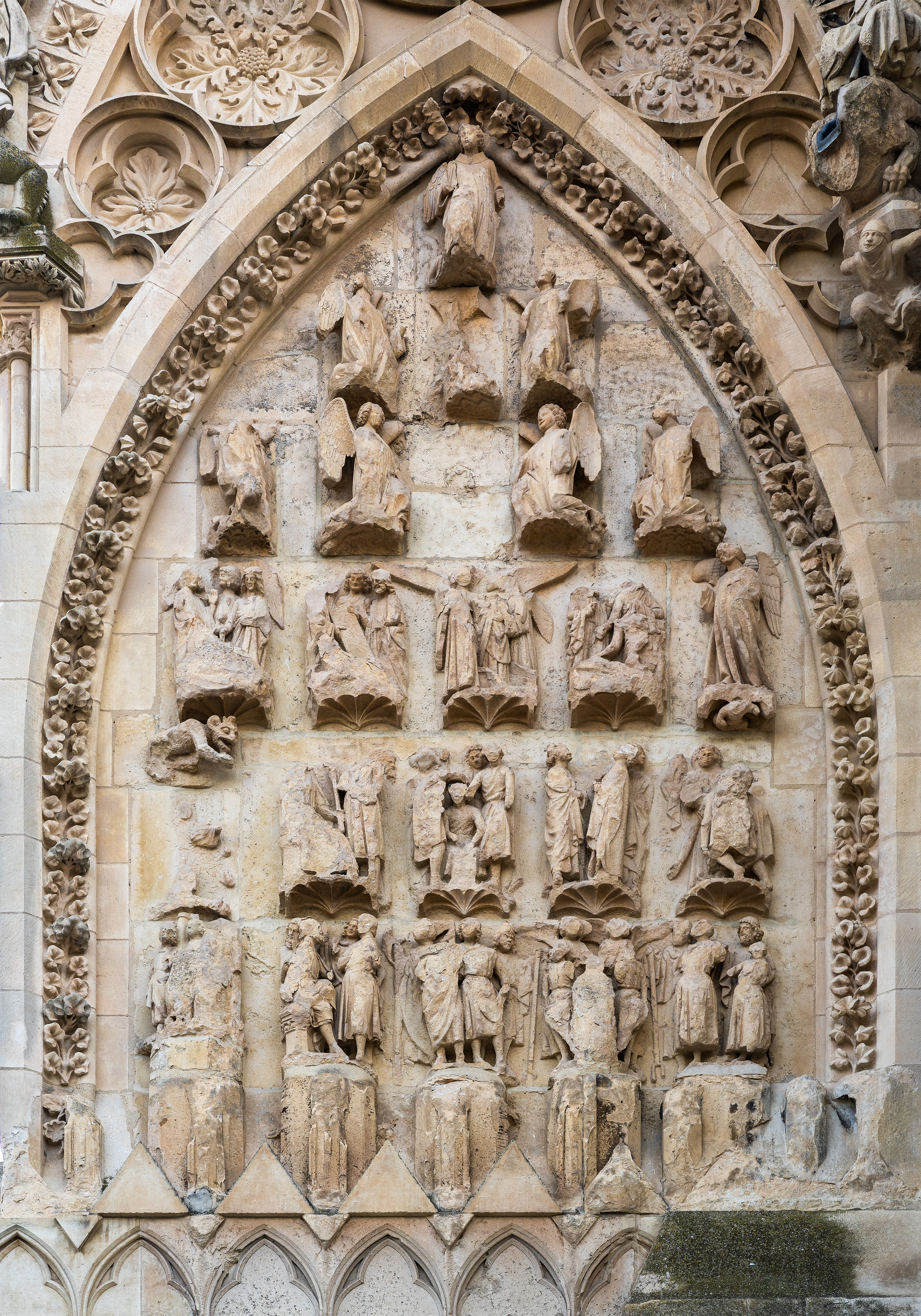
Southern relief on the south pillar of the west portal of Notre-Dame Cathedral in Reims

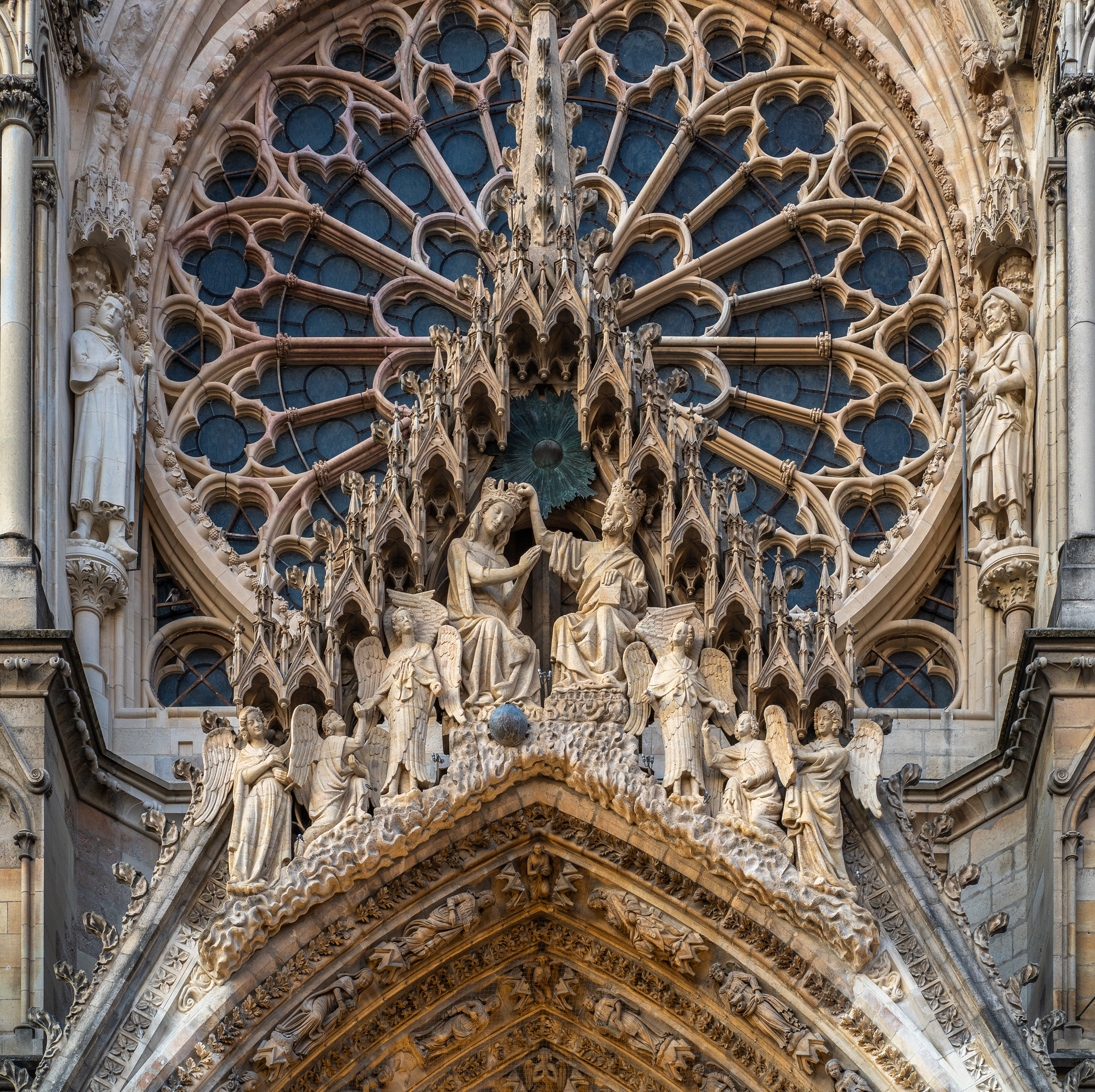
Notre-Dame Cathedral in Reims. Gable depicting the Coronation of the Virgin (probably between 1245 and 1255)

=== West portals ===
The three portals contain an elaborate sculptural program that illustrates to the illiterate churchgoers the messages of the Bible. The central portal is devoted to the Virgin Mary, the patron of the cathedral. The principal scene under the gable of the top of the portal shows the symbolic marriage of Christ with his church, represented by Mary. Mary is also the figure on the statue-column in the centre of the doorway.

The statuary of the south portal depicts the Last Judgement and the Apocalypse of John, the only major Gothic cathedral to combine these two themes. The figure of Christ passing judgement is placed under the gable over the top of the portal, with angels carrying symbols of the Passion of Christ. Other figures represent the Four Horsemen of the Apocalypse, as well as a multitude of angels, and allegorical symbols of the vices and virtues.

The sculpture of the north portal depicts the Crucifixion of Christ, which is shown under the gable at the top of the portal; other scenes show the Resurrection, and the Ascension of Jesus to heaven. To the left of the north portal is one of the most recognisable of all the sculptures of Reims, the Smiling Angel, Gabriel, with Mary, on the north side. The angel was damaged during the First World War, but repaired and returned to its place.

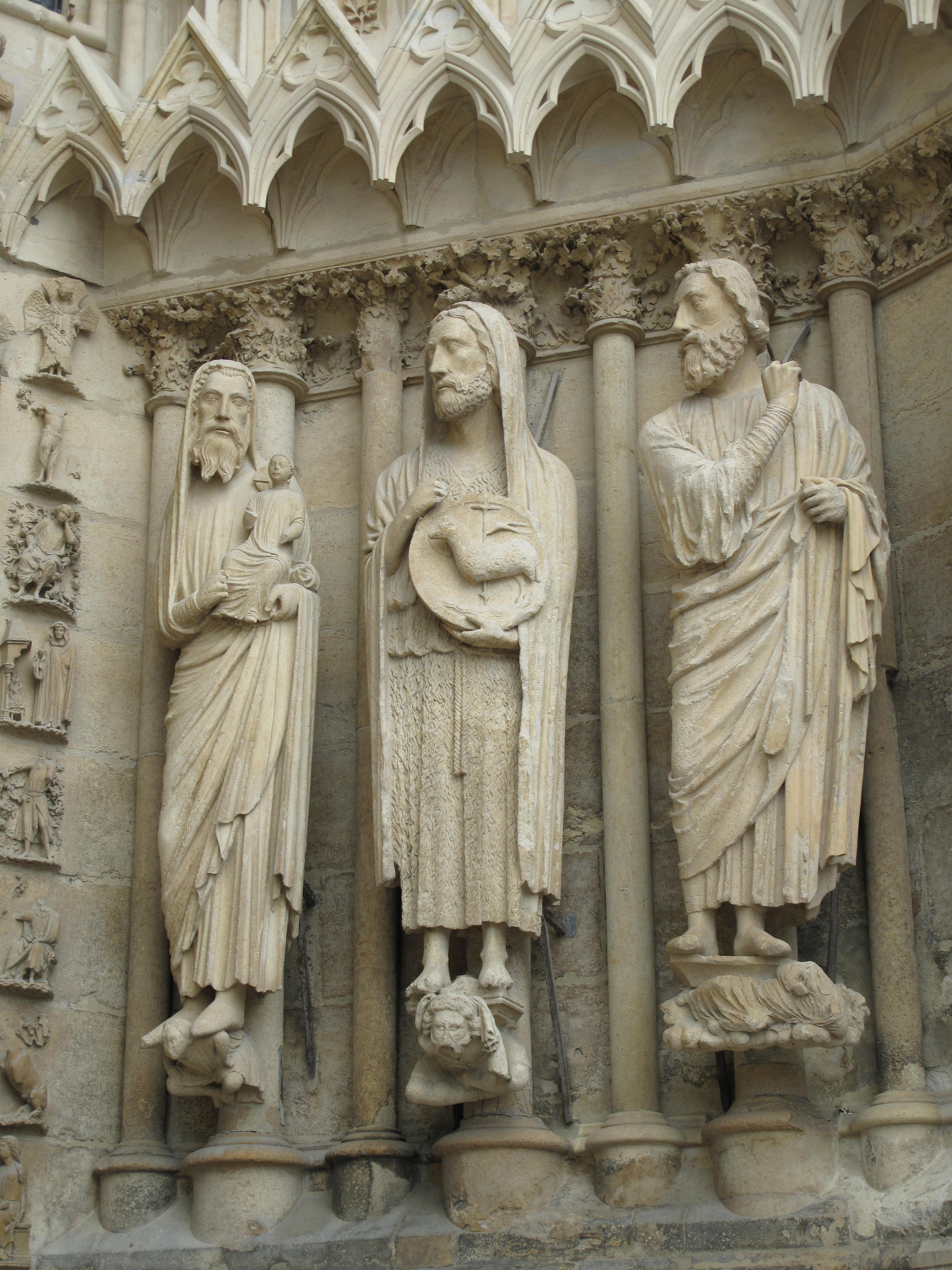
Sculpture of the south portal - Simon, John the Baptist, and Isaiah

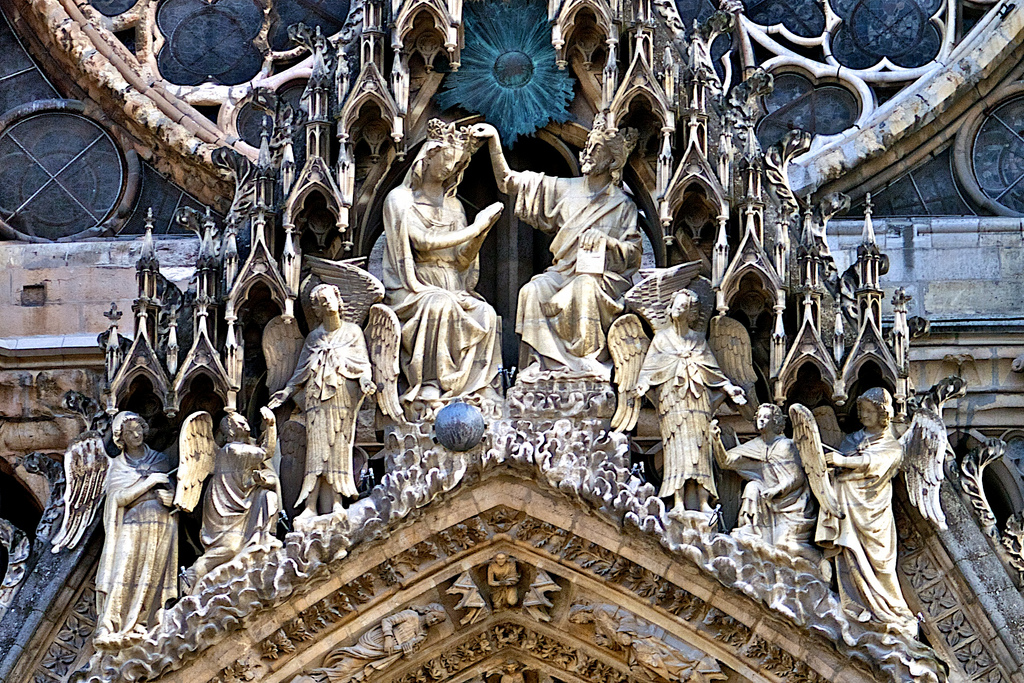
Sculpture over the central portal:
the crowning of the Virgin Mary

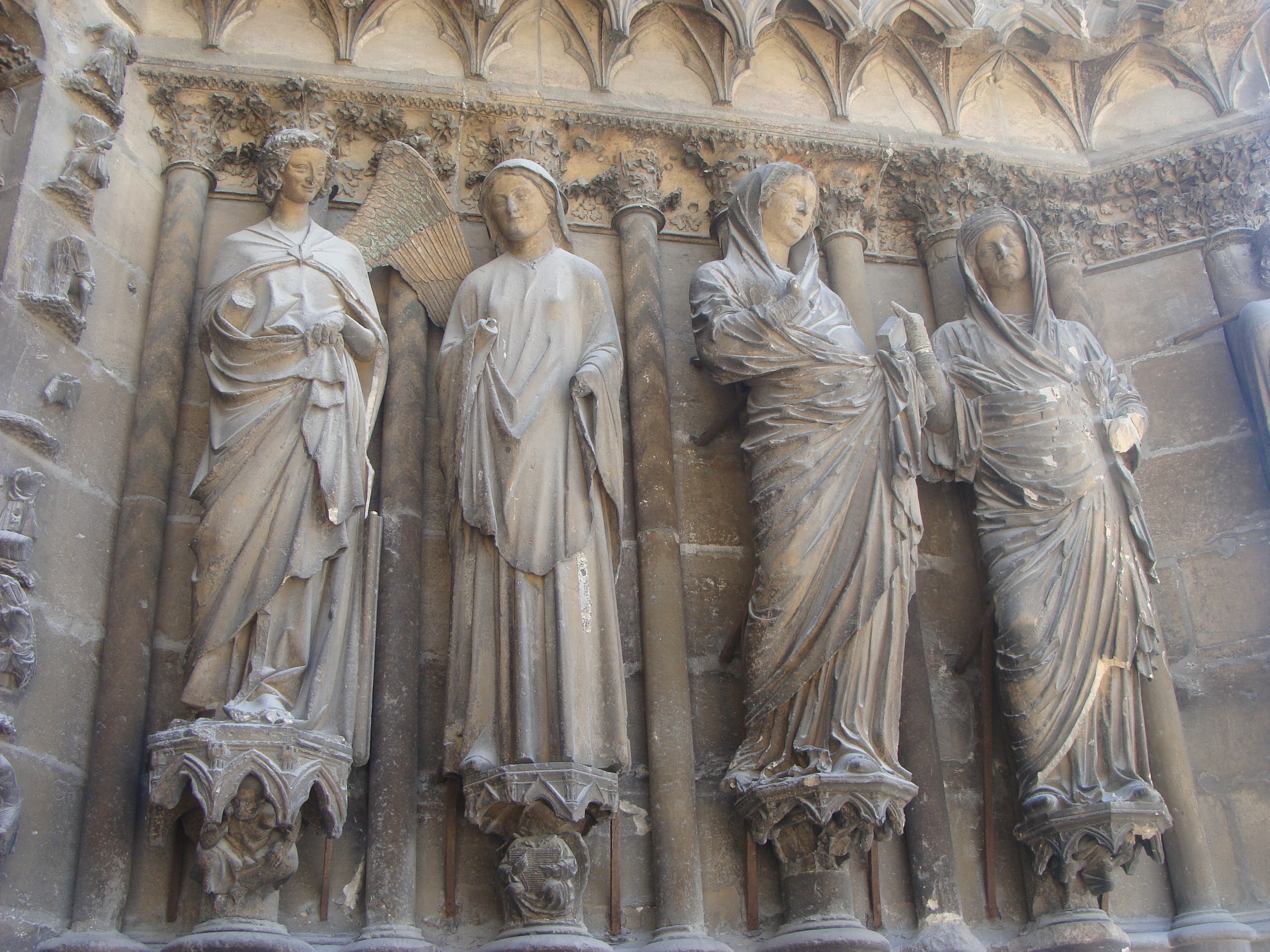
Embrasement of the north portal, including the Smiling Angel next to the Virgin Mary

=== Towers ===
Fire destroyed the original roof and the spires in 1481: of the four towers that flanked the transepts, nothing remains above the height of the roof.

The southwest tower contains the massive bourdon, a bell 2.46 meters in diameter, and weighing ten tons, given to the cathedral in 1570 by the cardinal Charles of Lorraine; it also contains the second bourdon, weighing seven tons, and 2.2 meters in diameter. This bell was made in 1849.

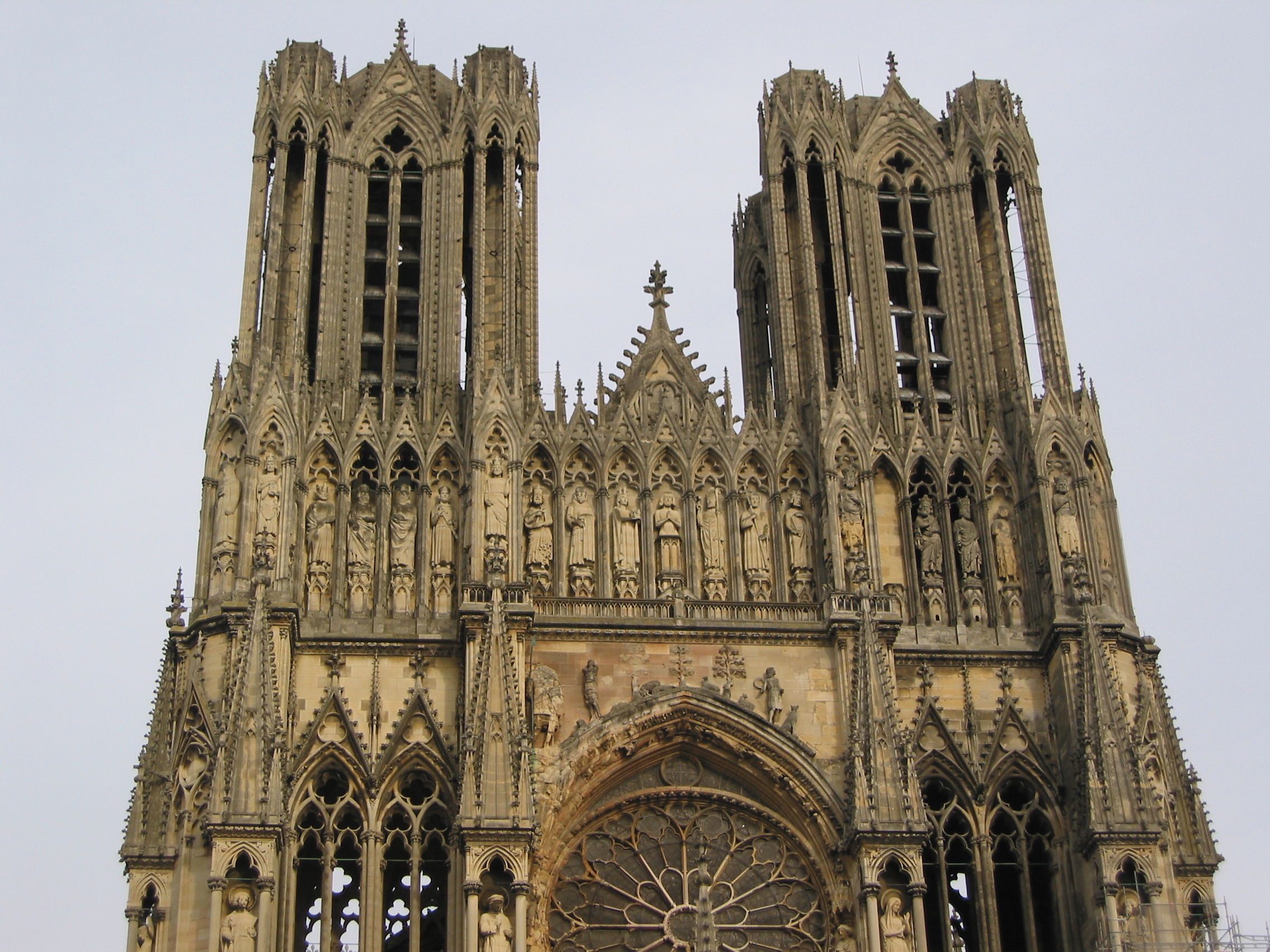
The towers of the west façade

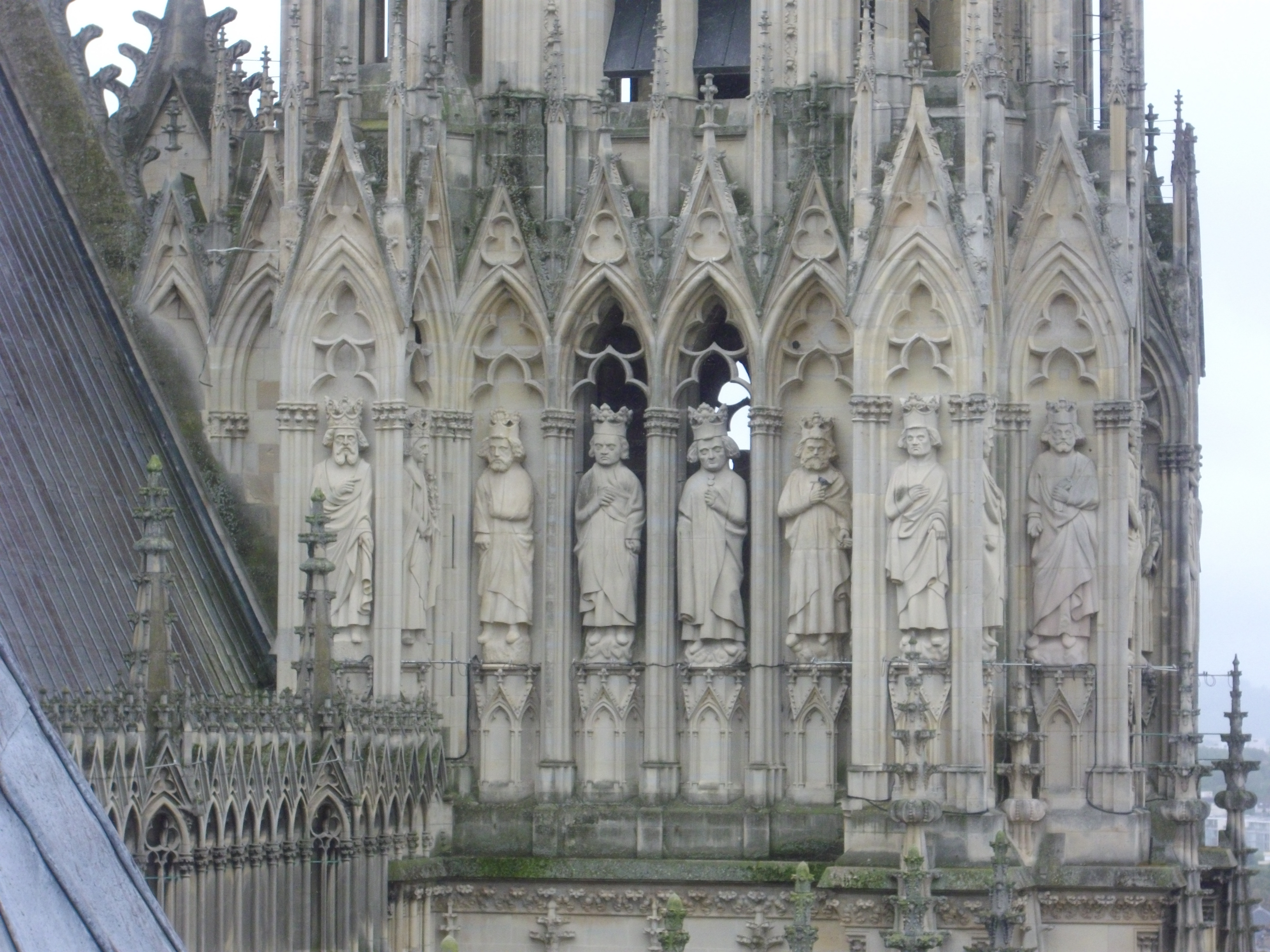
Detail of the north tower

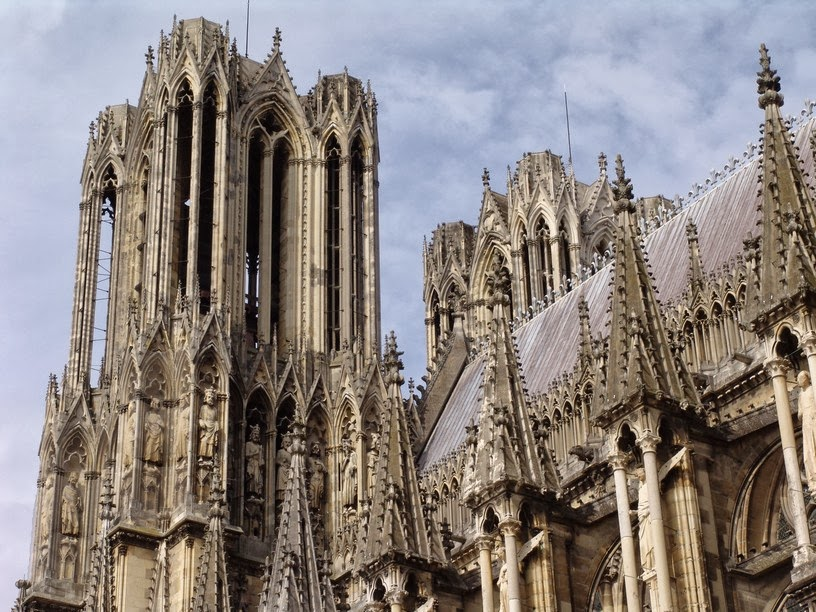
Detail of south tower

=== Transept ===
The north transept, like the west façade, has three portals surrounded by sculpture. They are dedicated to the Virgin Mary (left); Christian saints (centre) and the Last Judgement (right). Above and set back from the portals are three small rose windows, and then a large rose window covered with an arcade full of sculpture. The north rose window is one of the earliest examples of the use of bar tracery, with the panes of stained glass separated by thin stone mullions. Twelve stone mullions radiate outward from a central eye. This became a major characteristic of Rayonnant Gothic architecture.

Above this window an arch full of sculpture, and above the continuation of the gallery of kings from the west façade, with seven statues of apostles and prophets. At the top is a triangular pigeon with a sculptural depiction of the Annunciation. The pignon is decorated with crockets and other elaborate ornament that became characteristic of the late Gothic Flamboyant style.

The north transept is flanked by two tall buttresses, which are crowned by slender tabernacles containing statues of kings, covered with spires decorated with more late Gothic crockets.

The south transept has a similar plan to the north transept, but lacks portals. Instead, there is a group of three narrow lancet windows divided by slender columns and topped by small rose windows, and above them a large rose window. The original south rose window was destroyed by a hurricane in 1580, and was replaced by a window with a simpler design of tracery. The upper gallery of statues underwent major restoration in the 19th century. The triangular pignon at the top is in the Flamboyant style, with sculpture depicting the Assumption of the Virgin. At the peak of the pignon is a statue of a Sagittarius, an ancient Roman archer, with his bow.

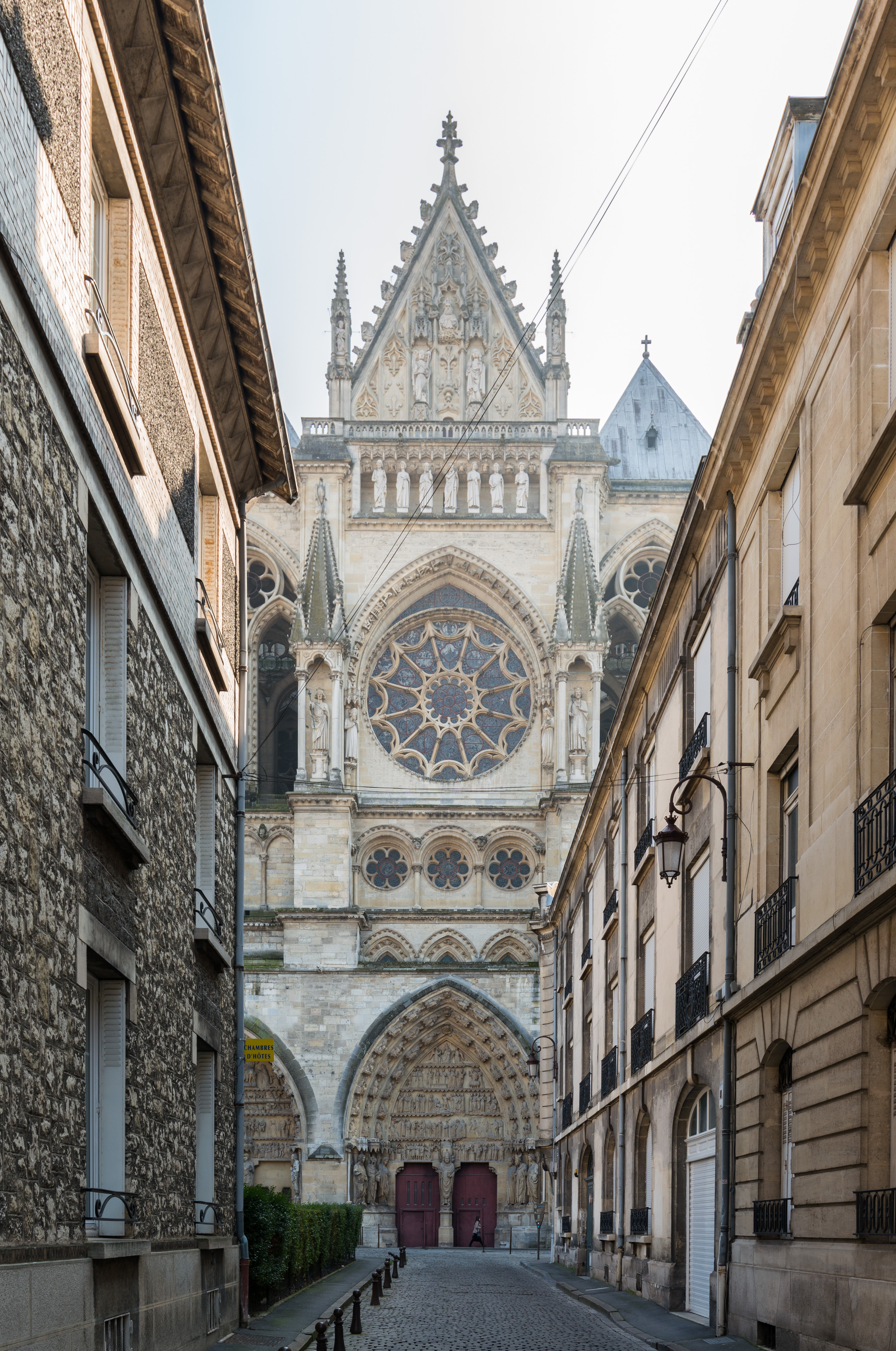
The north transept

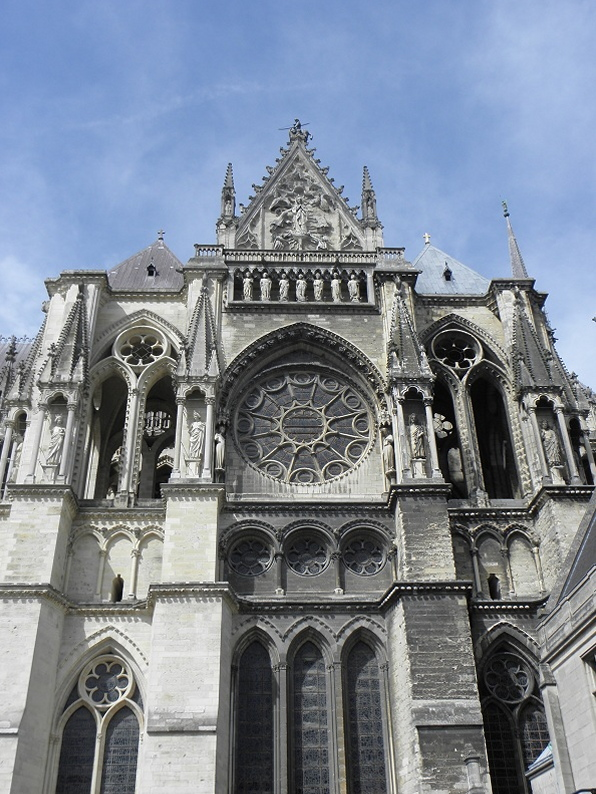
The south transept

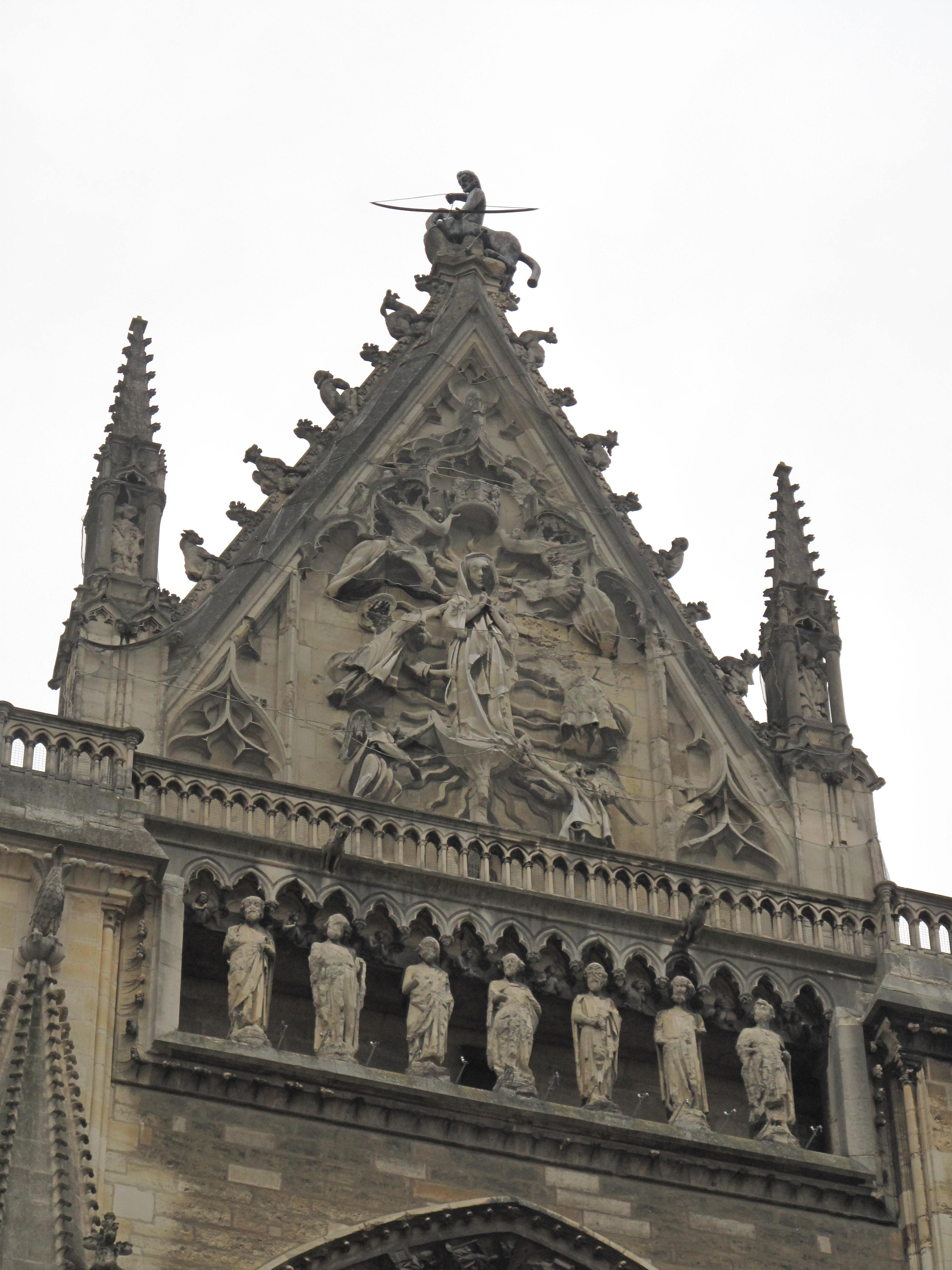
The flamboyant pignon of the south transept, with statue of a Sagittarius on top

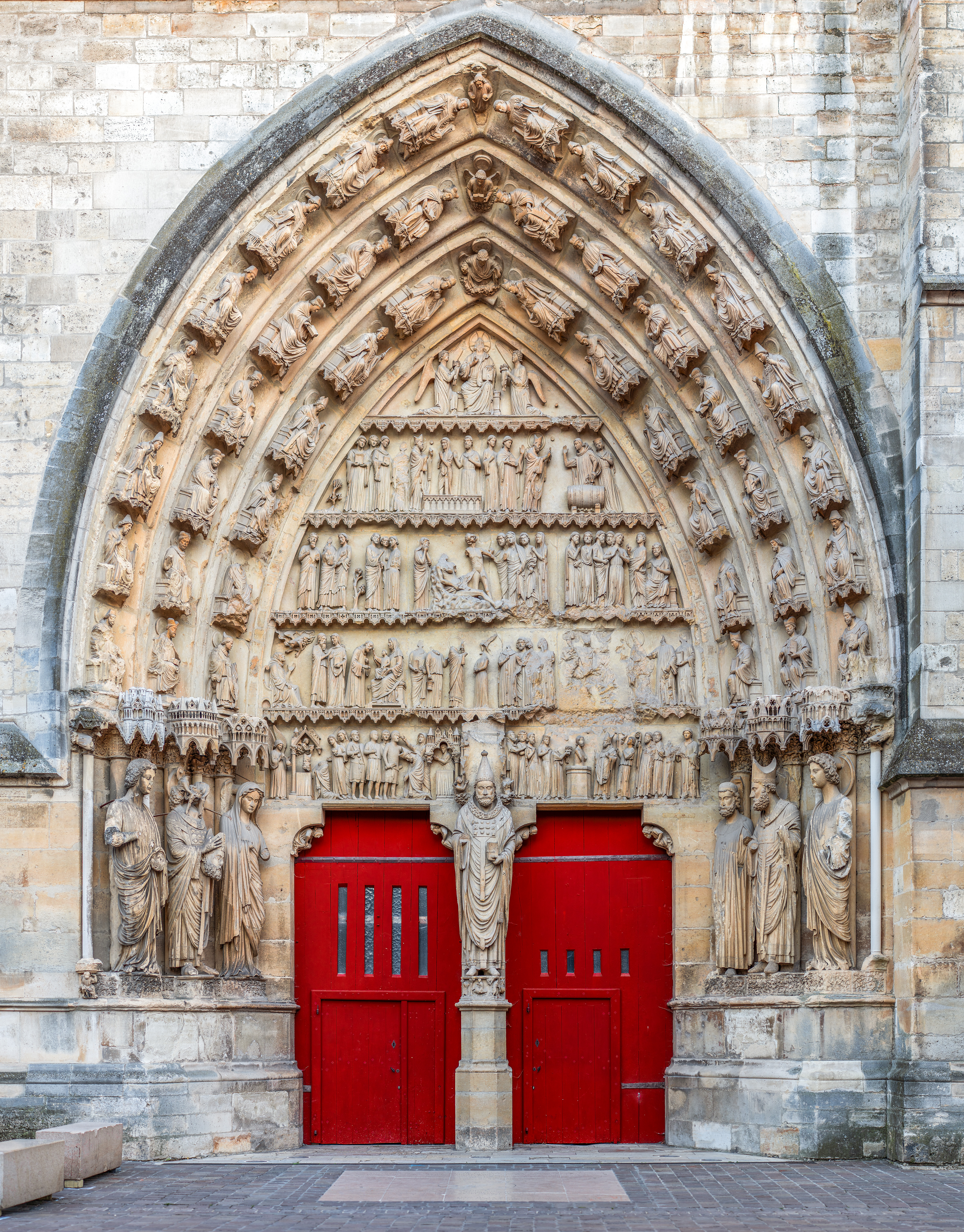
Reims, Notre-Dame Cathedral, north transept crossing. Saint-Calixte Portal (circa 1225–1230)

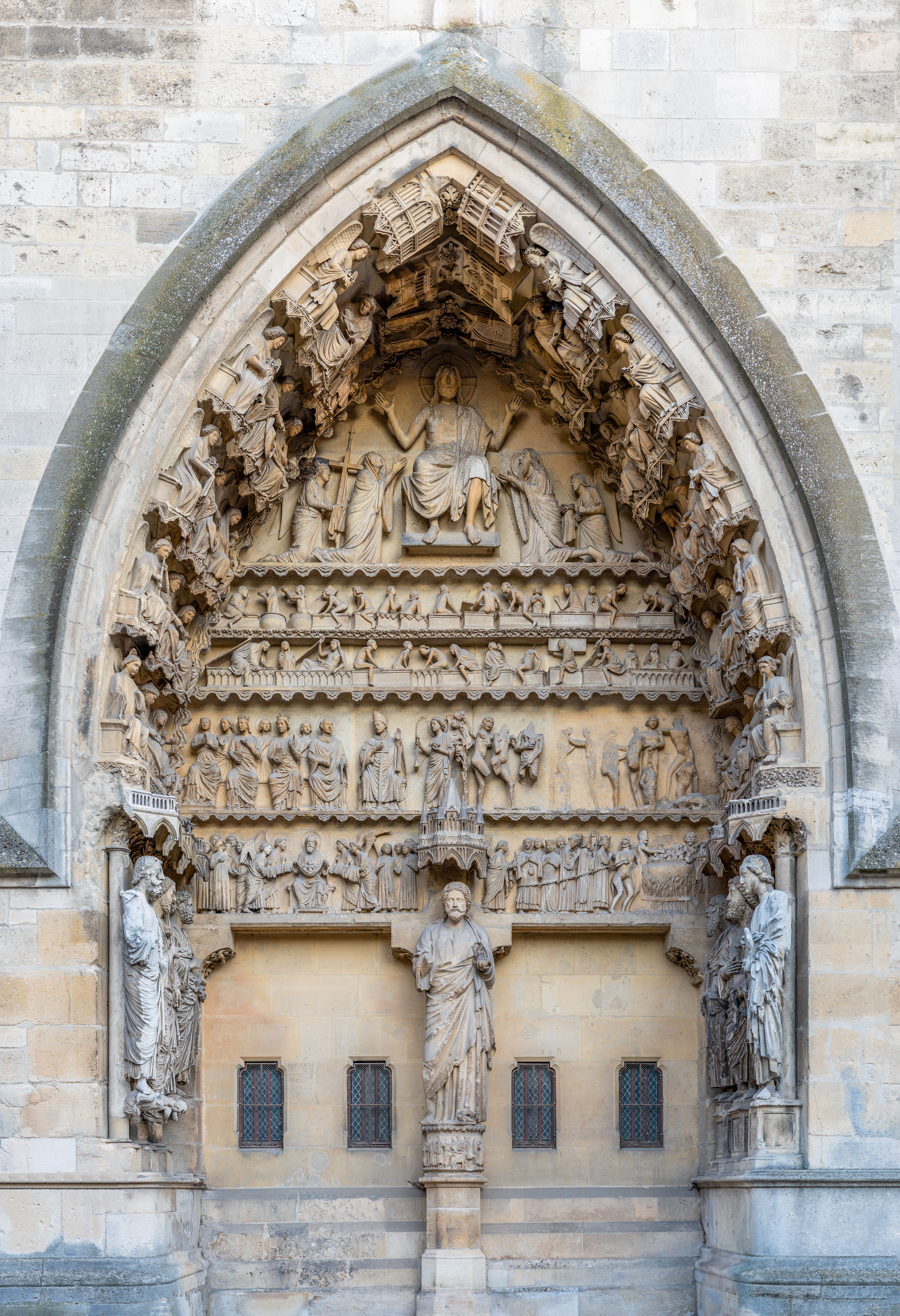
Portal of the Last Judgment. Reims, Notre-Dame Cathedral, north transept (circa 1230)

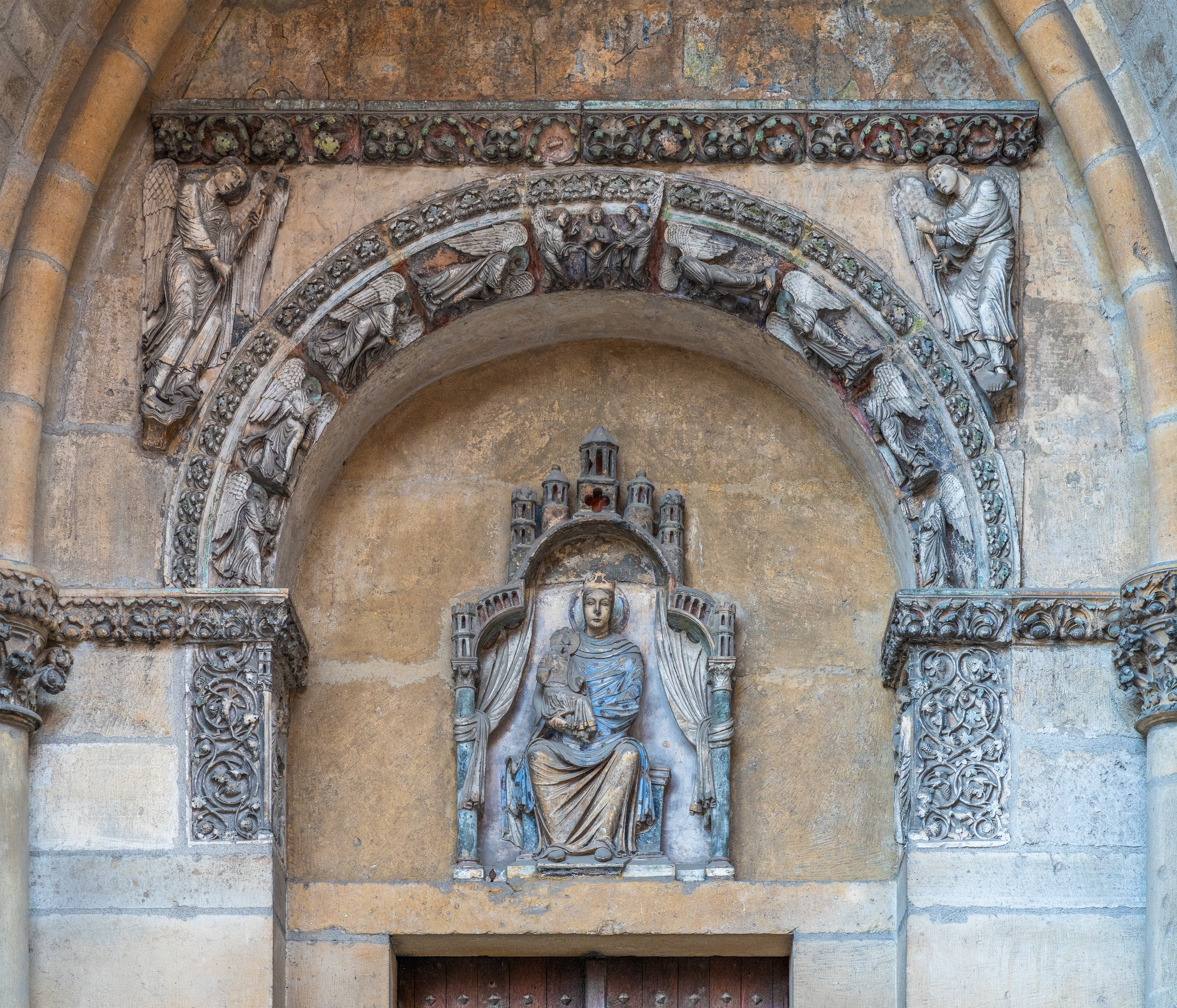
Reims, Notre-Dame Cathedral, portal depicting the Virgin and Child, known as the “Porta Pretiosa,” ca. 1160–1170

=== Walls and buttresses ===
The north and south walls of the long nave are supported by eleven flying buttresses on each side. These counterbalance the outward thrust of the ceiling vaults, and make possible the great height, thin walls and large windows that bring abundant light into the nave. The double arches of each buttress make a leap from heavy pillars to the upper walls. The buttresses are topped by slender booth-like tabernacles containing statues, decorated with slender spires. The statuary gives additional weight to the buttresses, helps conceal the arches, and complements the decoration of the upper level of the cathedral. The buttresses have a secondary function; the arches have narrow channels that carry rain water to the mouths of the sculpted gargoyles which spout it away from the building.

An additional decorative blind gallery was added to the upper walls after a fire of 1481, composed of a series of arches, pinnacles, trilobe rosettes and gables. This conceals the base of the roof, which rises up sixteen meters to its peak. The peak of the roof is decorated with a line of gilded fleur-de-lis ornaments.

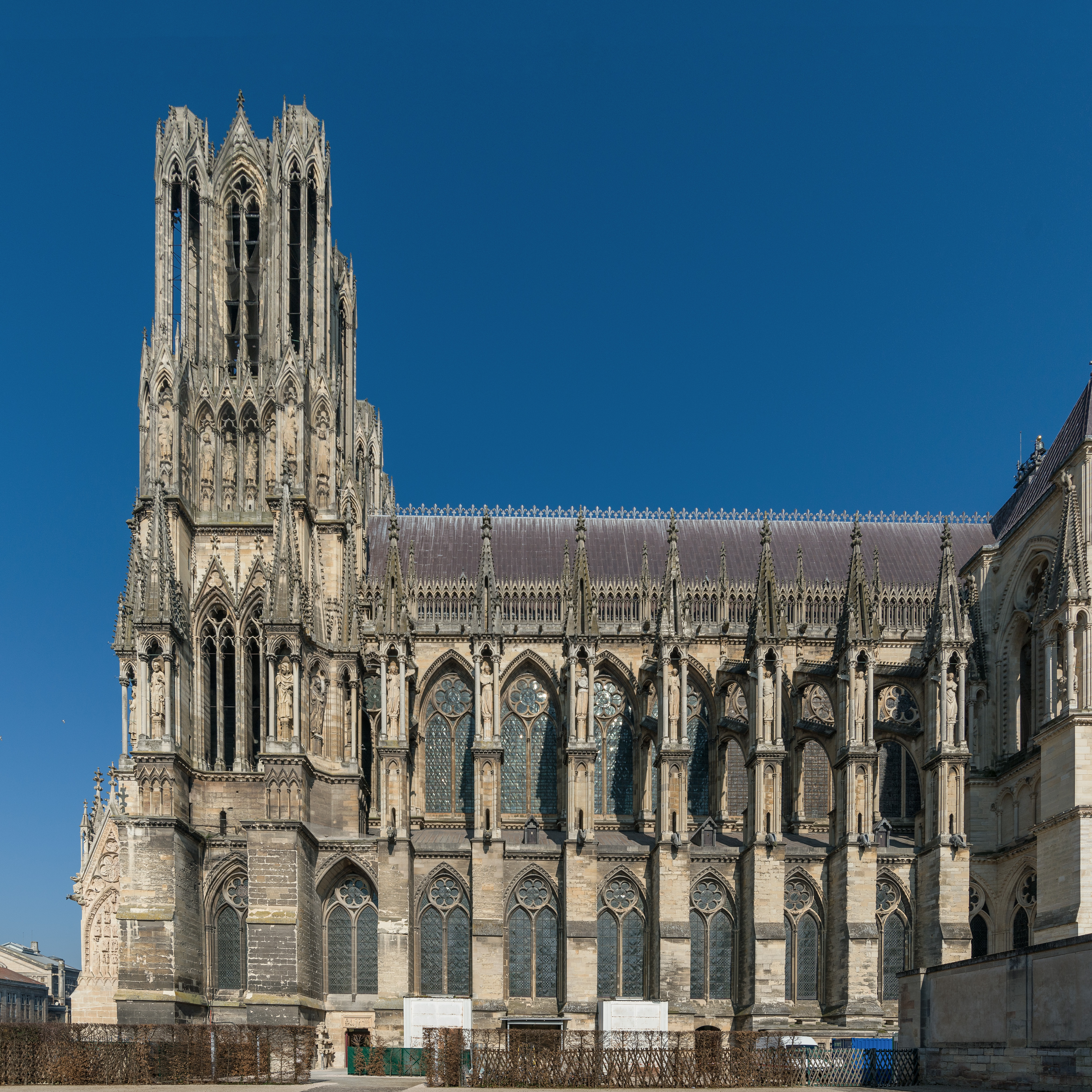
South façade

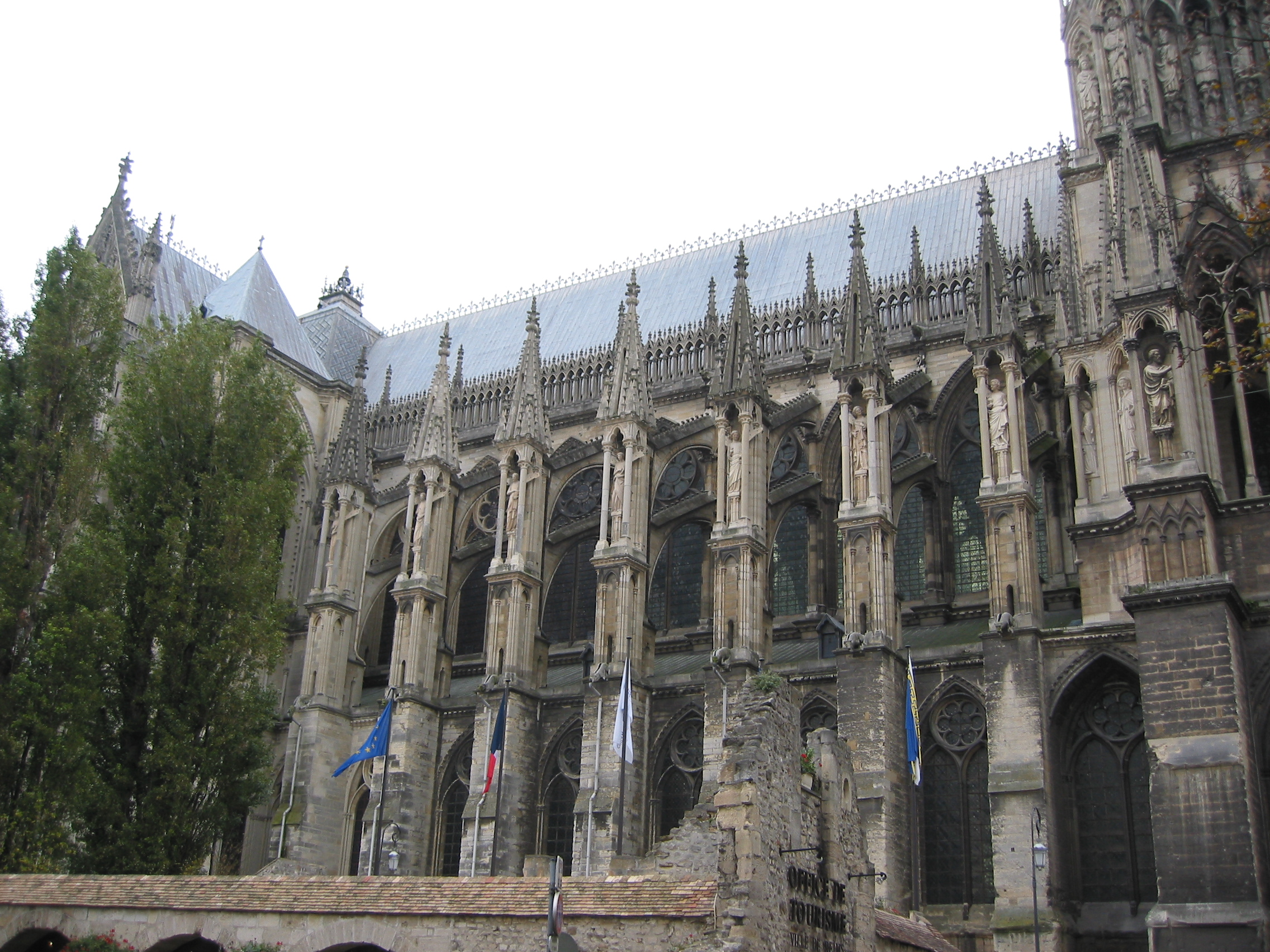
Buttresses on the north side of the nave support the upper walls

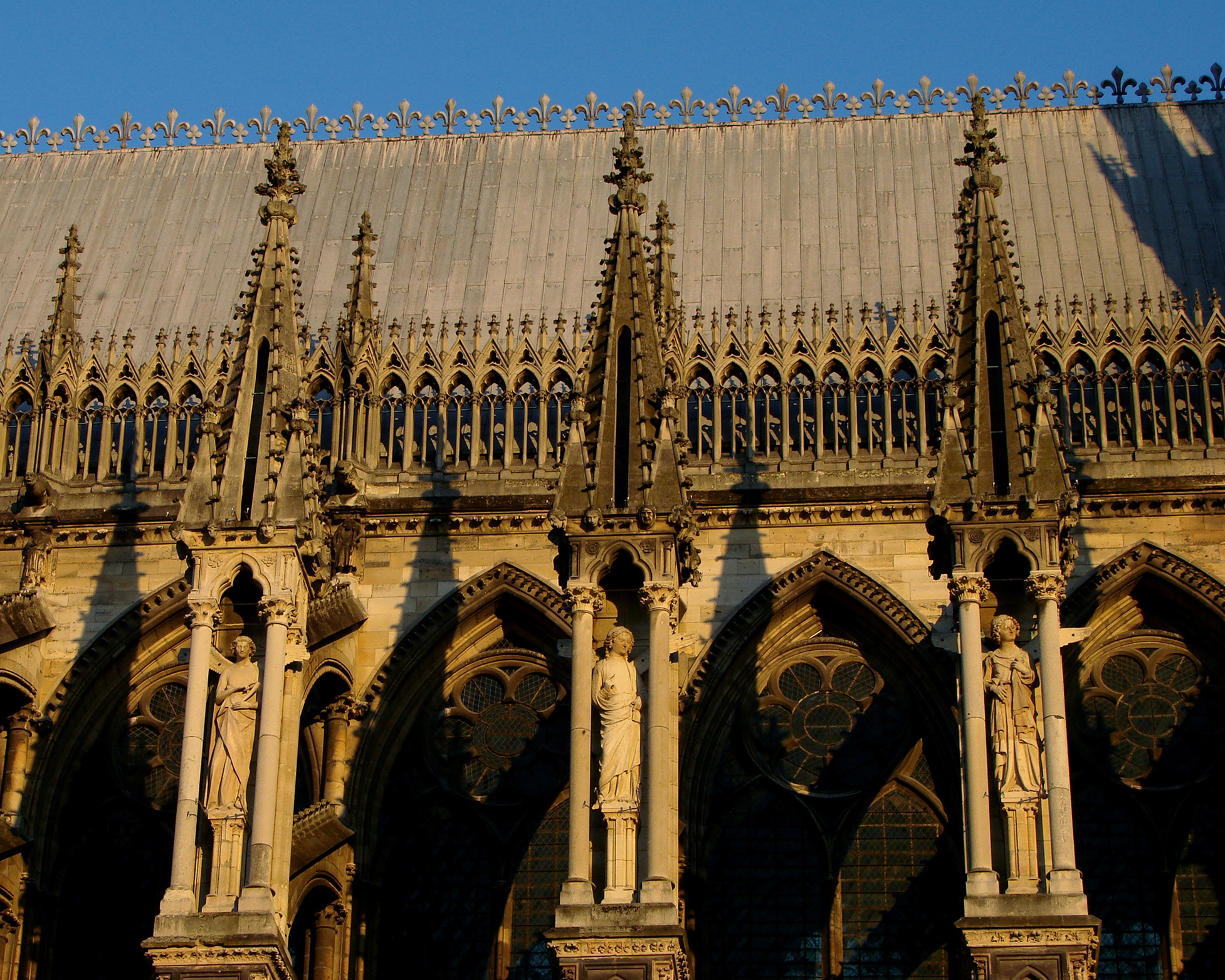
Detail of the north roofline

=== Apse ===
The apse, the east end of the cathedral, has one axial chapel at the end and four radiating chapels. The exterior is lavishly decorated with arcades, pinnacles, spires and an abundance of statuary. Much of the sculpture was added in the 19th century by Viollet-le-Duc.

Above the choir rises a slender, lead-covered timber flèche, or spire, that is 18 m (about 59 feet) tall. It was reconstructed in the 15th century and in the 1920s.

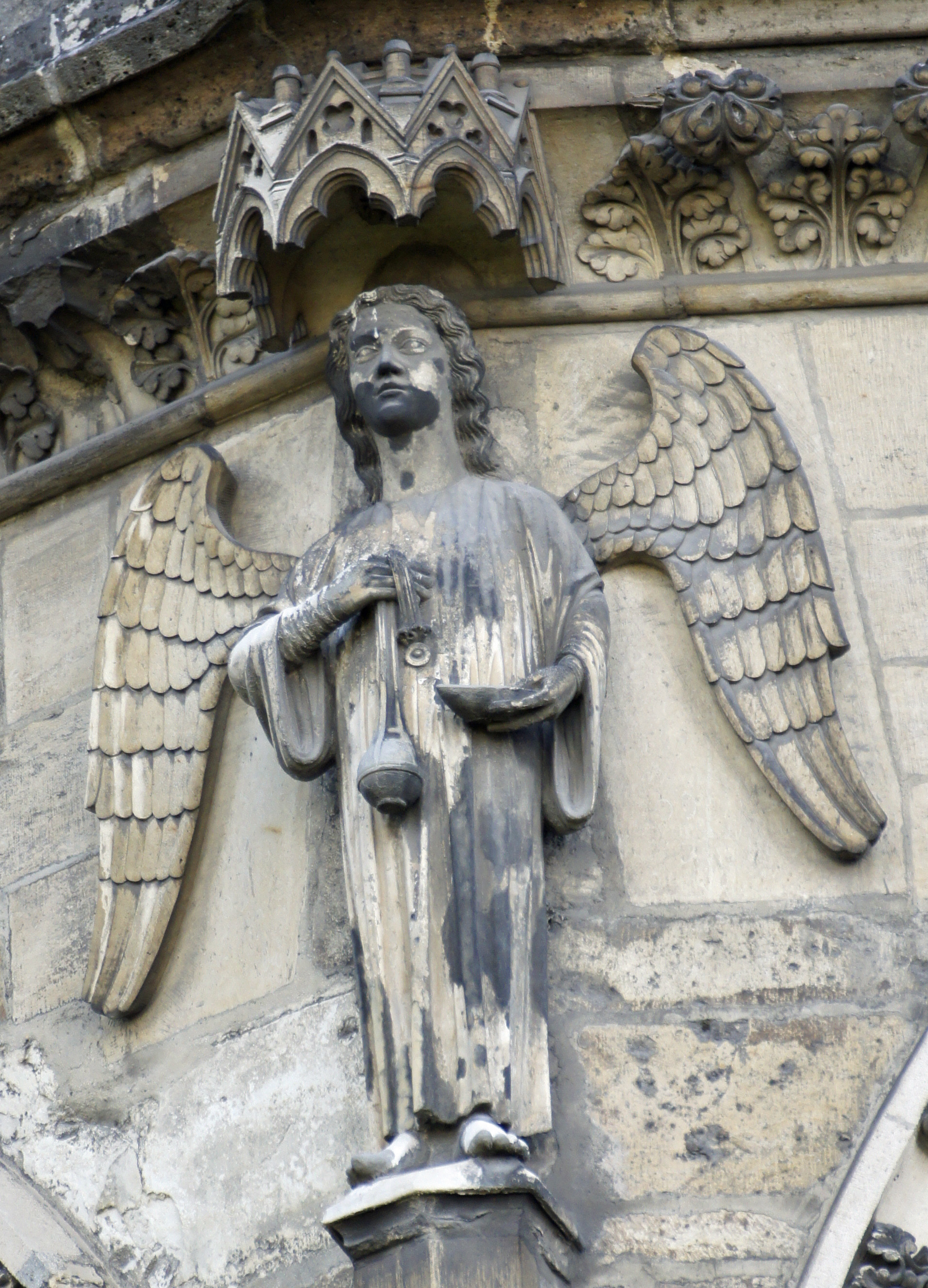
An angel decorating the apse

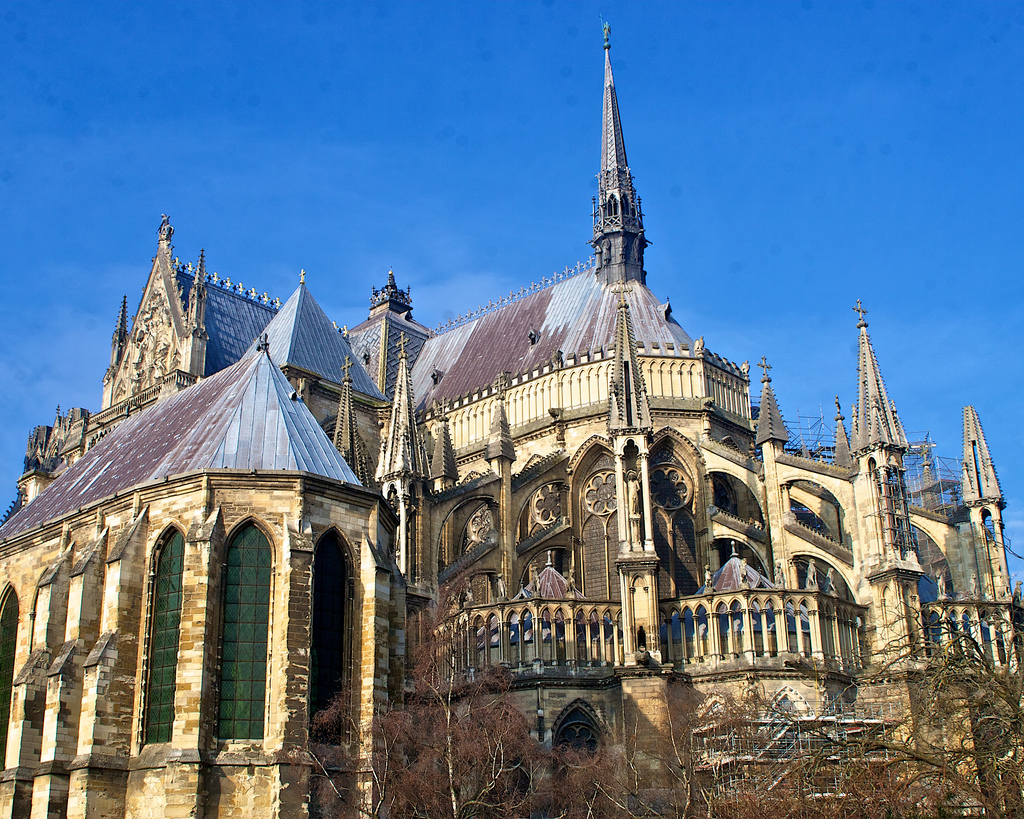
The apse

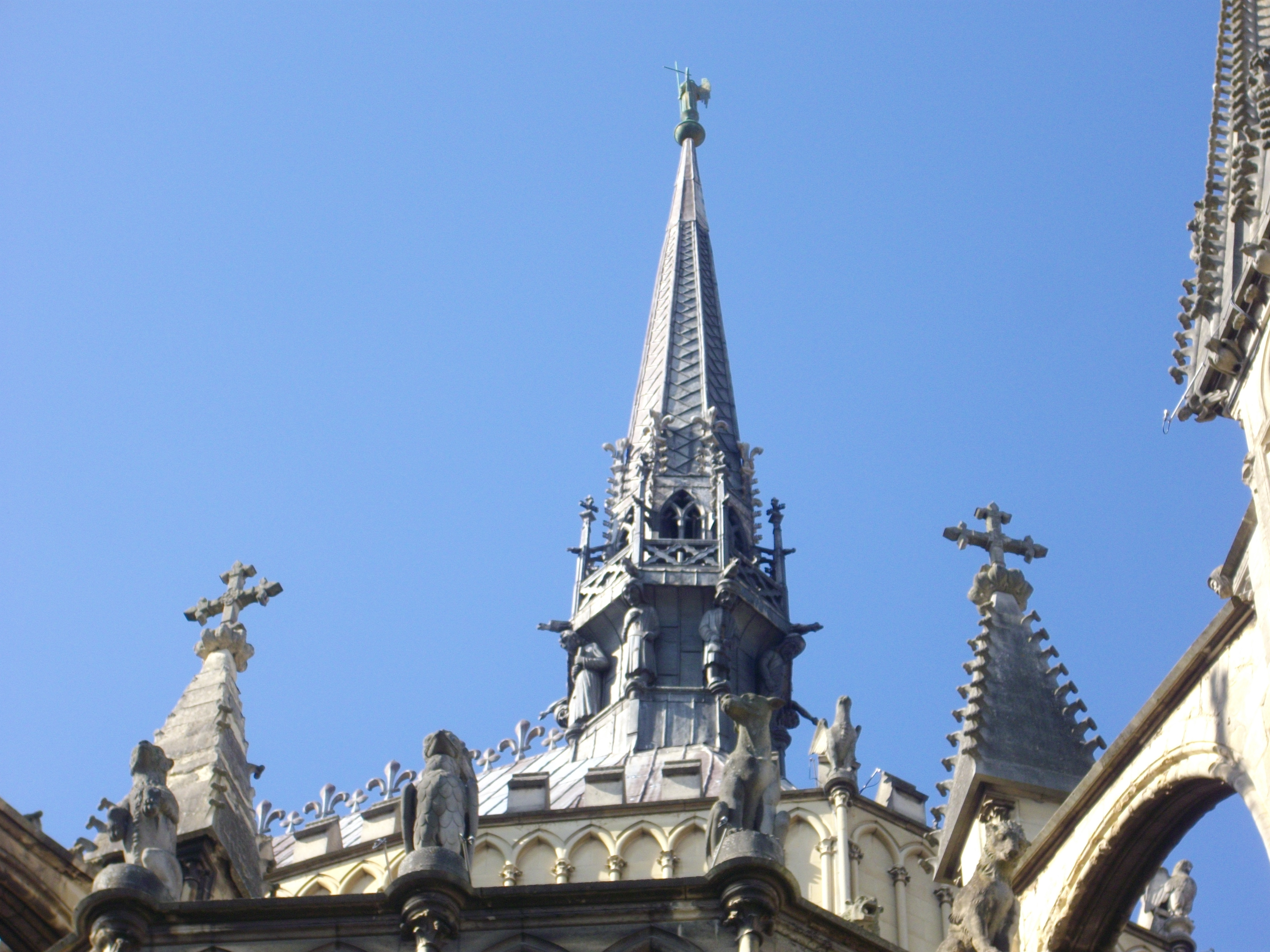
The flèche over the apse

== Interior ==
=== Interior of the west wall ===
One distinctive feature of Reims Cathedral not found in other High Gothic cathedrals is the wall of sculpture on the inside of the west façade. Some of the statues, particularly around the doors, were badly damaged by fire after the bombardment of the church in 1914, but the wall has been substantially restored. Some of the sculpture continues the biblical stories illustrated on the west façade, such as the Apocalypse, while other themes are found only in the interior. Some scenes link Biblical events to more recent historical events; the wall illustrates the baptism of Christ by John the Baptist, parallel with the baptism of Clovis by Saint Remigius. Particularly attention is given to local saints such as Nicasius. One celebrated scene is the communion of the knight; the Old Testament patriarch Abraham, in the medieval armor of a knight, is being offered bread and wine by the priest-king Melchizedek, a preview of the Eucharist in the New Testament.

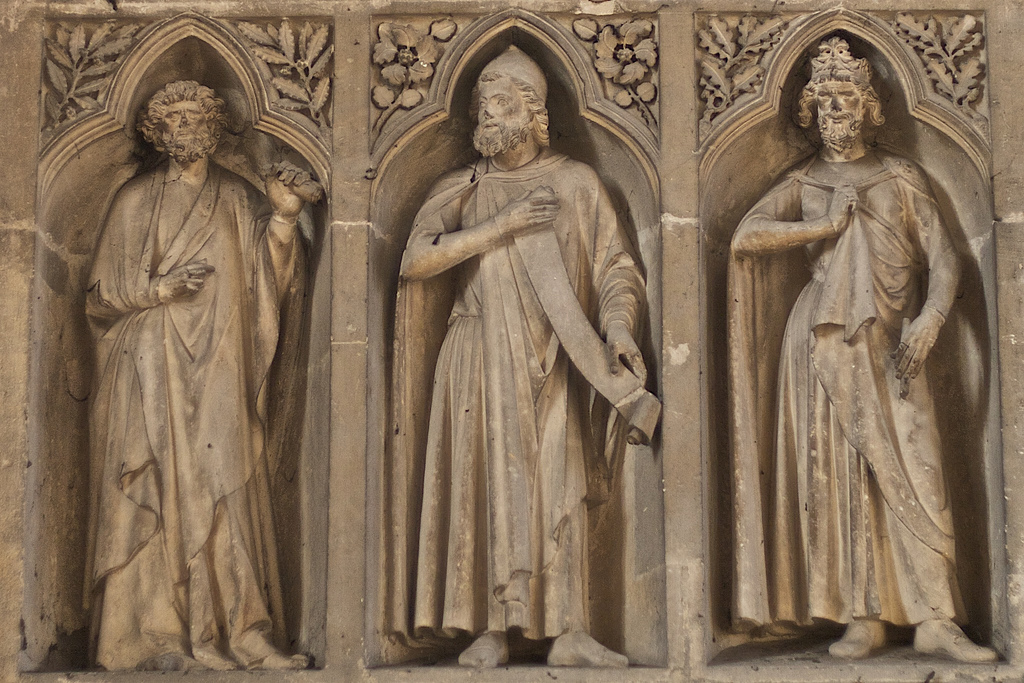
John the Baptist, Isaiah and David, reverse of west façade

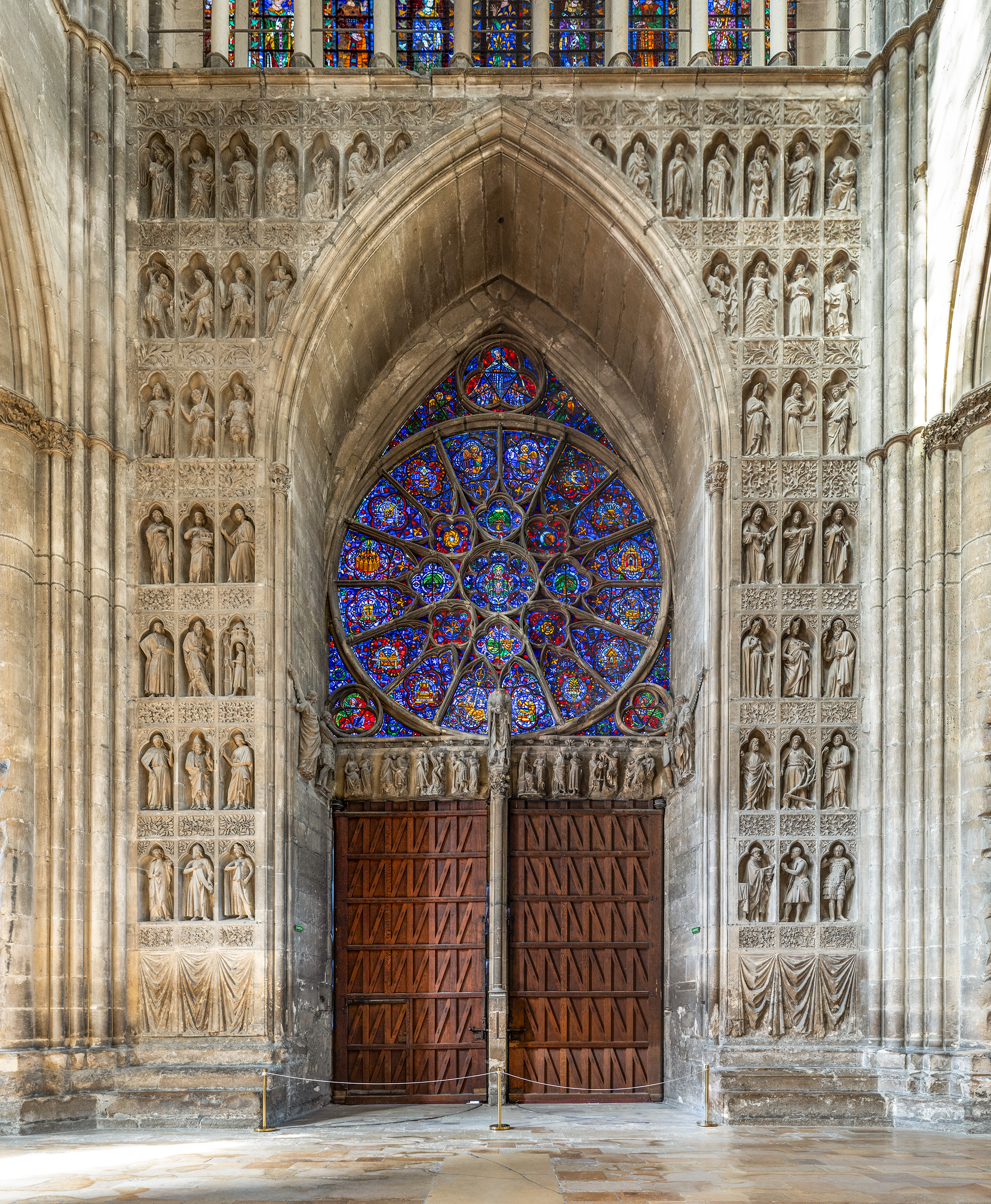
Reims, Notre-Dame Cathedral. Back of the west wall of the main nave. Typological scenes from the Life of the Virgin and Saint John the Baptist, circa 1250–1260

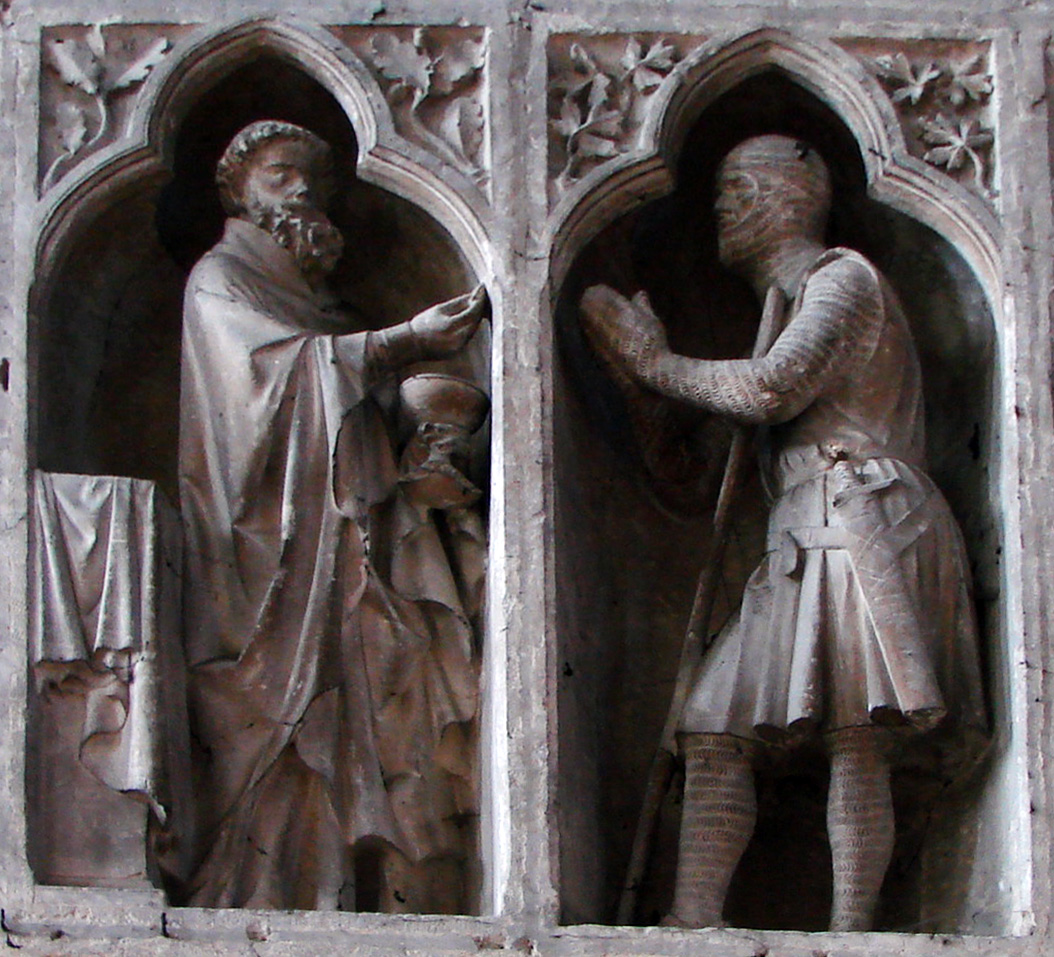
The Communion of the Knight, on the reverse of west façade

=== Nave ===
The nave, the central body of the church running from the west end to the transept, is the section where ordinary parishioners worship. It occupies about half the length of the church, and has exceptional length and unity of style. It is somewhat narrower than the adjoining transept and apse. Its height is made possible through the use of a newer and stronger four-part rib vault, reinforced by the flying buttresses outside. The four-part vaults also made it possible to have arcades of identical pillars, rather than the alternating pillars and piers of earlier Gothic churches such as Sens Cathedral and Notre-Dame de Paris, giving greater unity to the appearance.

The elevation of the church was divided in three sections, following the model introduced slightly earlier in the 1190 Soissons Cathedral: high arcades on the ground floor, above that a narrower gallery called the triforium, and above that tall windows, equal in height to the galleries. Reims combined this unity and simplicity with the enormous size and scale of the nave first introduced at Chartres Cathedral. The architects adapted another element from Chartres; the pillars of the arcade were composed of groups of colonettes clustered together around a pillar, rising dramatically as a group into the high arches of the vaults. The multiple lines of the colonettes greatly emphasised the sensation of height. The capitals of the columns were another distinctive Reims characteristic; they were composed of delicate floral and vegetal sculpture, decorated in places with imaginary creatures.

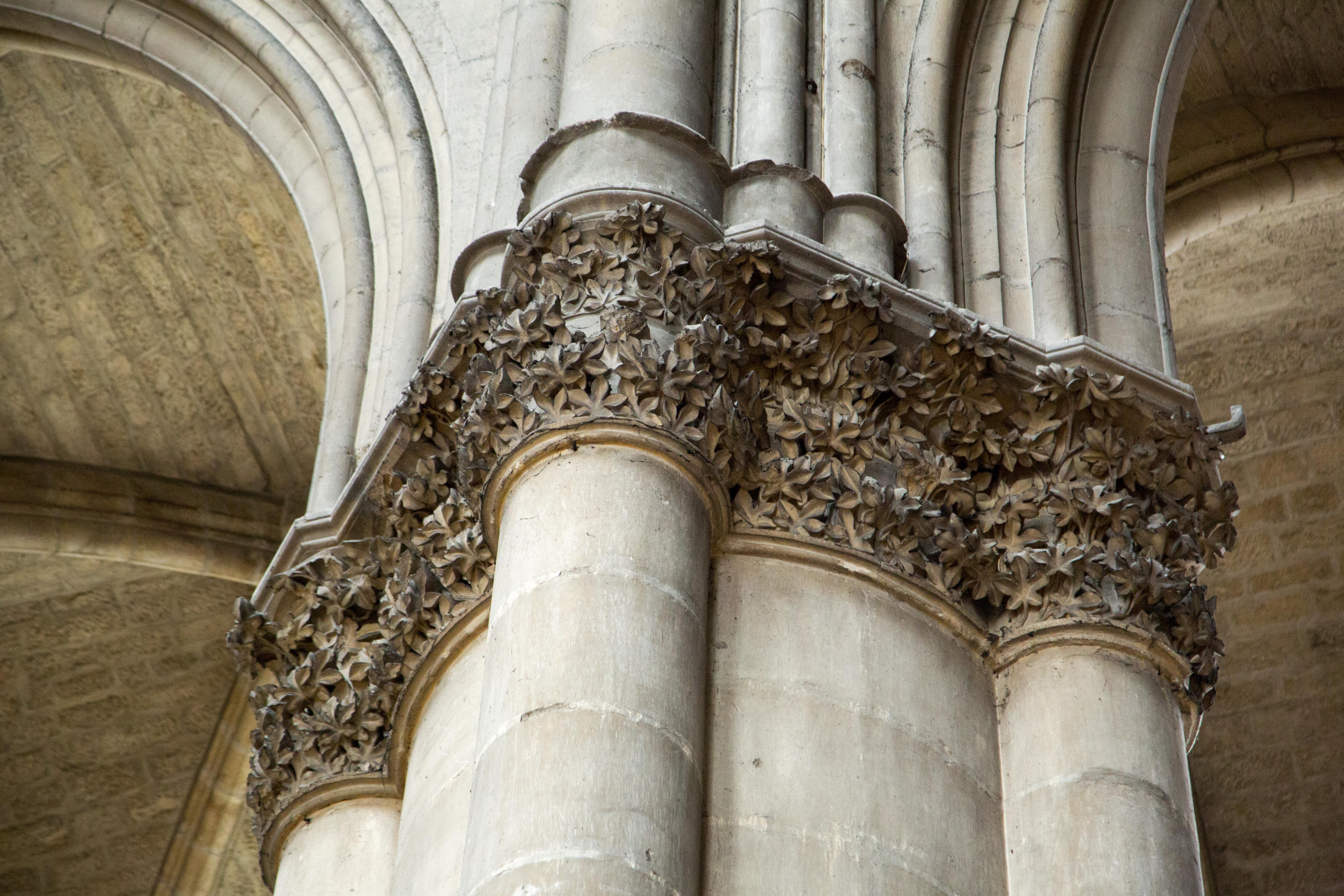
Capitals of the clustered columns, here modelled after the leaves of sycamore (Acer pseudoplatanus).

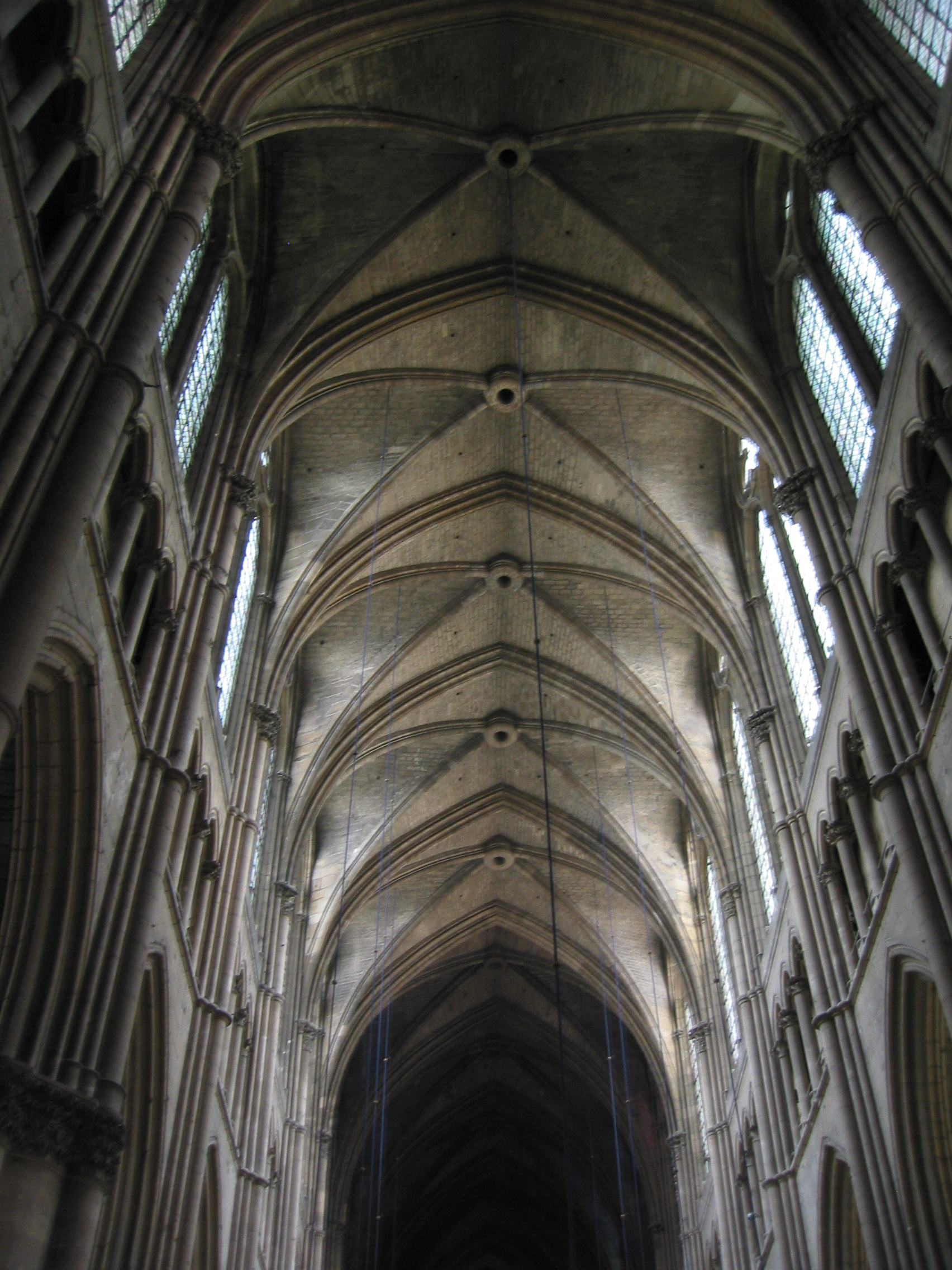
Four-part rib vaults of the nave

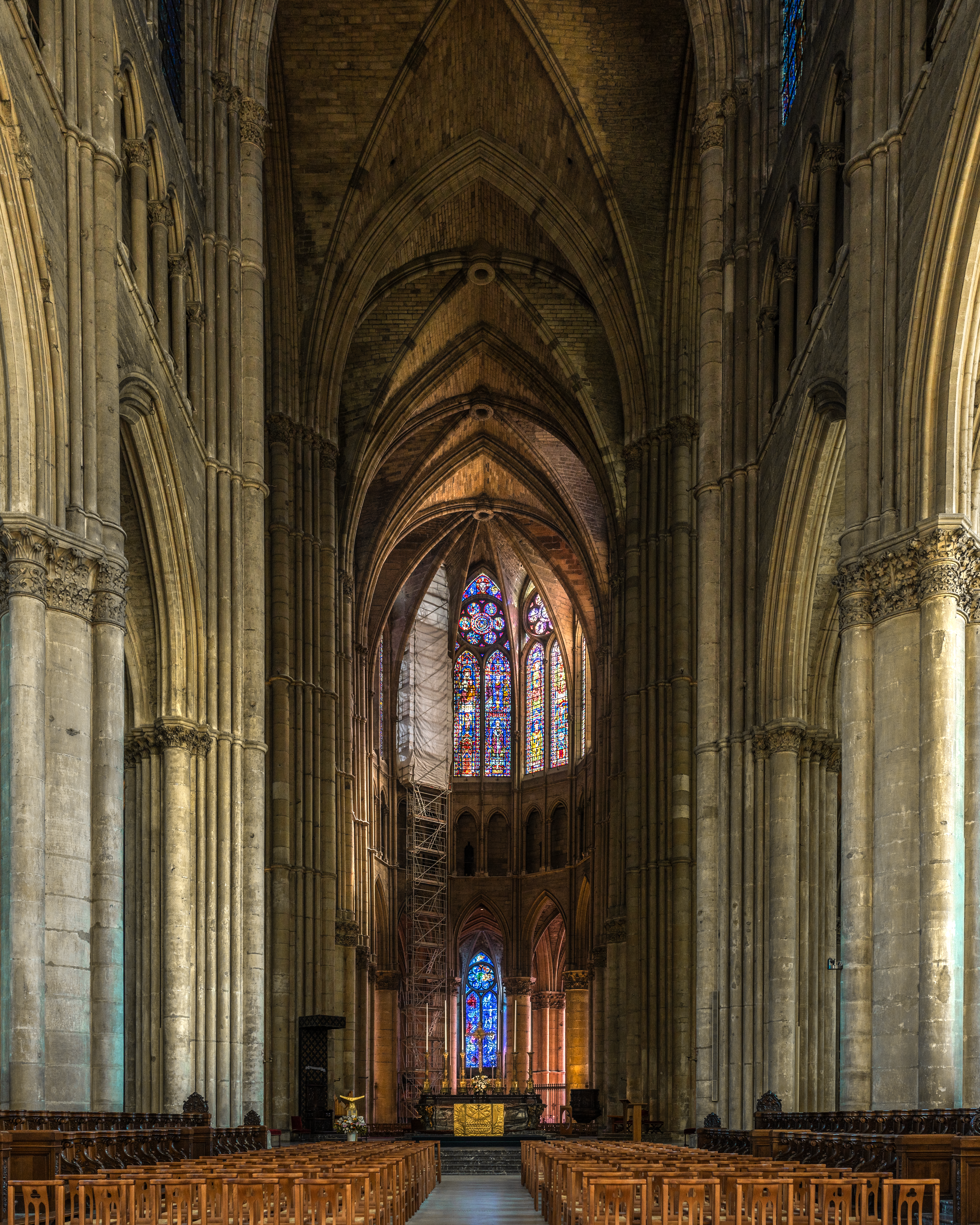
Interior of the cathedral

=== Transept interior ===
The transept is the section of the cathedral between the nave and the choir, which extends on the north and south of the structure. The transept is both wider and higher than the nave, because it was originally intended to have four towers and a higher central tower. The four towers on the ends of the transept were begun but were not completed above the roofline. Four large piers are in place in the transept which were originally intended to support the central tower.

The transept was reserved especially for the coronation ceremony of the French kings. A monumental rood screen, or jubé, separated this portion of the church from the nave in the Middle Ages. The stalls for the ordinary clergy were located in the three sections of the nave just west of the transept, while the area just to the east of the transept was reserved for ceremonies and celebrations of the high clergy.

The organ of the cathedral is locked on the north wall of the transept, just below the rose window.

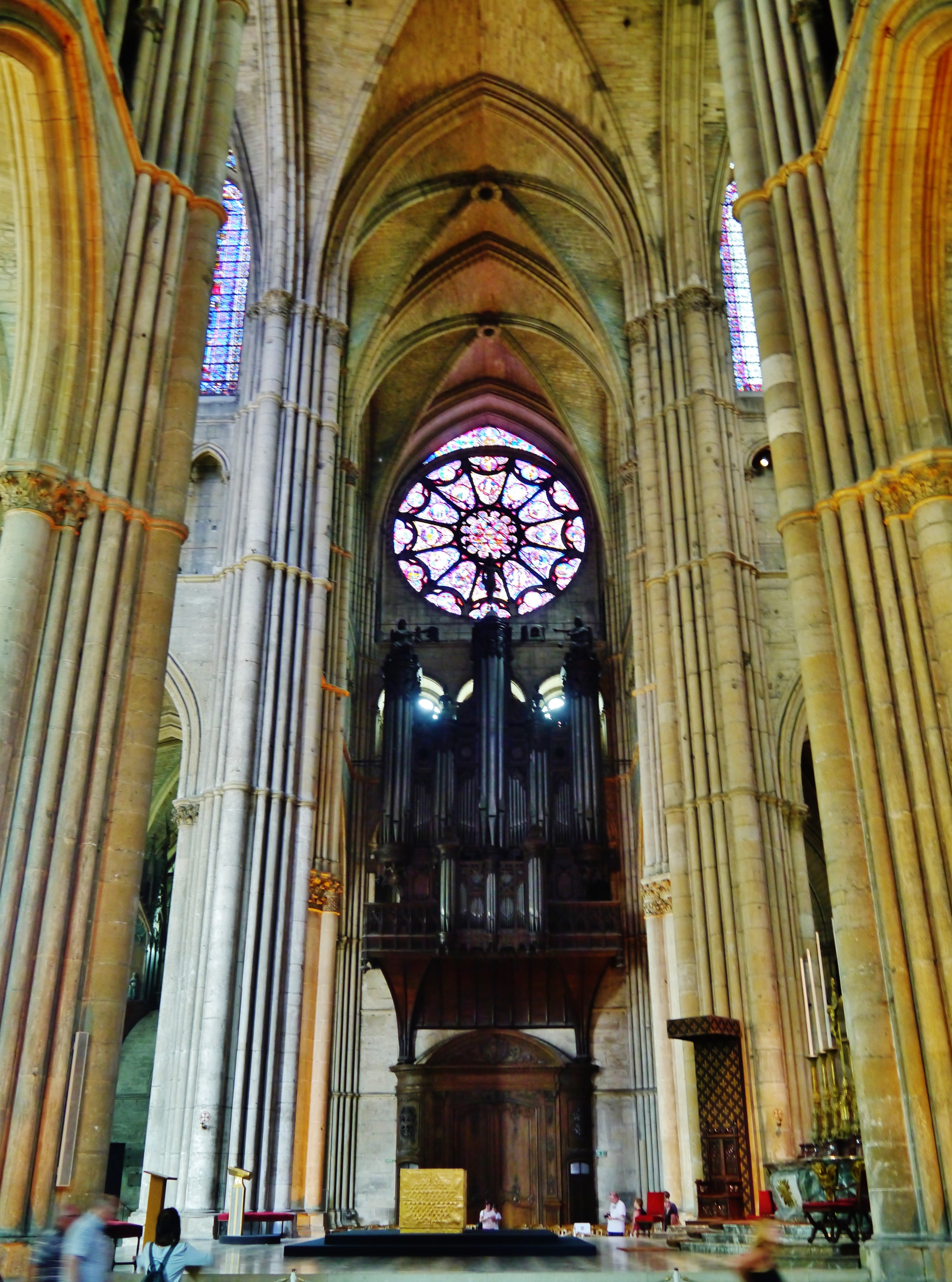
The north transept, with the cathedral organ

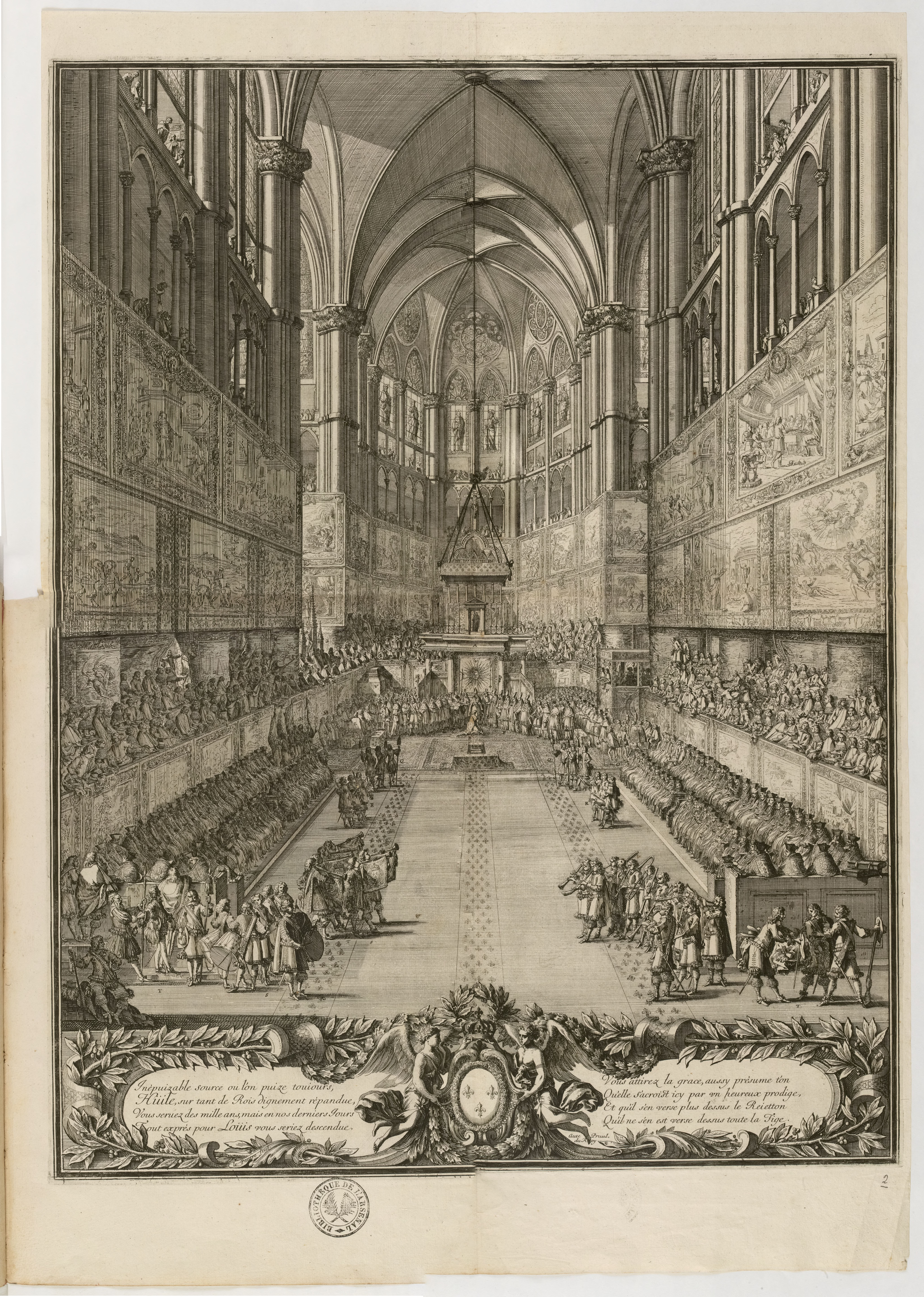
The coronation of Louis XIV in the transept of the cathedral (1654)

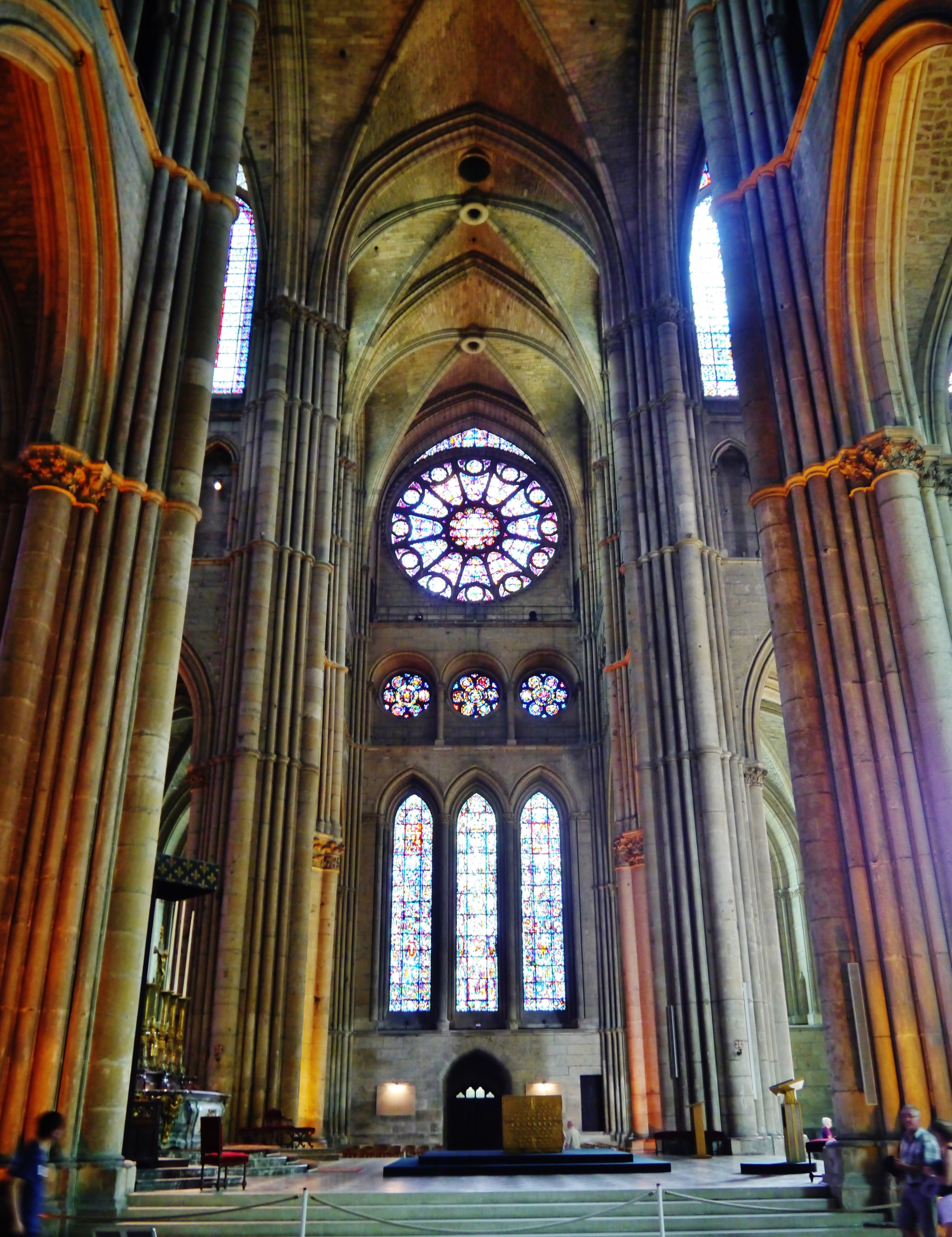
Interior of the south transept, with rose window

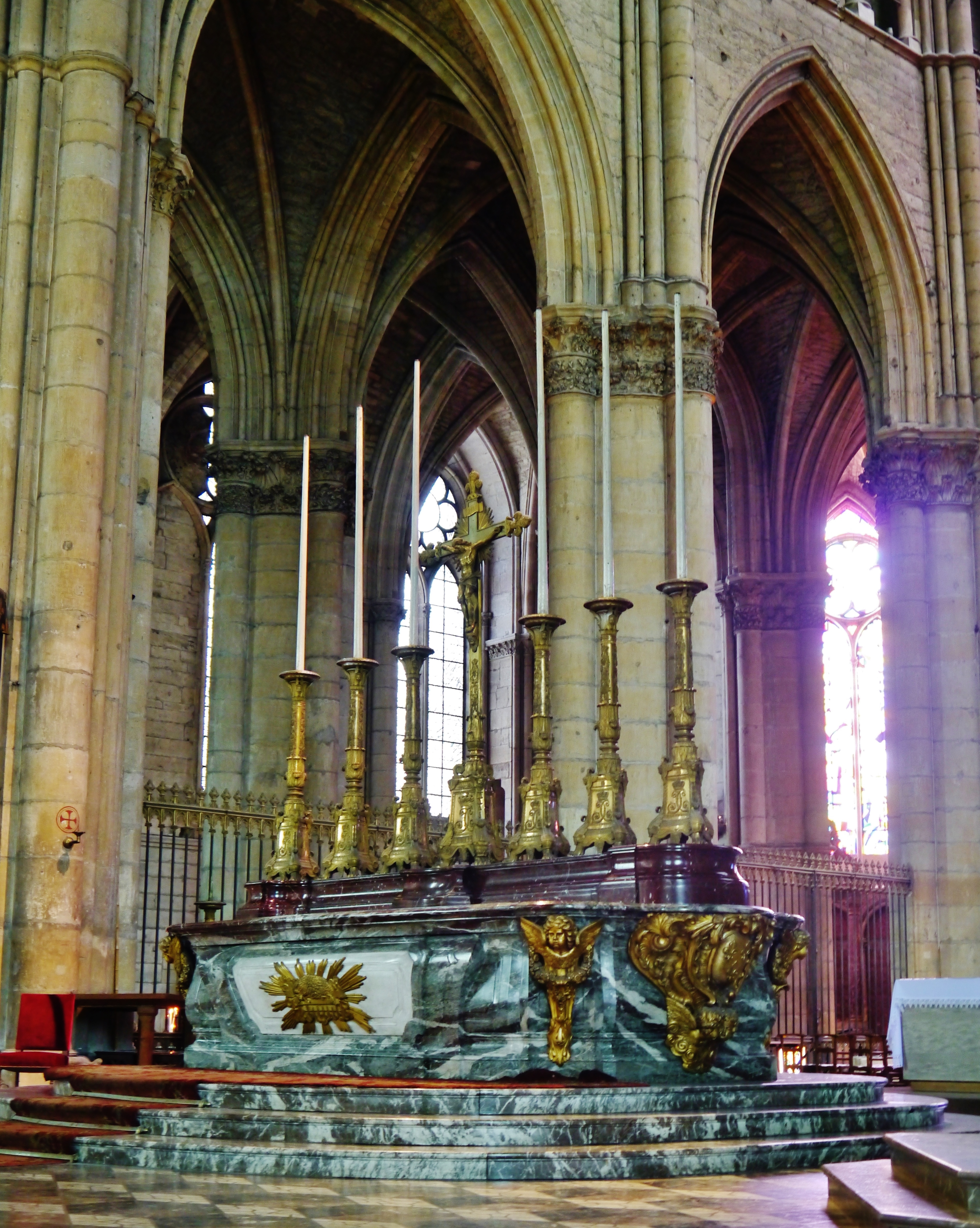
The main altar, in the transept (copy of 1747 altar)

The transept contains the main altar, made of French and Italian griotte, or red marble. It is a copy of the original altar, made in 1747, and destroyed by the bombardment of the First World War.

The Renaissance retable in the rosary chapel of the south transept is another notable work, filled with sculptures of the body of Christ on the knees of the Virgin Mary, and other figures of the apostles, Saint John and Saint Madeleine, and the donor of the retable, the canon Grandraoul. It was created by the Reims sculptor Pierre Jacques in 1541.

On the northwest wall of the north transept in a medieval clock, dating to the 14th century. The clock is in the form of the façade of a church, with elaborate tracery, gables and carved angels. On the hour, a series of figures, representing the seasons, the phases of the moon, and the Biblical Magi appear and disappear from the doors on the face of the clock. It is one of the oldest examples of this kind of mechanical clock.

Another unusual feature of the transept is the floor of the chapel on the south side. This includes a Gallo-Roman mosaic, which was discovered under the floor of the archbishop's palace in 1845 and moved to its present location.

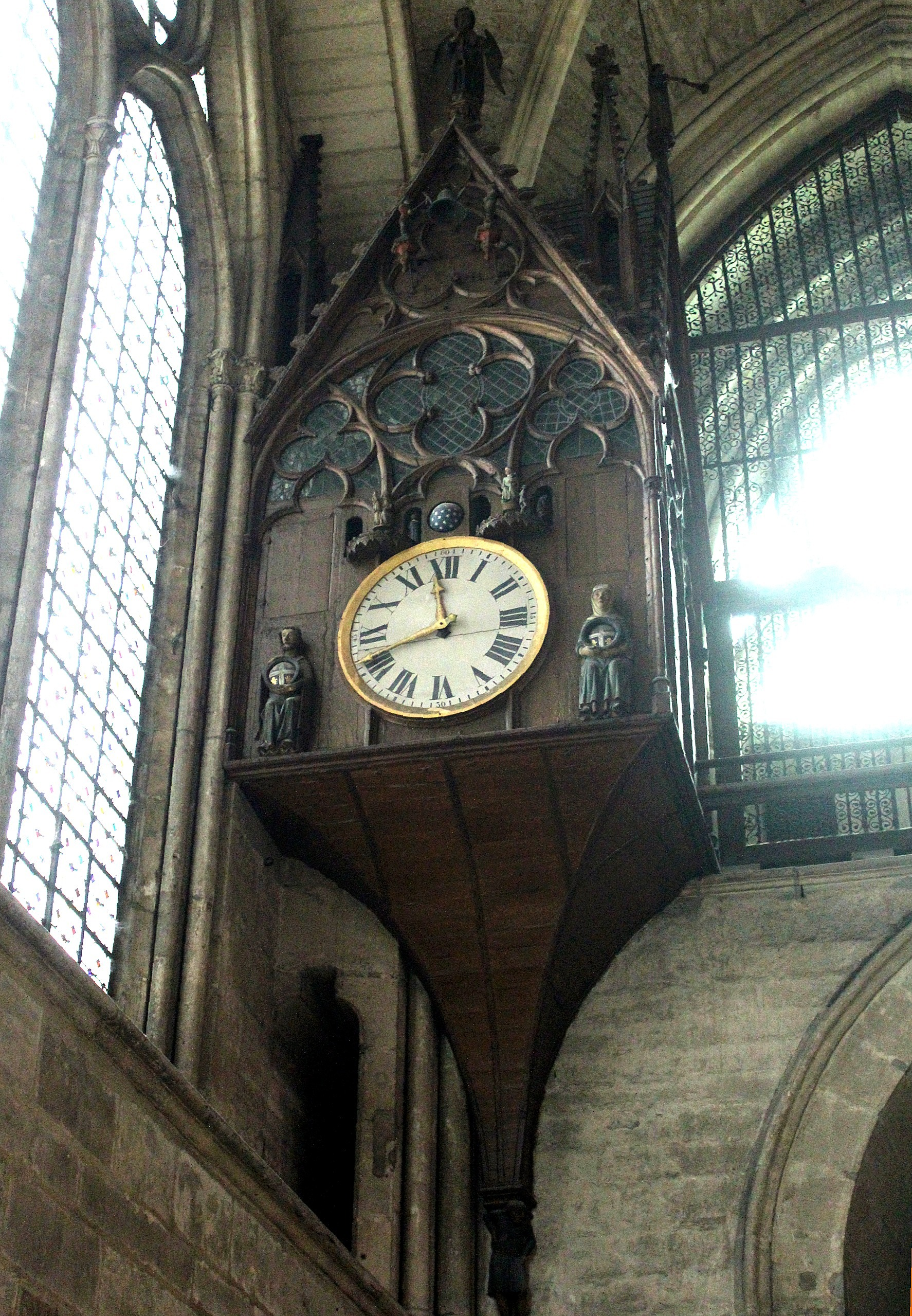
The 14th-century astronomical clock in the north transept

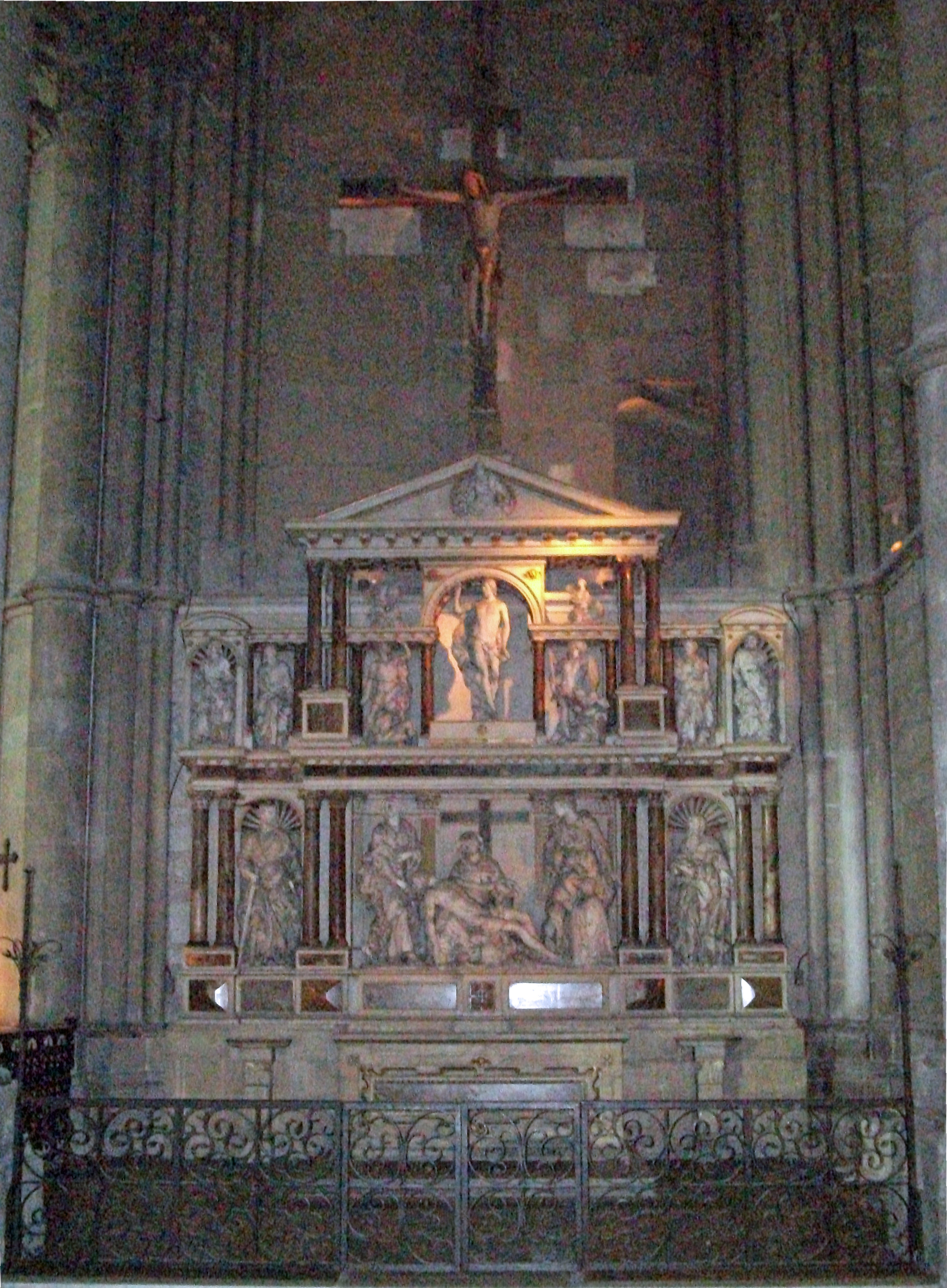
Retable in the Rosary Chapel, south transept (16th c.)

=== Choir and chapels ===
The choir, the area of the cathedral traditionally reserved for the clergy, is much shorter than the nave, but is wider and higher. It features a double ambulatory, or walkway, that gives access to the five radiating chapels at the east end. An ornamental grille separates the ambulatory from the choir and the altar. The pillars around the ambulatory are massive single columns, with richly decorated capitals, mixed with clustered columns, continuing the same program found in the nave. The dramatic arched vaults of the ambulatory spring directly from the columns.

The five chapels at the east end are arranged like a horseshoe, placed between the massive supporting buttresses on the exterior. The chapel on the axis is the longest, and is preceded by an additional ceiling vault. The furnishings and decoration of the apse chapels date from between 1763 and 1777, under the cardinal-archbishop Charles Antoine de La Roche-Aymon. The chapel of the saint Joan of Arc, who had famously attended the coronation of Charles VII in the cathedral, contains her statue, dressed in full armour with a banner. It was made in 1901 by the sculptor Prosper d'Épinay.

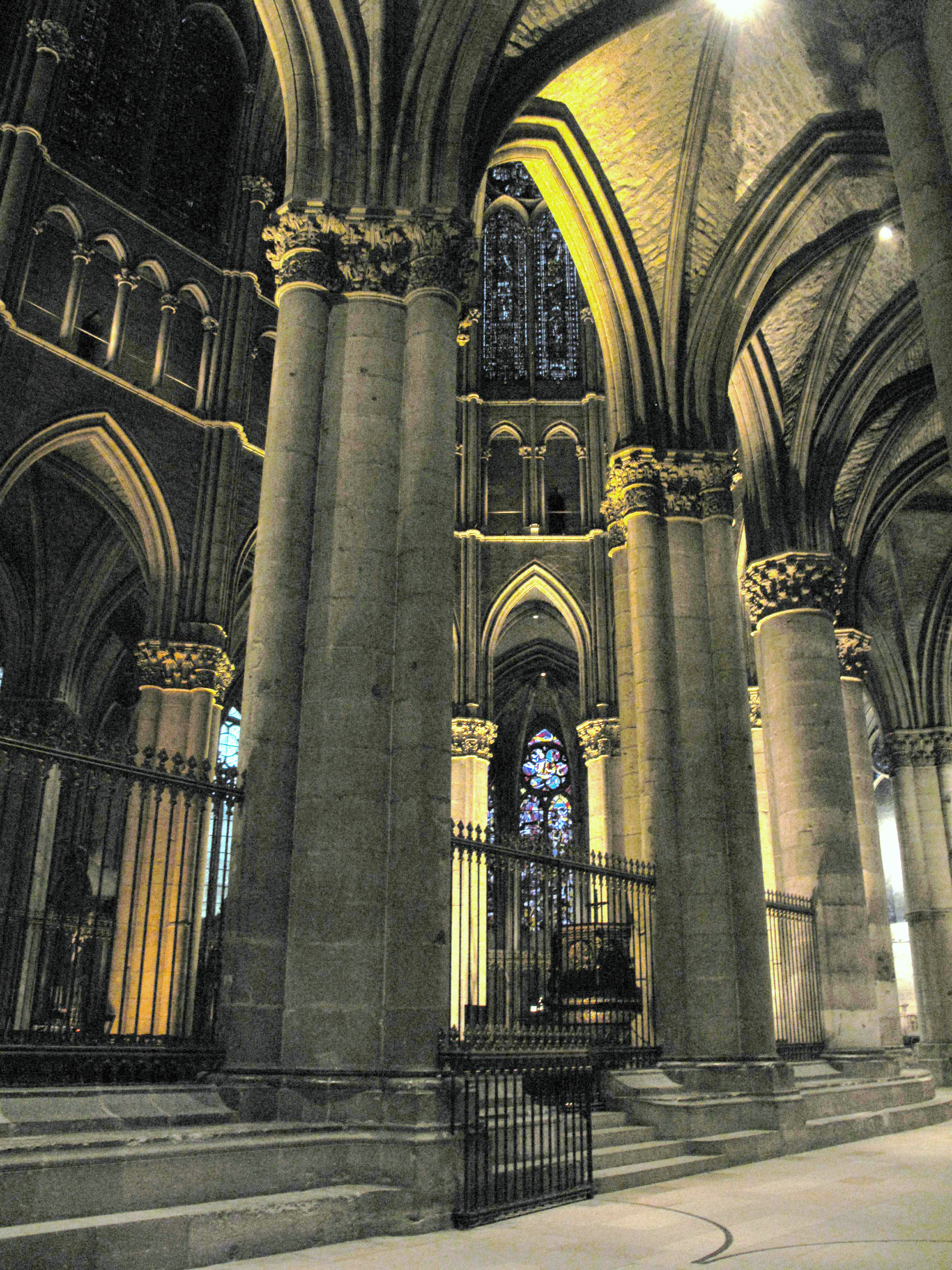
The gallery of the choir and radiating chapels

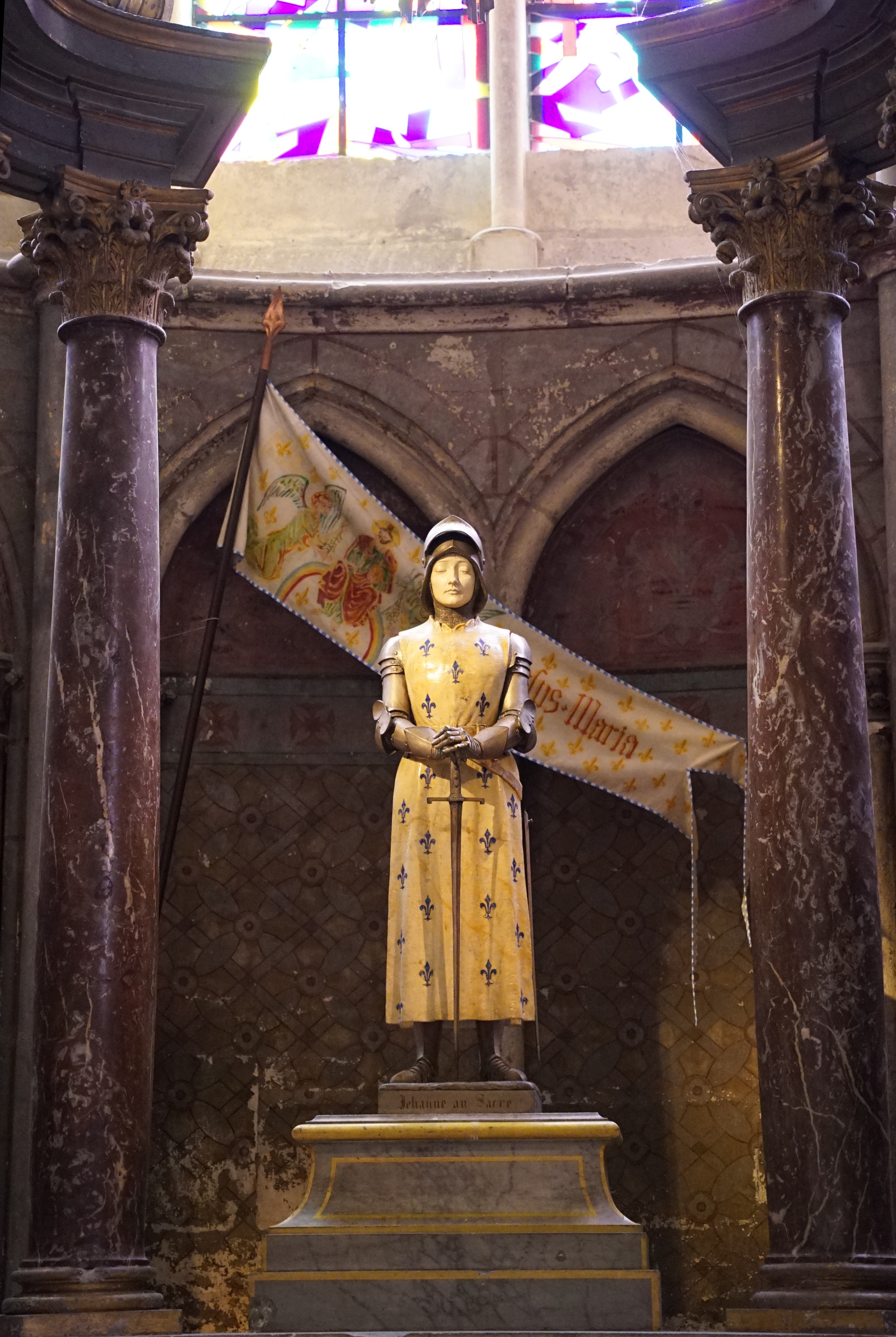
The statue of Joan of Arc in the chapel of her name

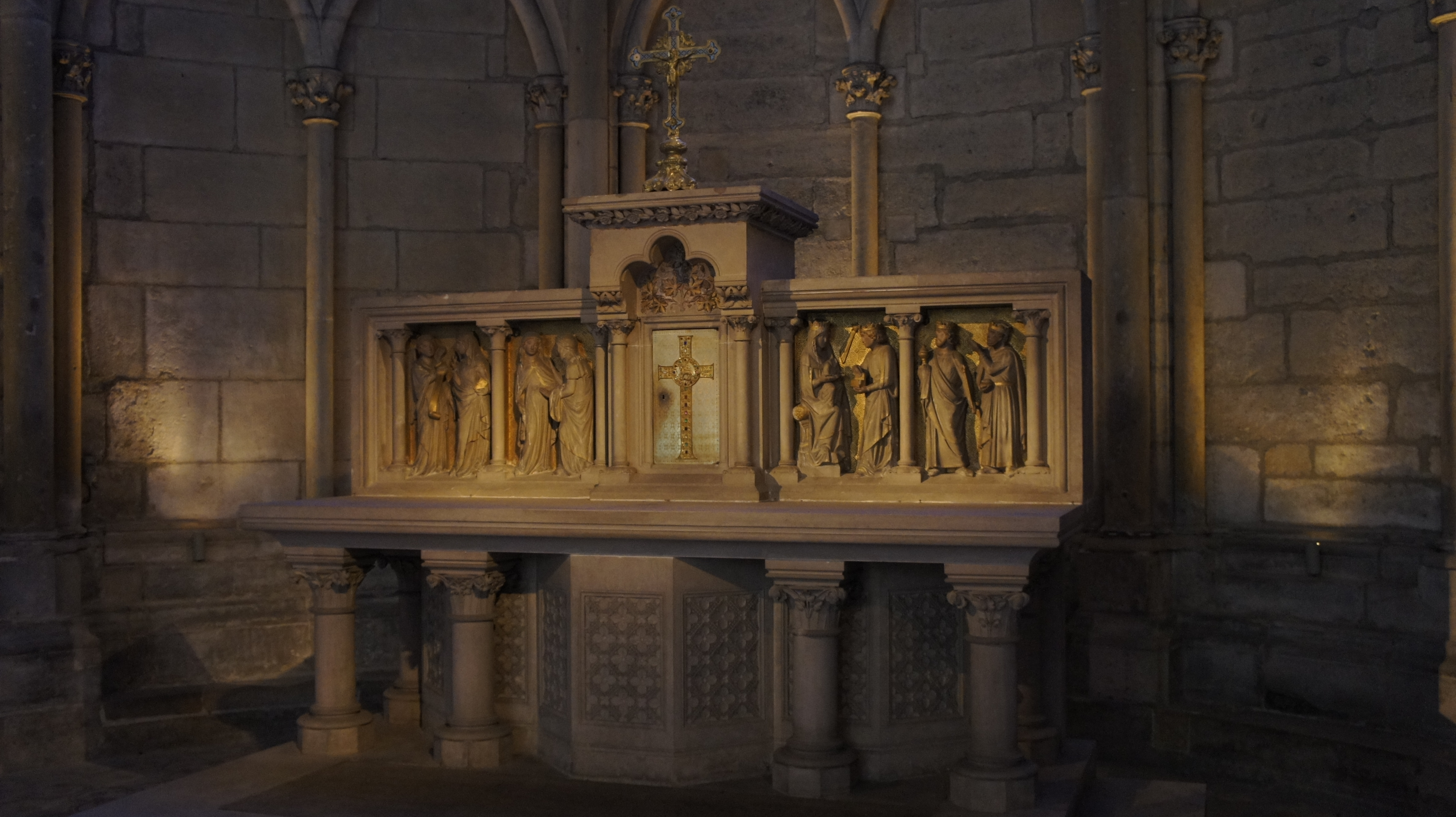
The retable and altar in the axial chapel

=== Organ ===
The original grand pipe organ in the cathedral dated to the 15th century but was largely destroyed by the fire of 1481. The organ-case was reconstructed in 1487 and reconstructed again in 1647. The grand organ is located in the north transept, just below the rose window, and is surmounted by a sculpture of Christ giving a blessing and two angels playing trumpet. The lower portion of the woodwork, with carved panels and pilasters, dates to the 18th century.

The organ suffered further damage in the First World War, and was rebuilt again. It was inaugurated in 1938. It is the fifth largest in France, with six thousand six hundred pipes, eighty-five stops or distinct sounds played by four keyboards, sixty-one notes, and thirty-two foot pedals. It is used frequently for concerts.

A smaller organ, installed in 1927, is installed in the choir.

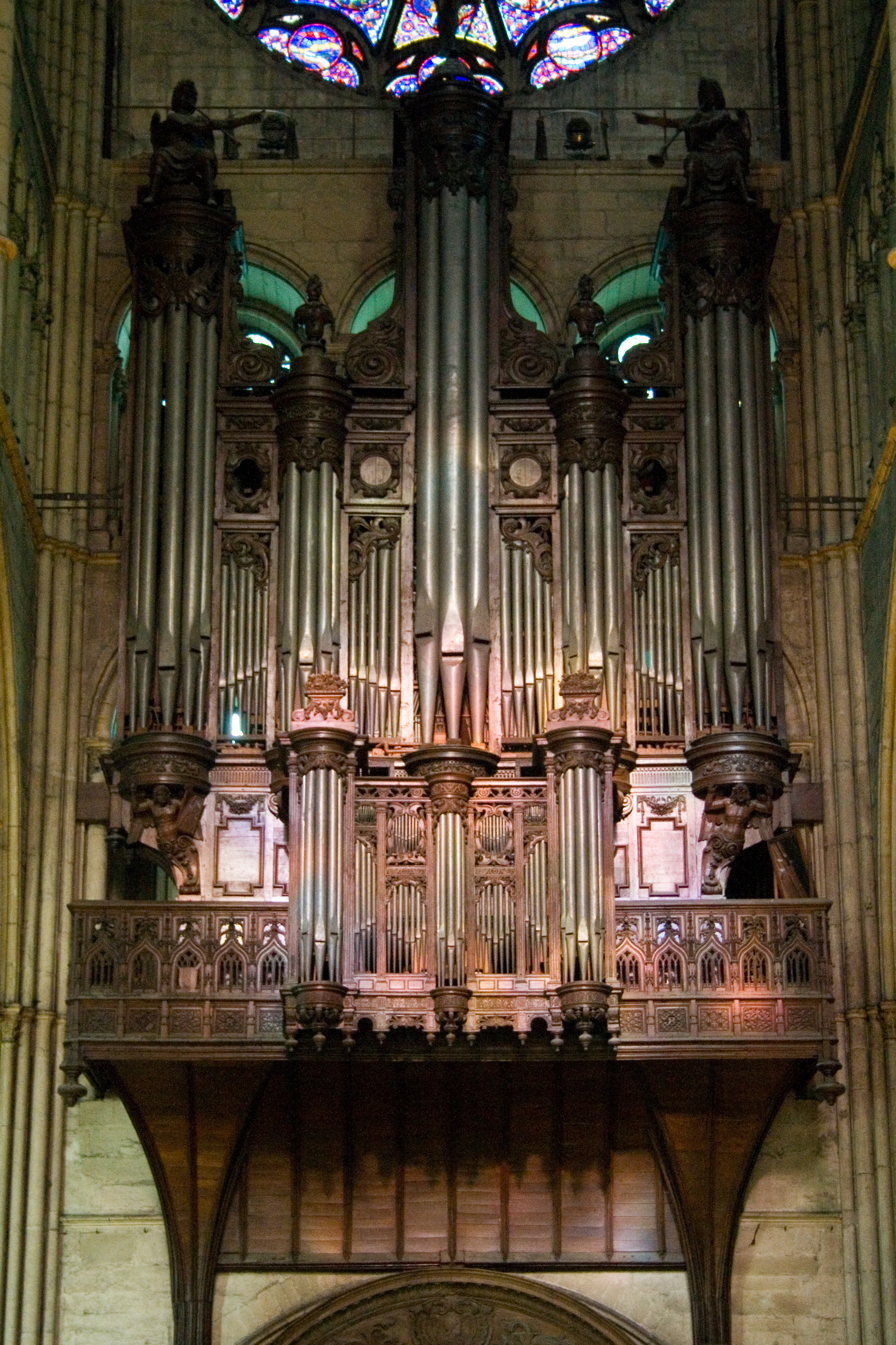
Grand organ in the north transept

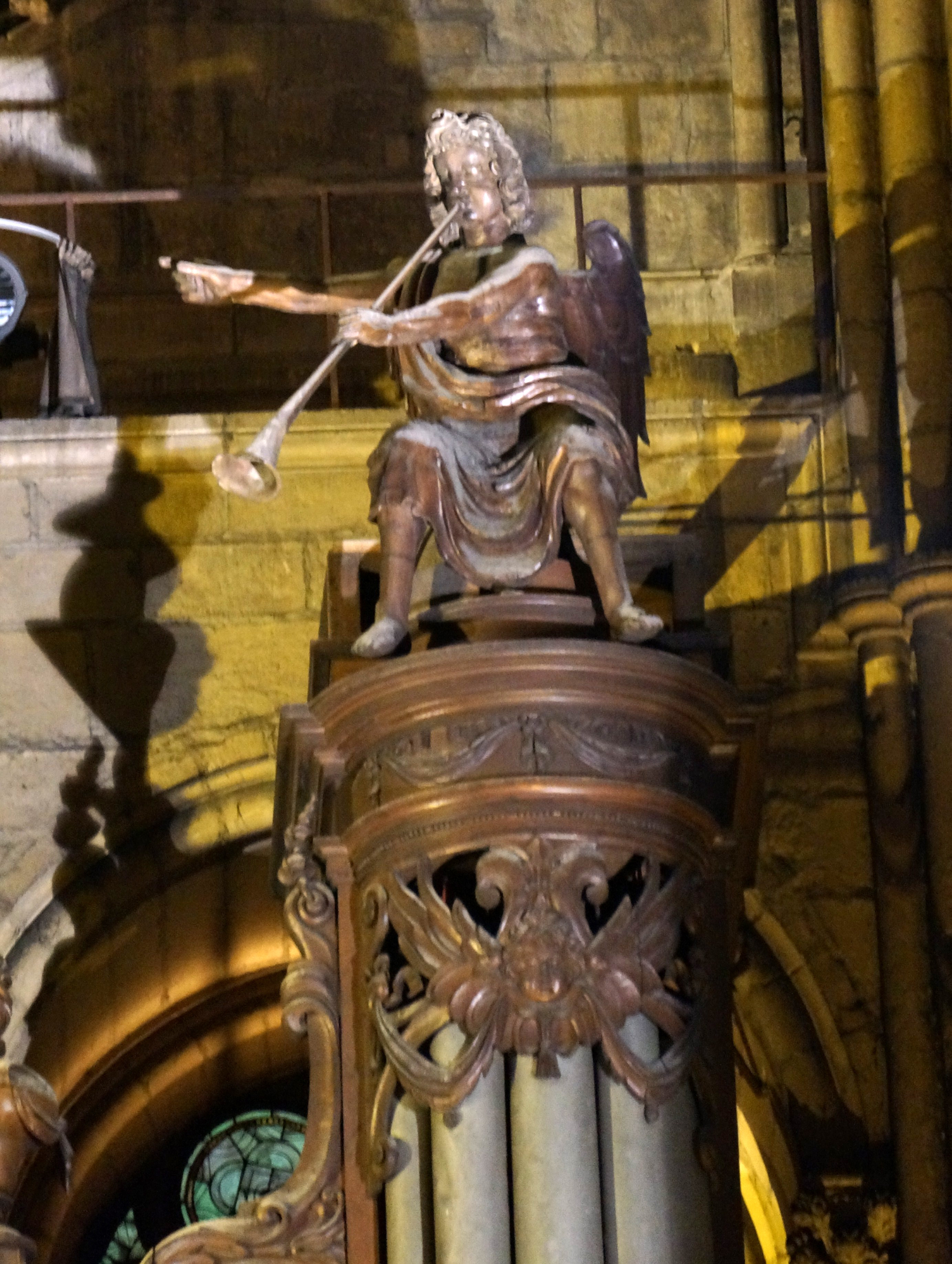
Decoration of the grand organ

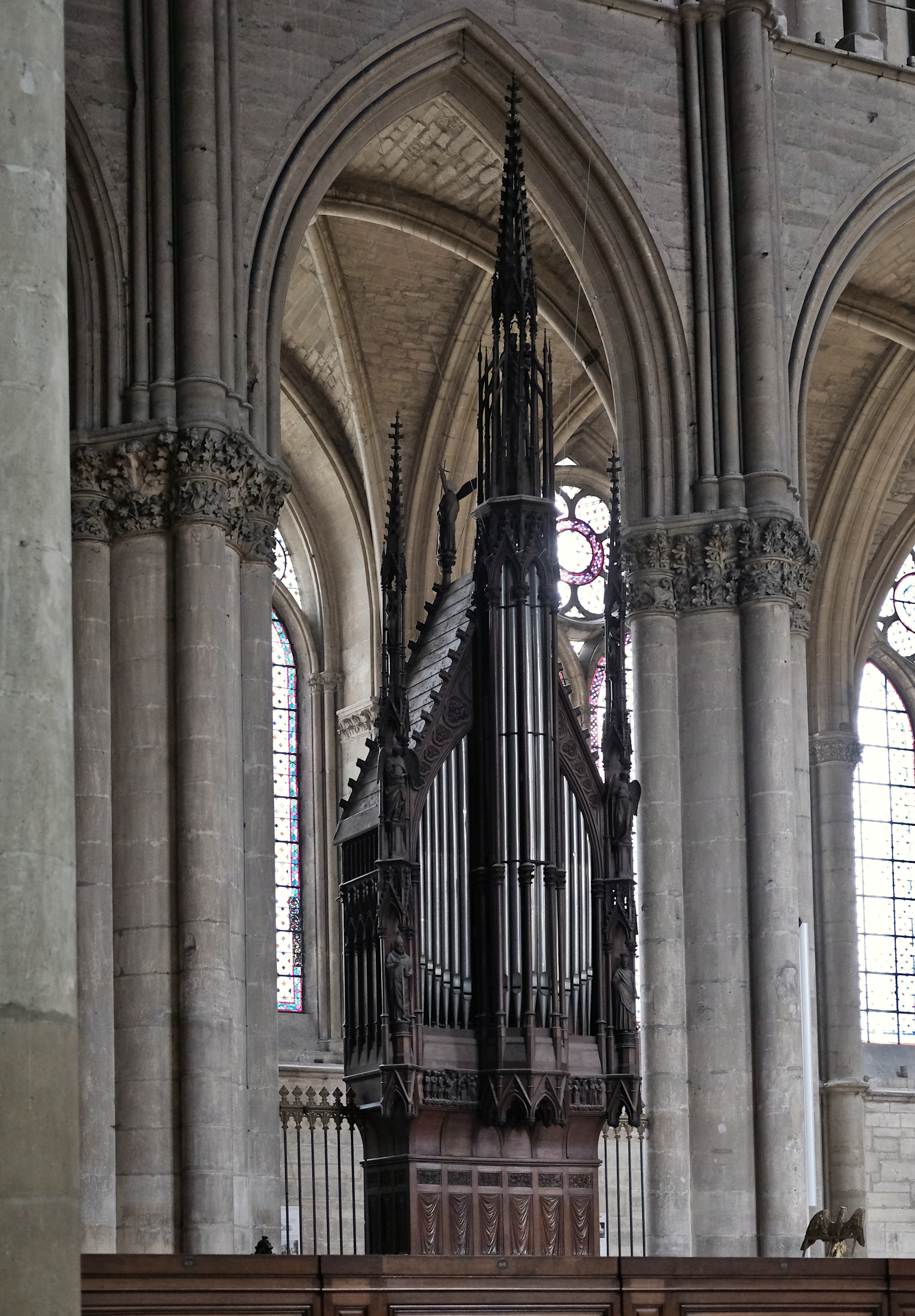
Organ of the choir

== Stained glass ==
=== Interior of west façade ===
In the interior of the west façade, much of the original glass remains, though it has gone through several restorations. The centre of the west rose window depicts the Dormition of the Virgin. It complements the scene of the crowning of the Virgin Mary in sculpture on the exterior of the façade The circles of glass medallions in the window, from the centre outwards, represent the twelve apostles, angel musicians, and the kings and prophets of the Old Testament. The windows in the bays of the triforium, just below the rose window, depict the coronations of the kings of France, and are the stained glass equivalent of the gallery of kings on the façade.

The windows in the west portals are more modern; the small rose over the central portal was made by Jacques Simon in 1938, and is devoted to scenes related to the Virgin Mary, while the glass in the lateral tympanums is from 1959, with scenes from the life of Christ.

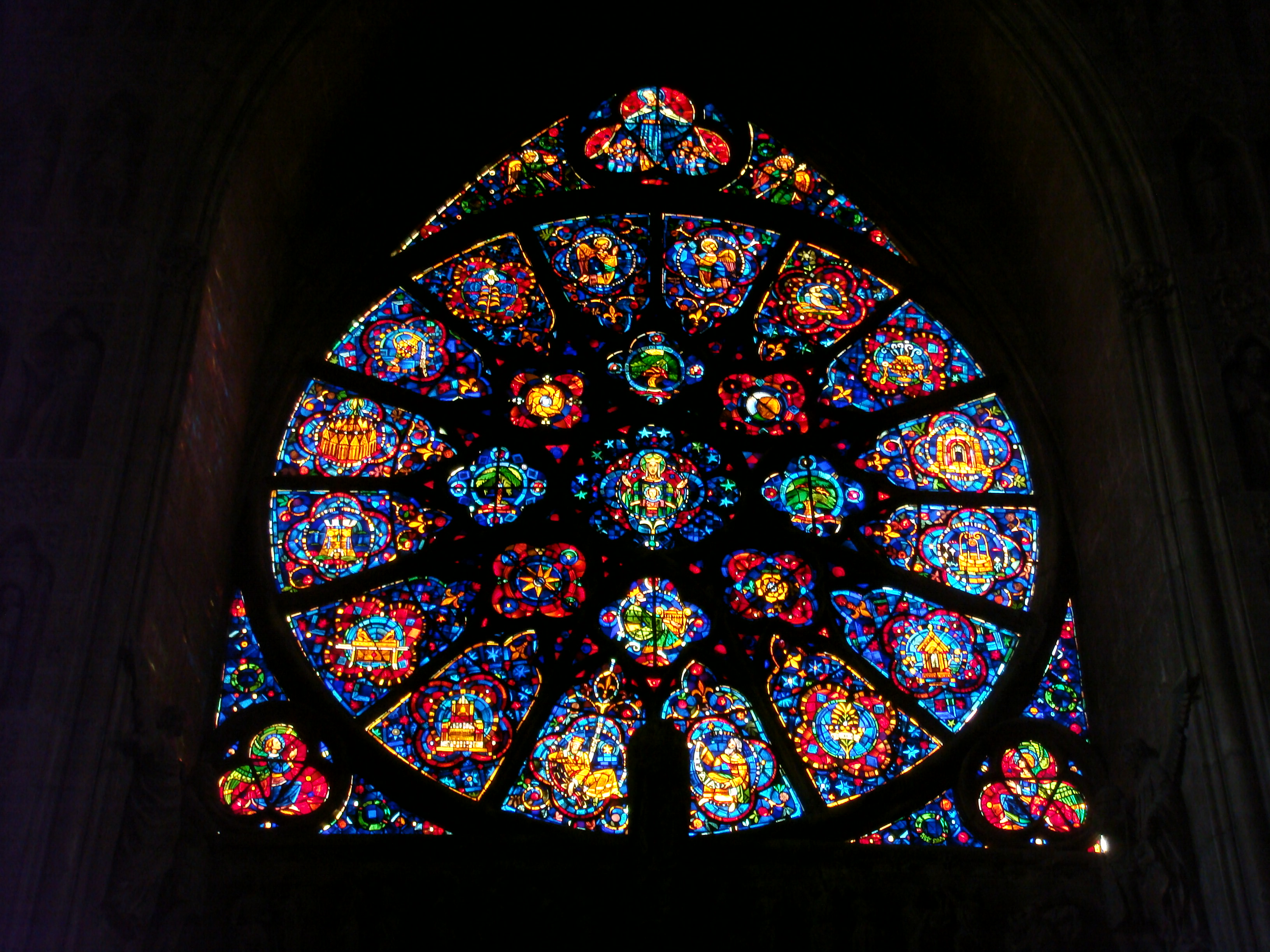
West portal rose window

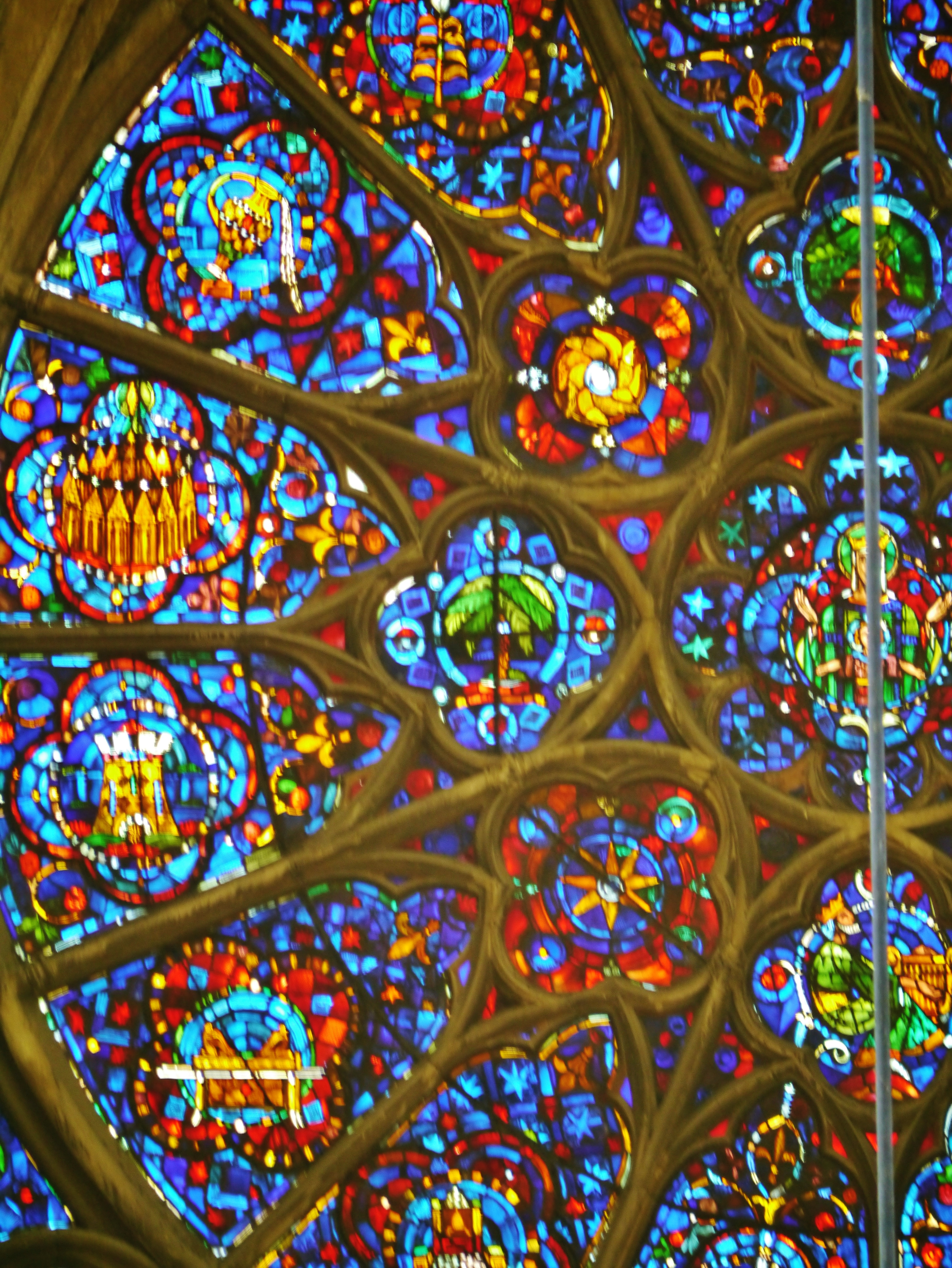
Detail of the west rose window

=== Nave ===
Up until the First World War, the upper windows of the nave preserved nearly all of their original glass. Each of the thirty-six windows depicted a bishop on the lower level, and a king of France on the upper level. The arcades depicted in glass over the heads of the kings were crowded with angels, suggesting that the kings were the earthly representatives of the celestial kingdom. Only four of these original windows survived intact in traverses eight to eleven of the nave, in the two bays closest to the transept, protected by the towers of the transept. The others were recreated with a mixture of medieval and modern glass.

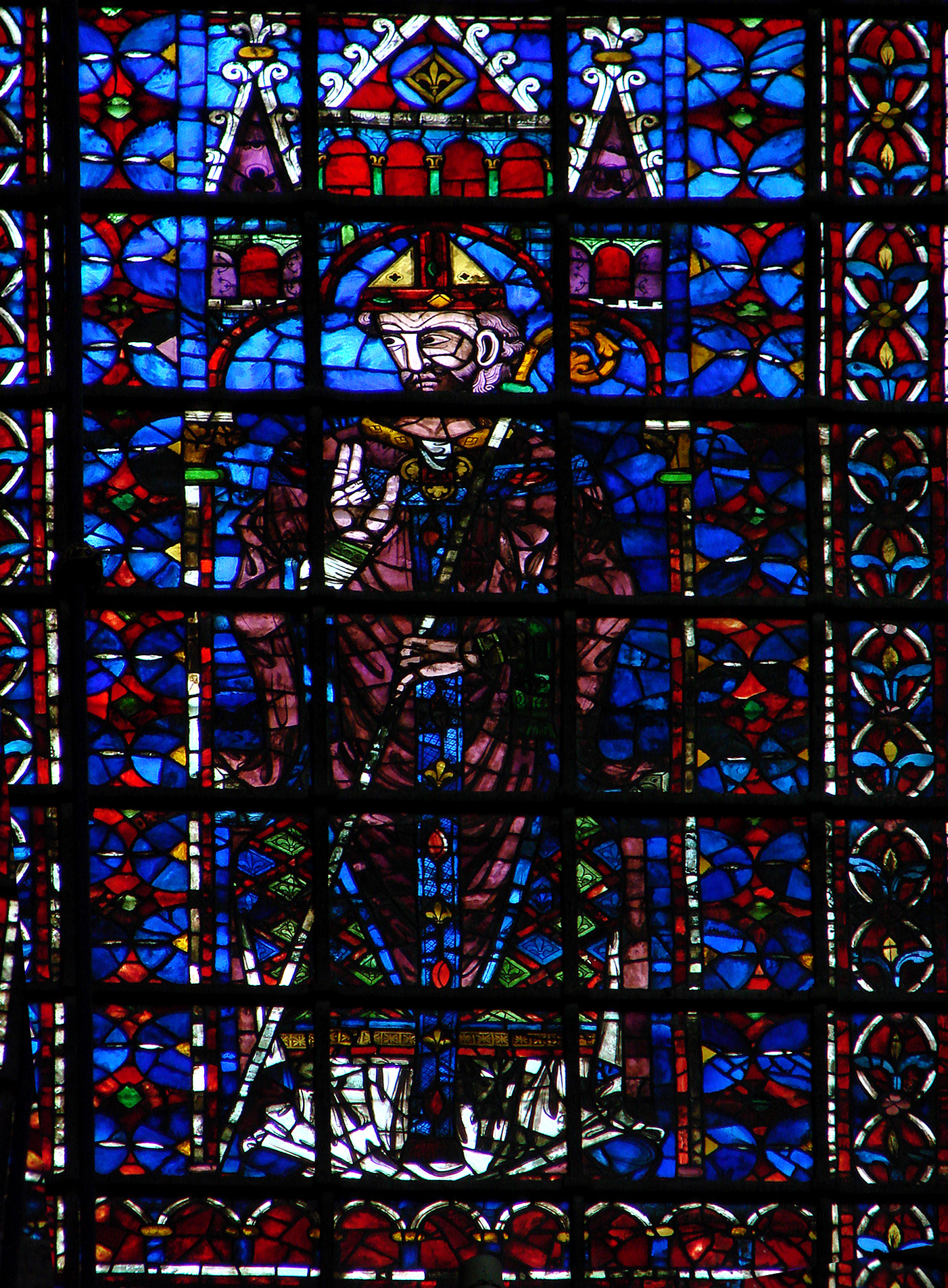
13th-century nave window representing a bishop

=== Transept ===
The north rose window in the transept represents the biblical Creation, and still has much of its original 13th-century glass. The central figure is God the creator, matching the sculptural theme on the exterior of the transept. The Virgin Mary in the window is depicted as the new Eve.

The upper windows of the Transept are largely composed of white grisaille glass; many of which also date to the 13th century; these brought a maximum of light into the transept, the part of the cathedral used for the coronation ceremony.

The lower windows of the south façade of the transept, in the Chapel of Saint Remi, have an unusual theme, particular to the region. They celebrate the role of the monk Dom Perignon in the history of the French wine industry, and the making of champagne and other local wines. The windows were created in the 1950s by Jacques Simon. Another group of unusual modern windows is found in the bays of the transept and the two right chapels of the choir. These are grisaille or white glass windows, in abstract patterns, conceived and painted by Brigitte Simon beginning in 1961.

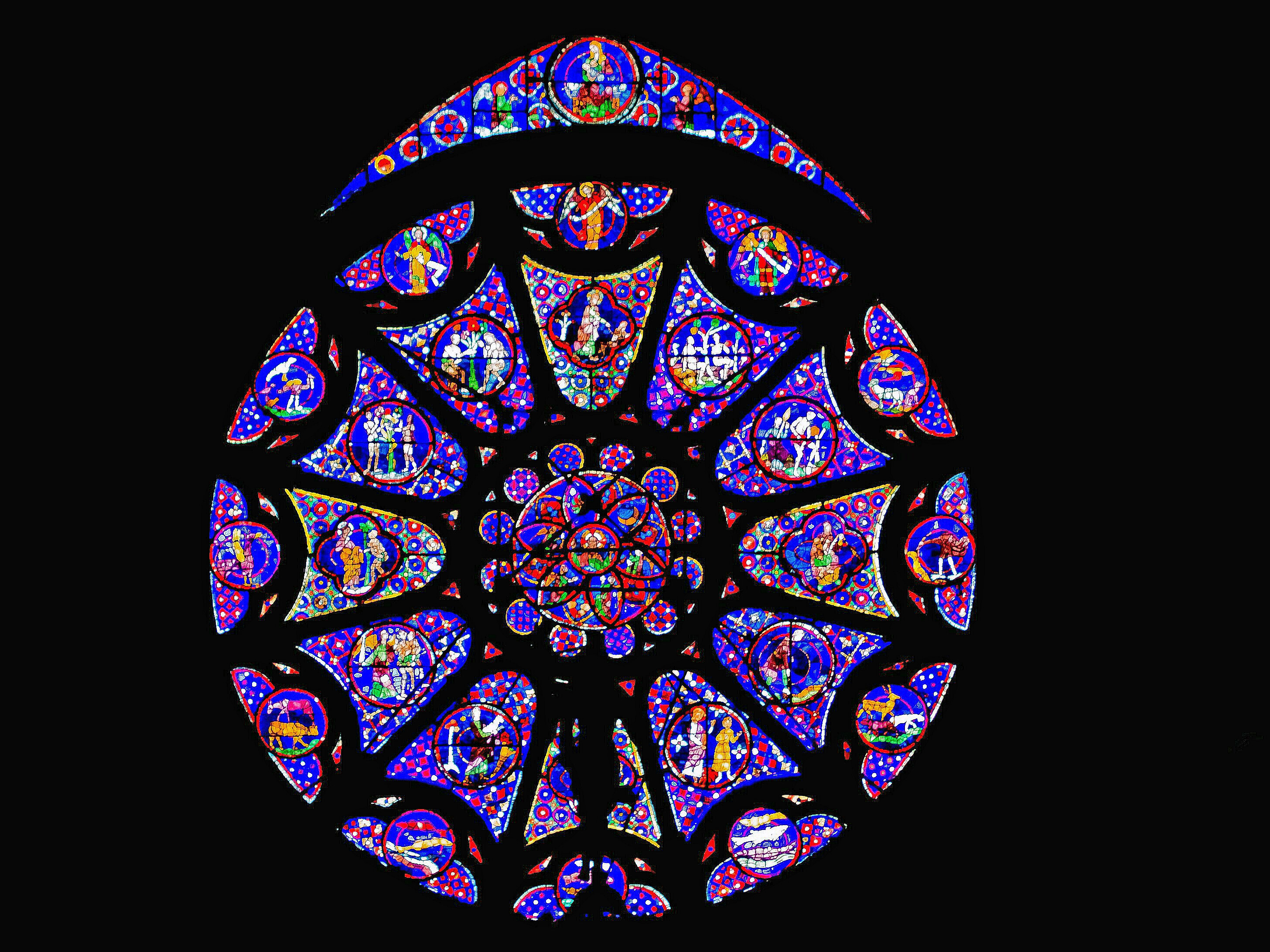
North transept rose window

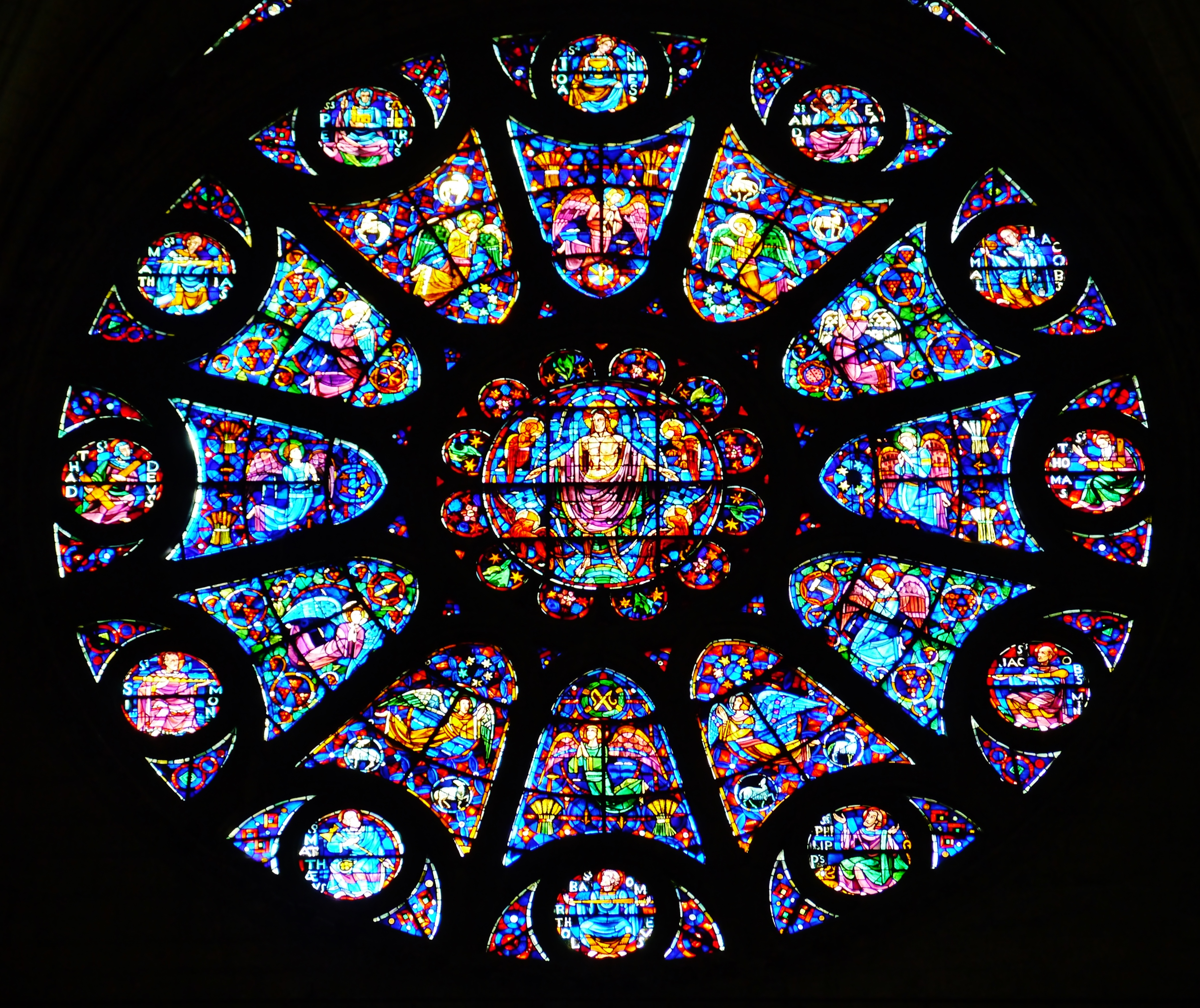
South transept rose window

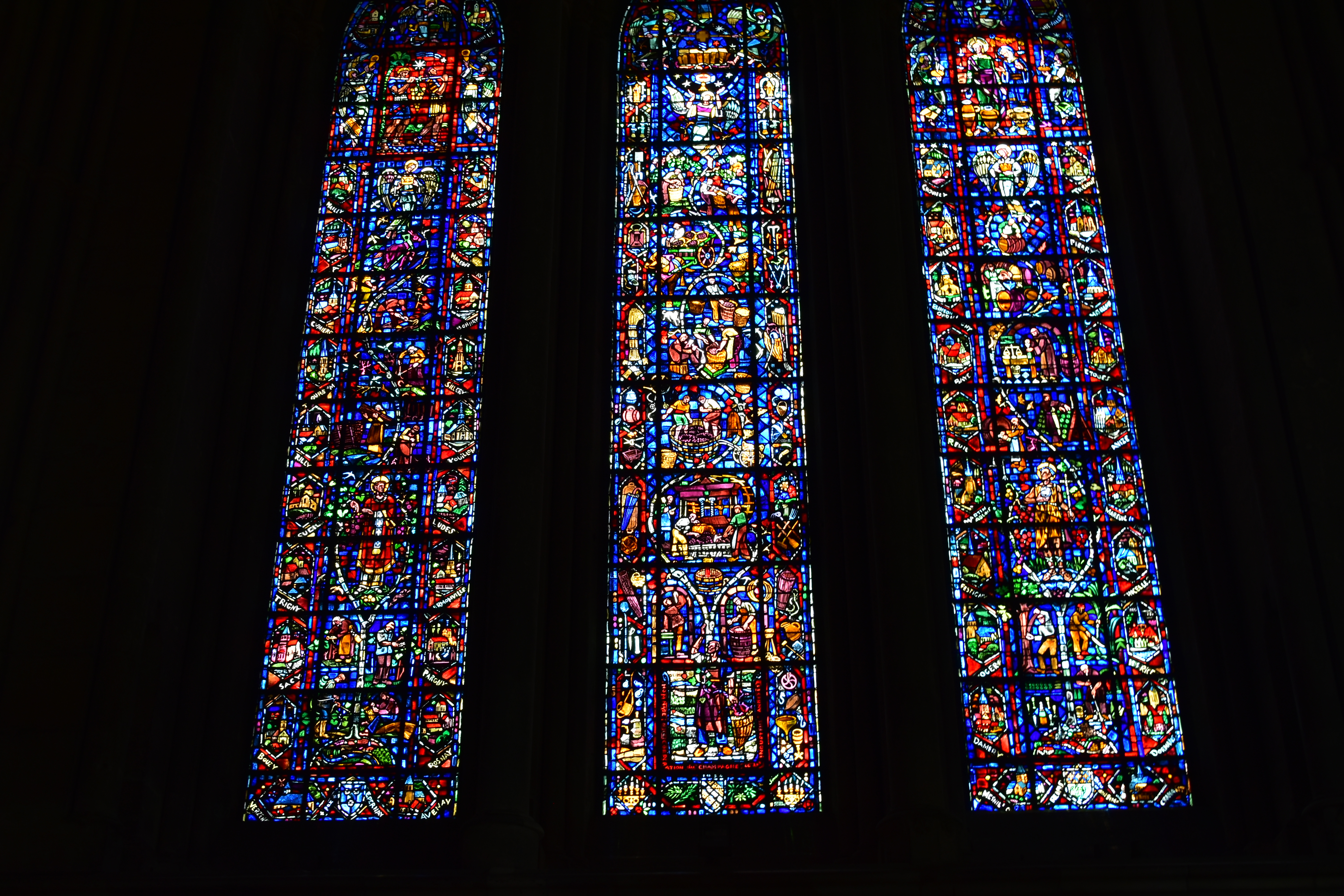
Windows celebrating the monk Dom Perignon and the local French champagne industry

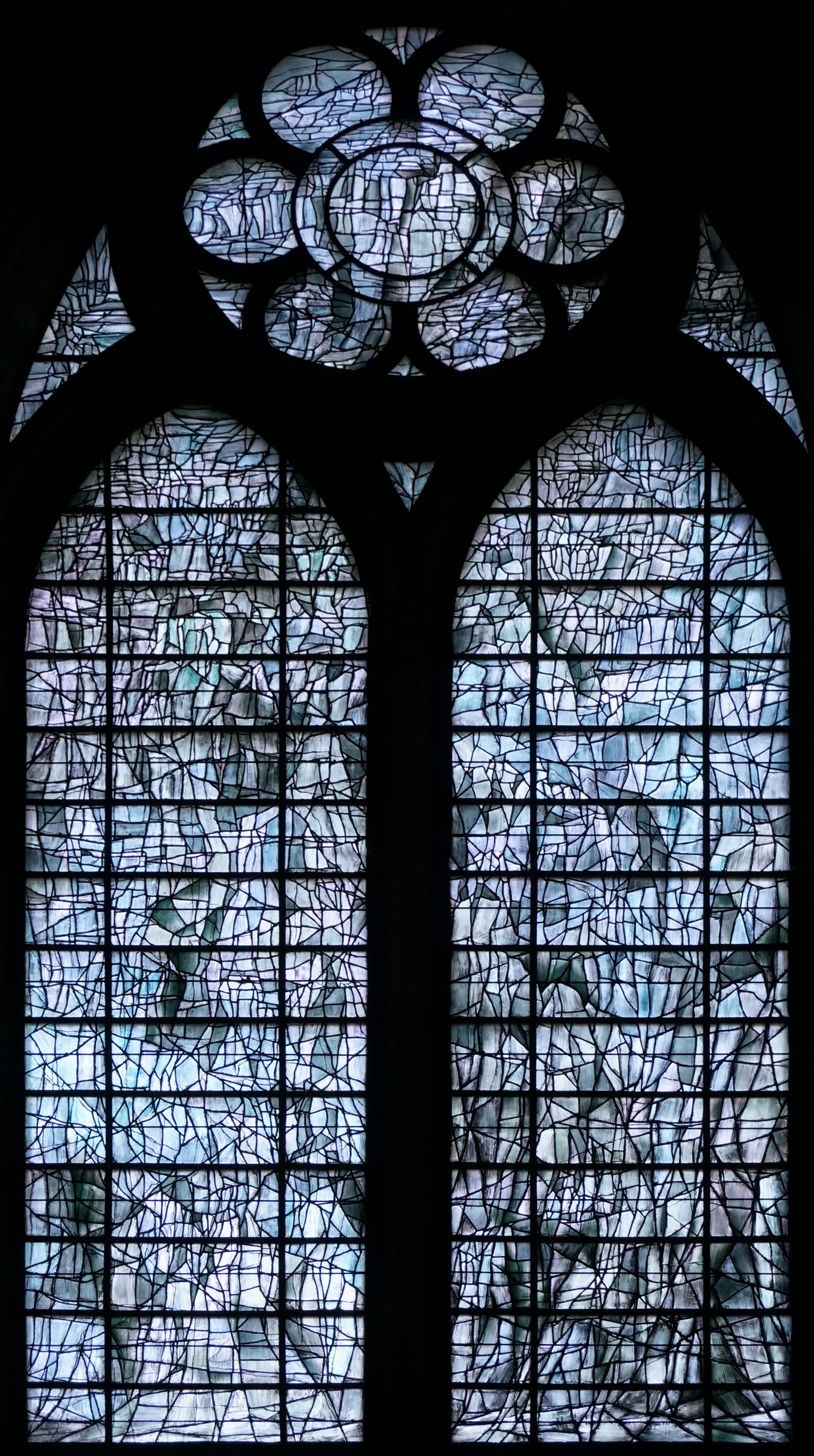
Abstract grisaille window by Brigitte Simon

=== Choir and chapel windows ===
A few of the higher windows in the Choir have their original 13th-century glass, though most have been heavily restored or reassembled. One example is the window depicting the archbishop Henri de Braine, in the axial chapel of the Choir.

Some of the best-known windows in the cathedral are modern, and are found in the axial chapel at the east end of the cathedral. These are the three windows made by Marc Chagall in association with glass artist Charles Marq. They represent the Tree of Jesse (the genealogy of Christ); the Old and New Testament; and the "Grandes Heures de Reims".

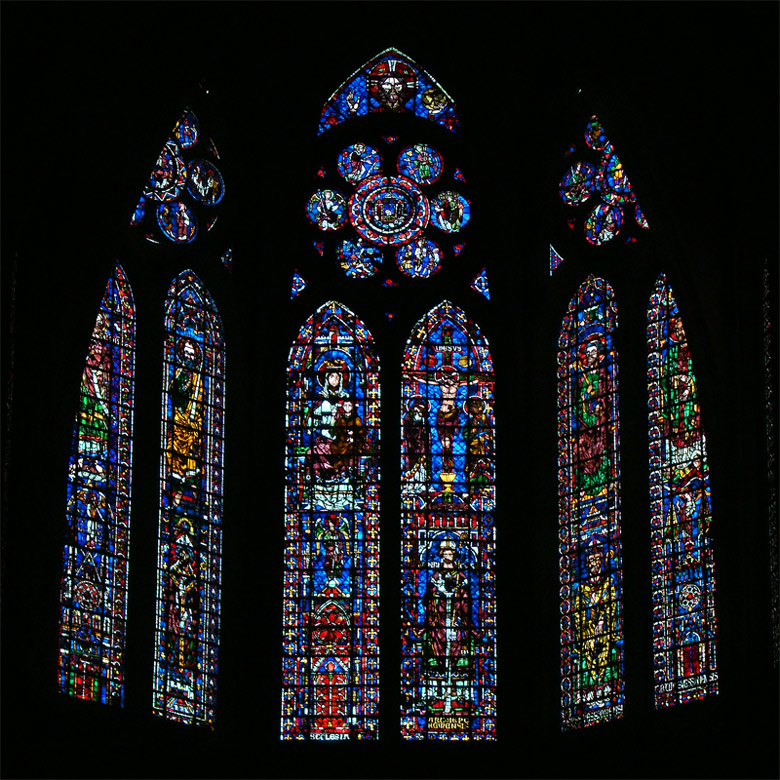
Windows of the three high bays of the axial chapel

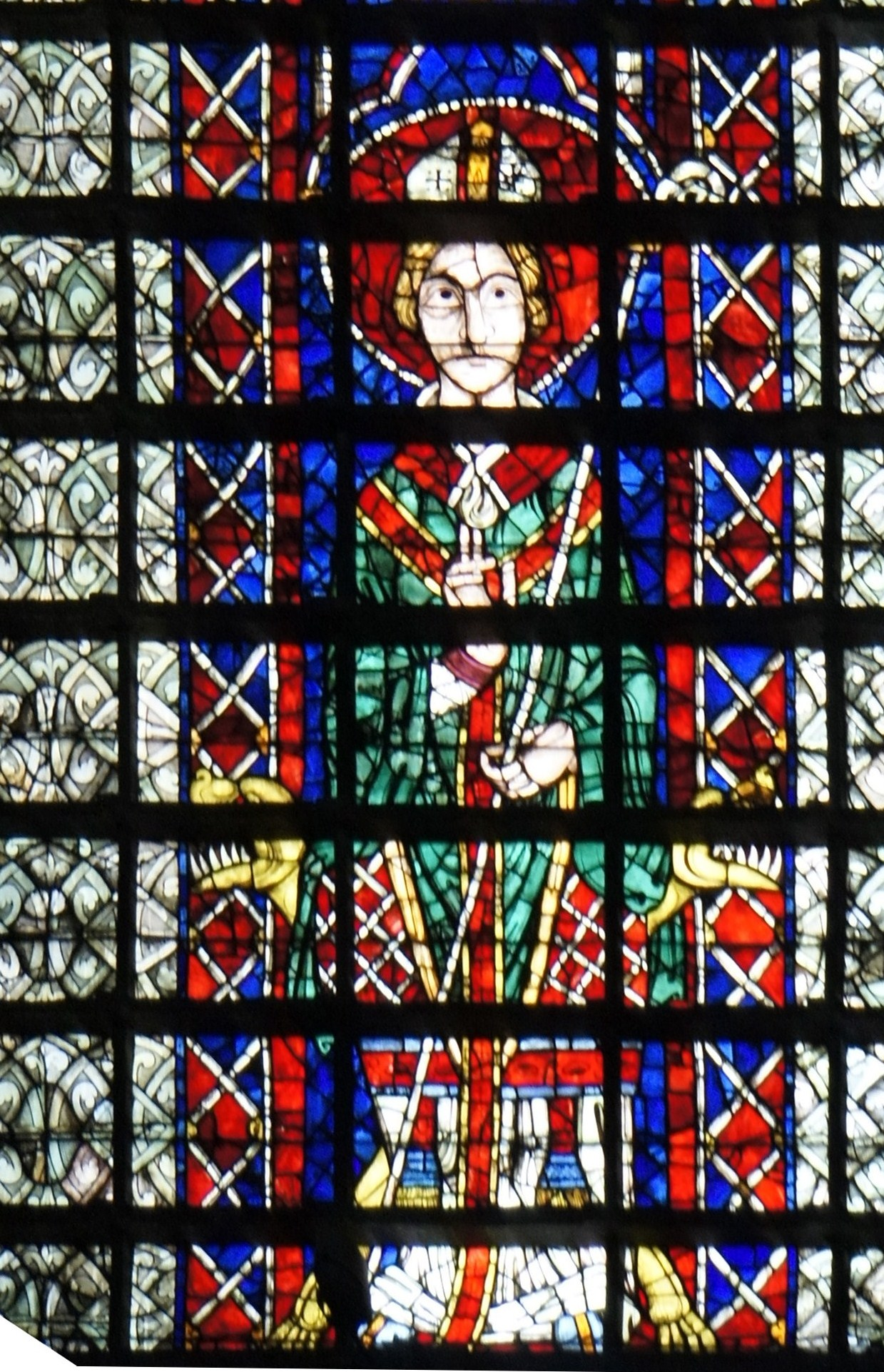
Archbishop Henri de Braine, in the axial chapel

== Episcopal palace and treasury ==
The episcopal palace, known as the Palace of Tau, adjoins the cathedral on the south side of the apse. It was the residence of the archbishop, and also was the setting for the banquet given in honour of the new kings of France after their coronation.

The episcopal palace has its own chapel, in the High Gothic style, directly alongside the cathedral. It has no collateral aisles and three levels, with tall lancet windows, and is more sober in its decoration than the neighbouring cathedral. It previously had its own flèche or spire, a symbol of the status of an archbishop. The adjoining residential wing was originally constructed in the Flamboyant Gothic style, but was largely reconstructed between 1686 and 1693 by the architect Robert de Cotte in a more classical style, including a triangular fronton over its façade a monumental double stairway. The upper floor of this wing contains the hall used for the coronation banquets.

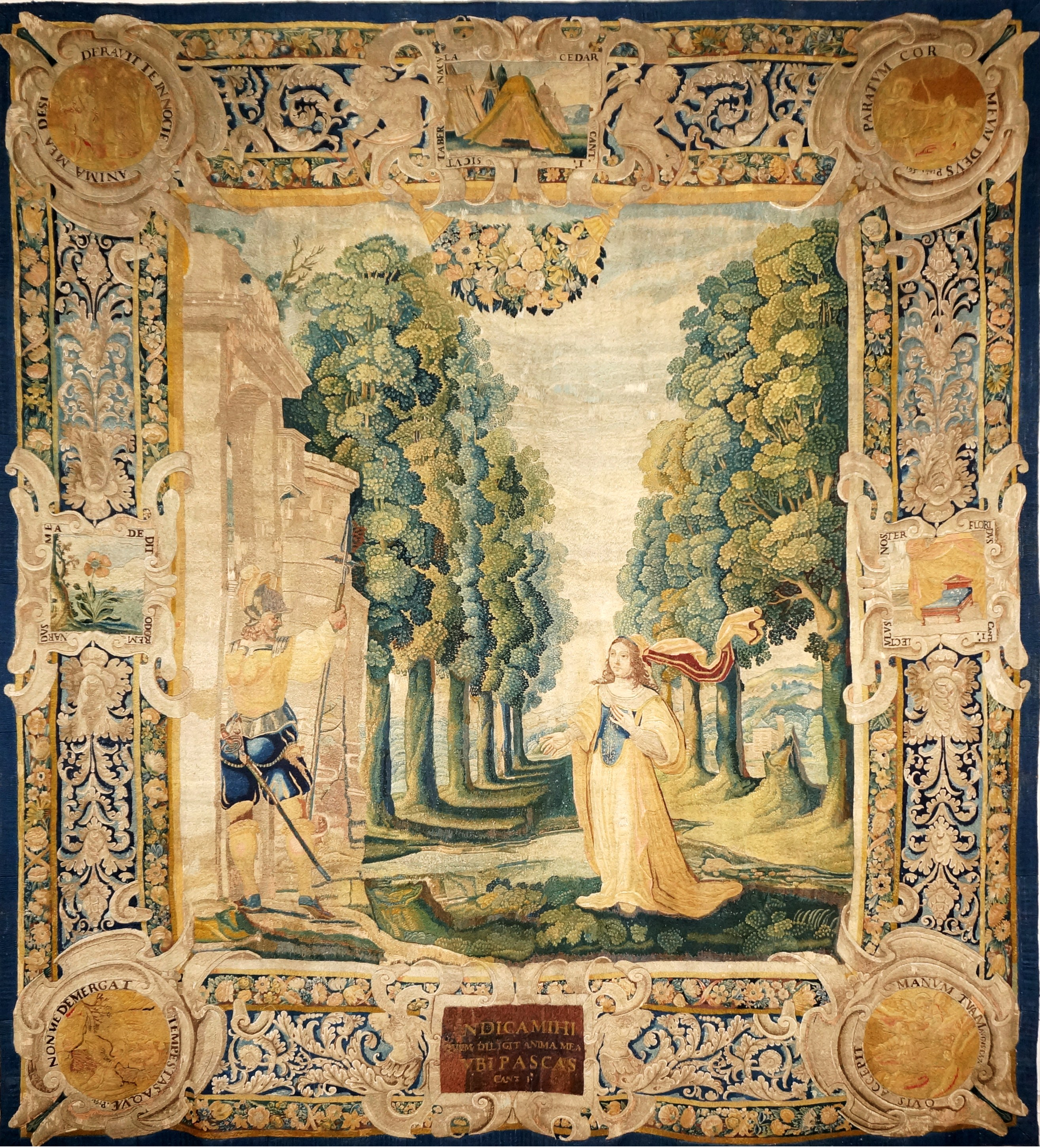
Bride meets the groom, in the "Song of Songs" Tapestry (16th century)

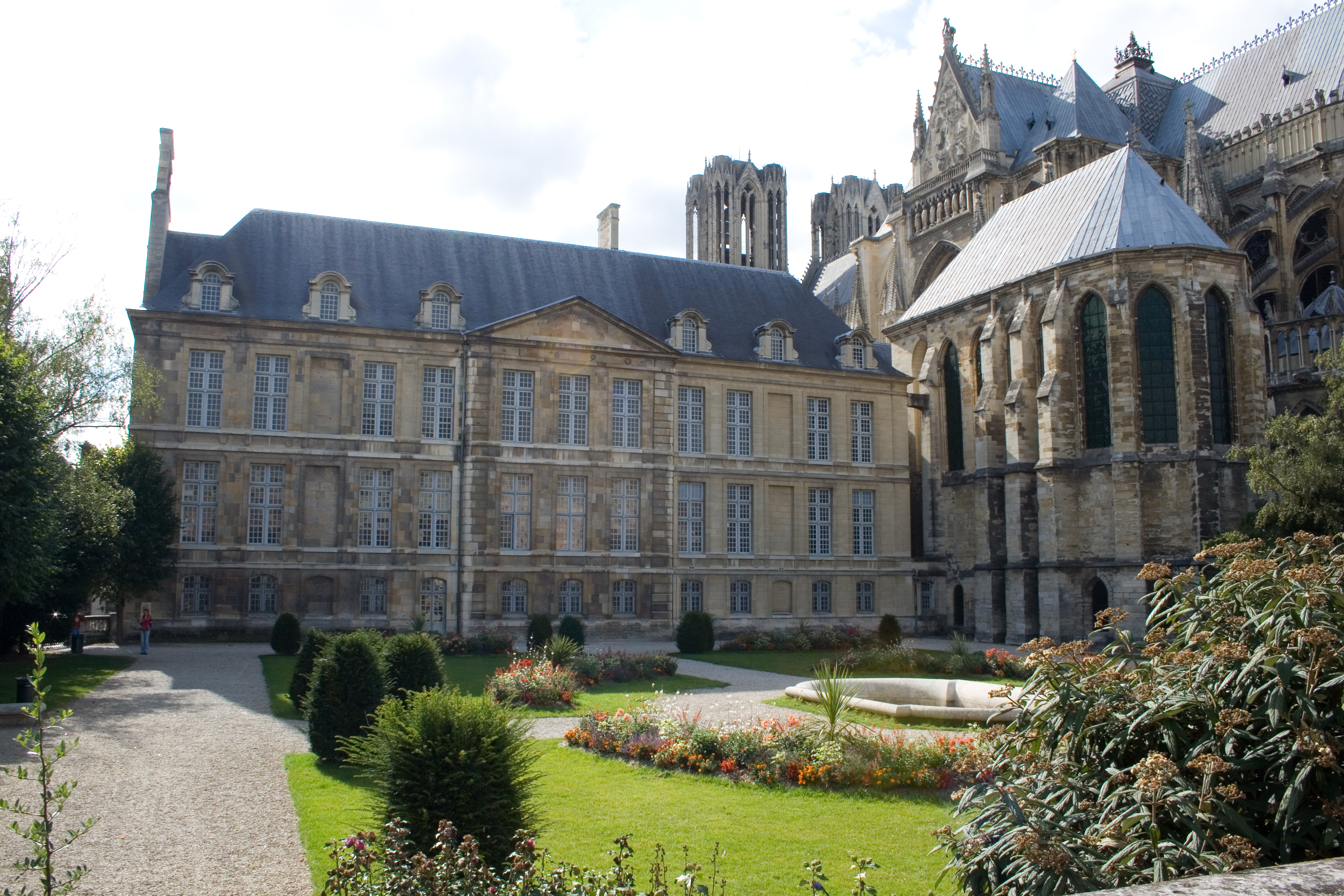
The Palace of Tau, or archiepiscopal palace, with its chapel on the right

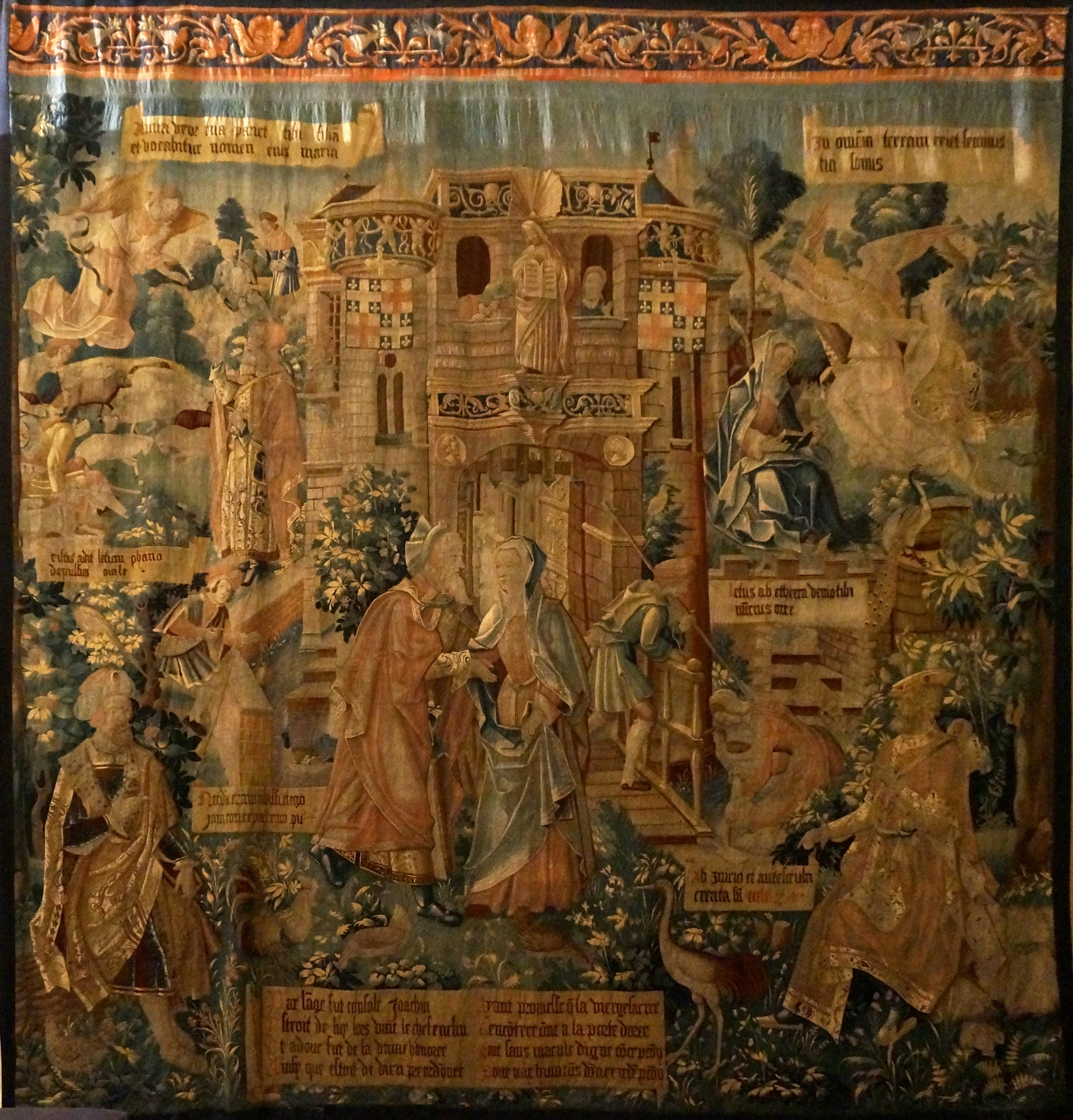
Tapestry from the Life of the Virgin Series (16th century)

The cathedral art collection includes a very fine collection of tapestries, which formerly hung in the choir of the cathedral, and now are displayed in the cathedral aisles in summer season and in the Palace of Tau during the rest of the year. Two tapestries, made in Flanders, depict scenes from life of the Clovis. They were presented, as part of a larger set to the cathedral in 1573 by Cardinal Charles of Lorraine. Another set of tapestries was presented to the cathedral in 1530 by Robert de Lenoncourt, archbishop under Francis I (1515–1547). They are of either local or possibly Flemish manufacture, and represent the life of the Virgin, and the how her role may have been prefigured in the Old Testament.

The cathedral treasury contains an important collection of precious objects, particularly reliquaries, some of which were used in coronations or donated by French monarchs at the time of their coronation. These include the Holy Ampulla (French: Sainte Ampoule, lit. 'holy ampulla'), the successor of the ancient one that contained the oil with which French kings were anointed. It was broken during the French Revolution, but a fragment is contained in the present flask. The Talisman of Charlemagne (12th century), contains a purported fragment of the True Cross, and is decorated with sapphires, gold, emeralds and pearls. The "Chalice of Saint Remigius" is said to be the cup used in the coronation of Clovis, and was used in later coronations. It is a 12th-century cup adorned in the 19th century with pearls and precious stones.

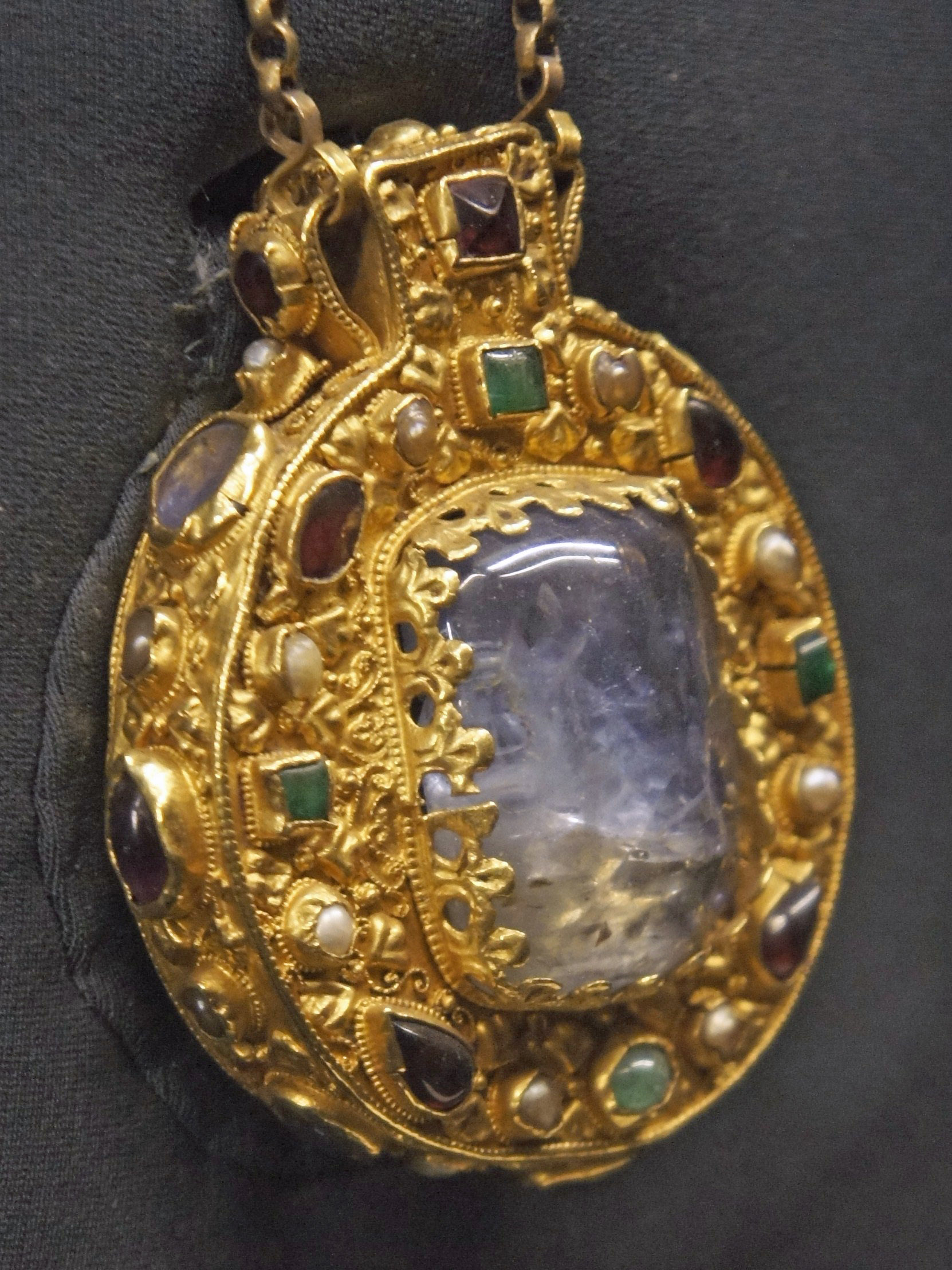
The talisman of Charlemagne (12th century)

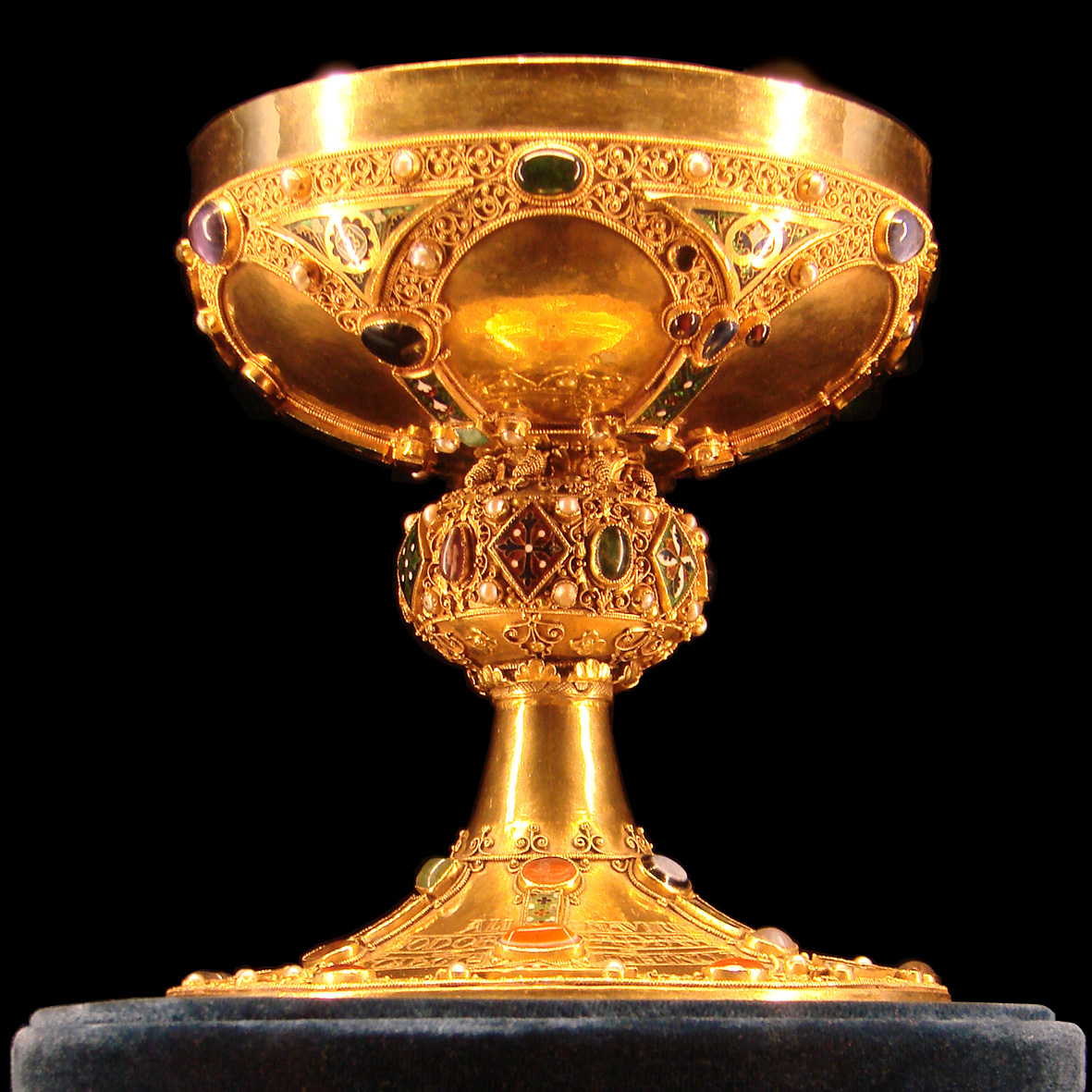
The chalice of Saint Remigius, used at French coronations (12th and 19th c.)

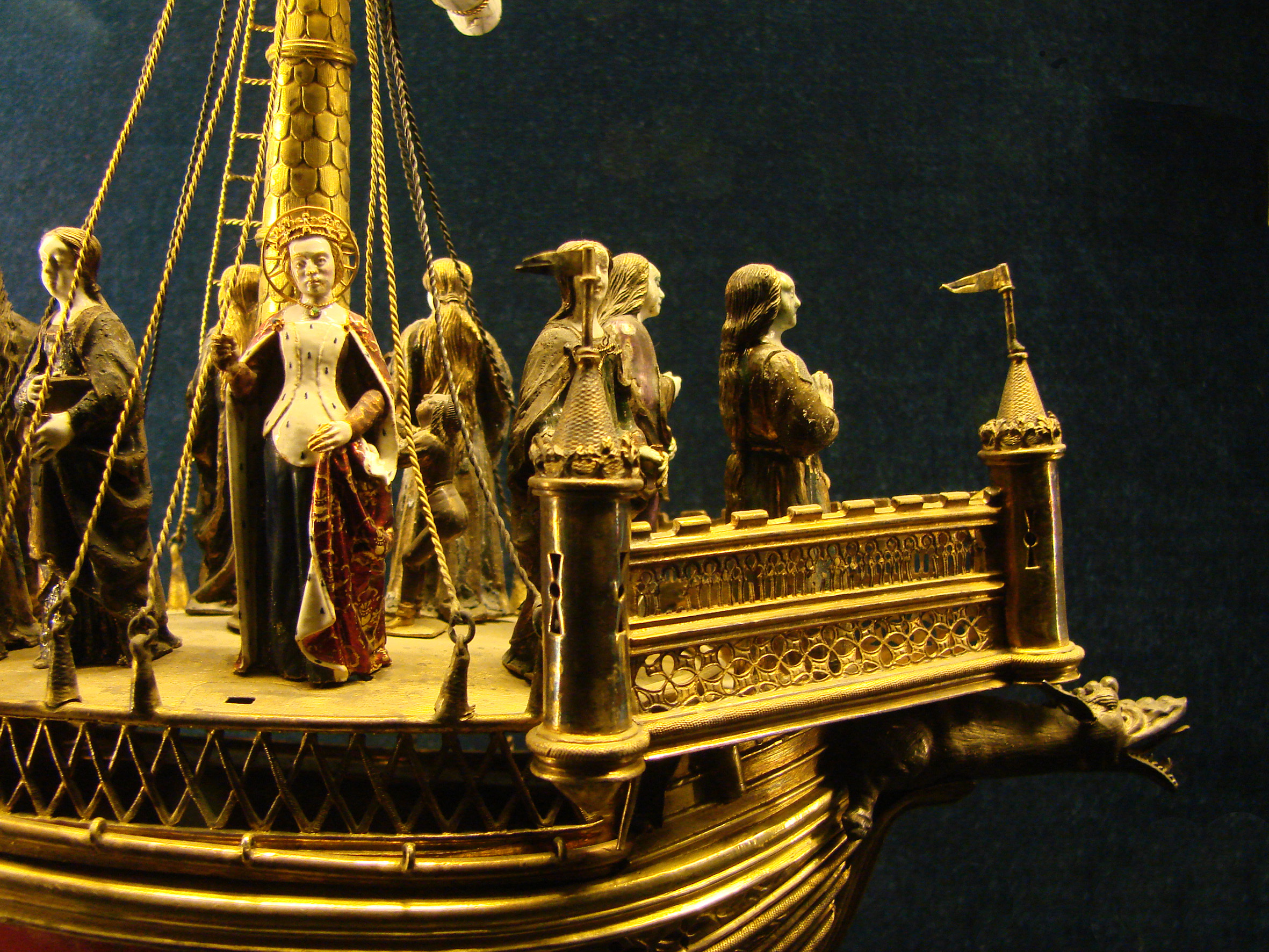
Detail of the reliquary of Saint Ursula (16th century)

== 800th anniversary ==
In 2011, the city of Reims celebrated the cathedral's 800th anniversary. The celebrations ran from 6 May to 23 October. Concerts, street performances, exhibitions, conferences, and a series of evening light shows highlighted the cathedral and its 800th anniversary. In addition, six new stained glass windows designed by Imi Knoebel, a German artist, were inaugurated on 25 June 2011. The six windows cover an area of 128 m^{2} (1,380 ft^{2}) and are positioned on both sides of the Chagall windows in the apse of the cathedral.

== Gallery ==
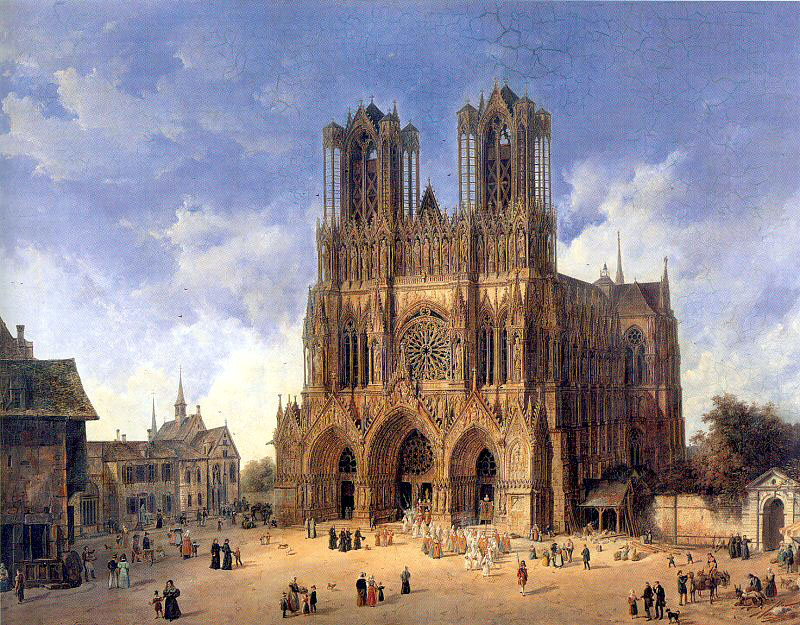
The Cathedral of Reims, by Domenico Quaglio the Younger

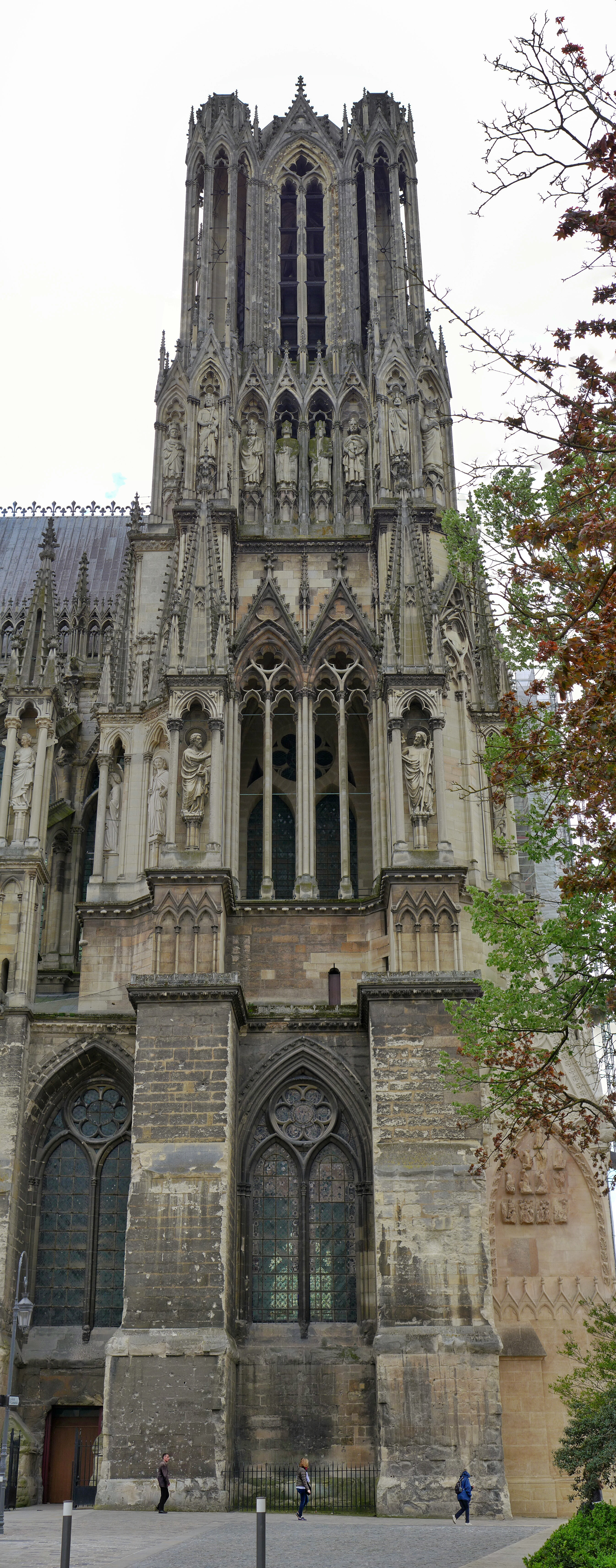
North tower

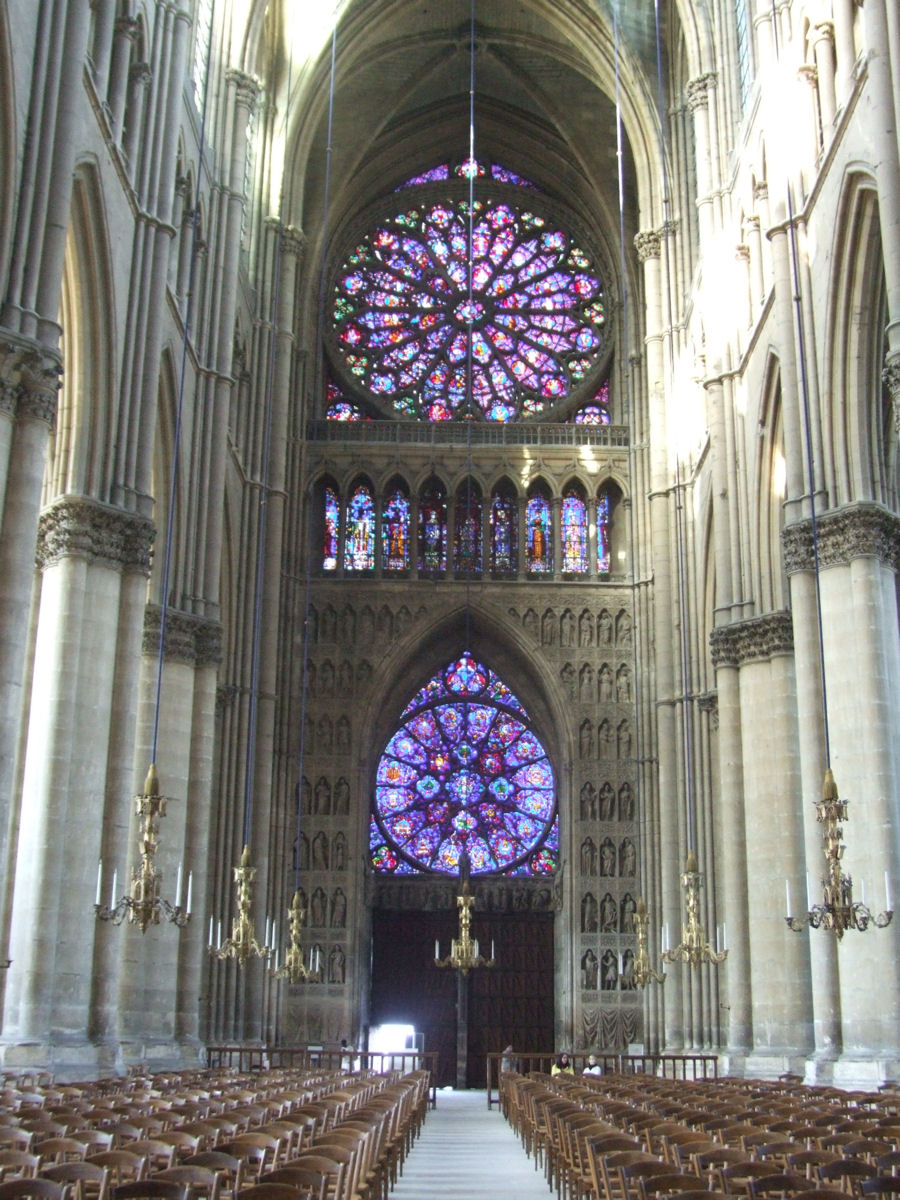
Rose windows, west end

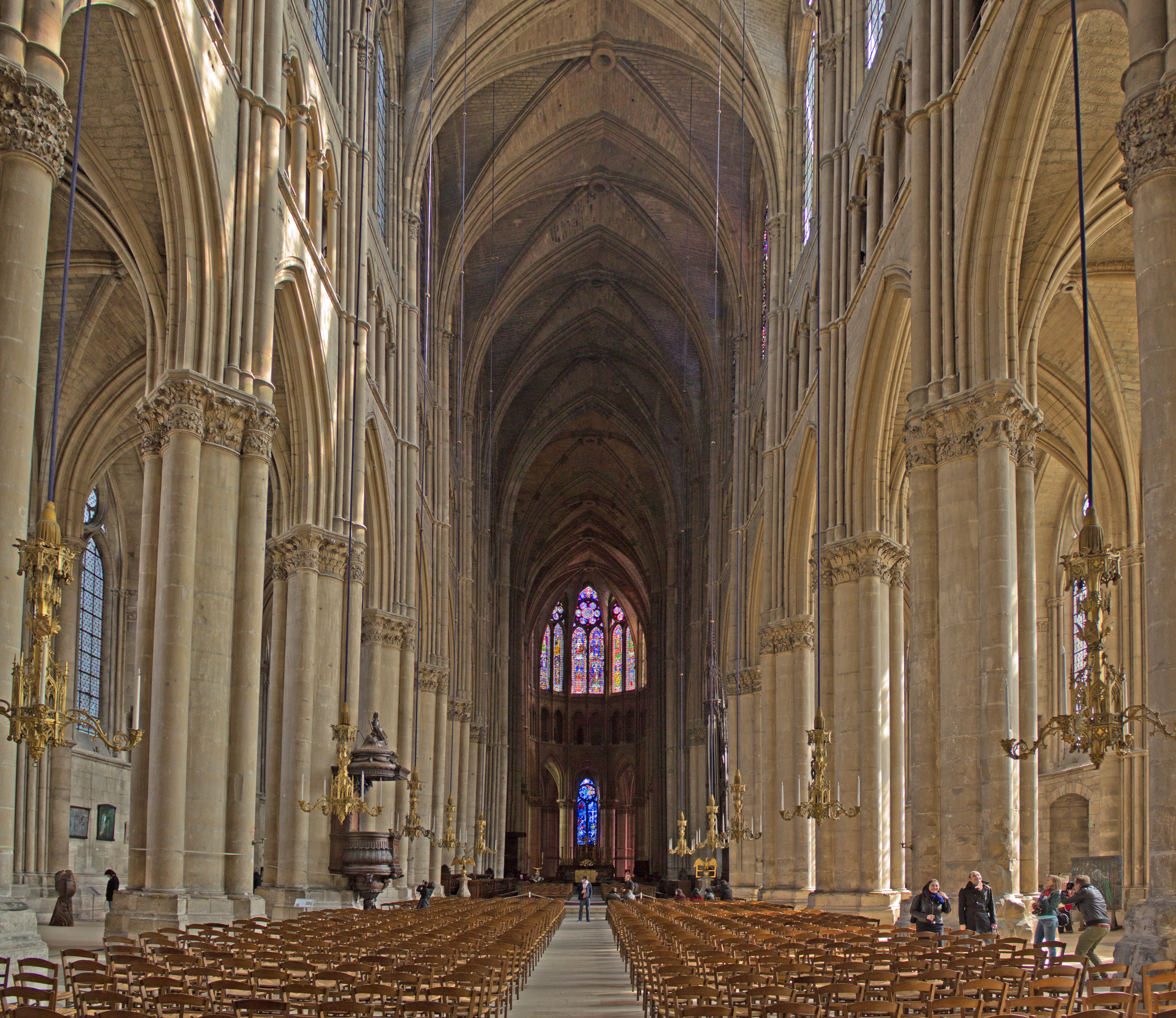
Interior view

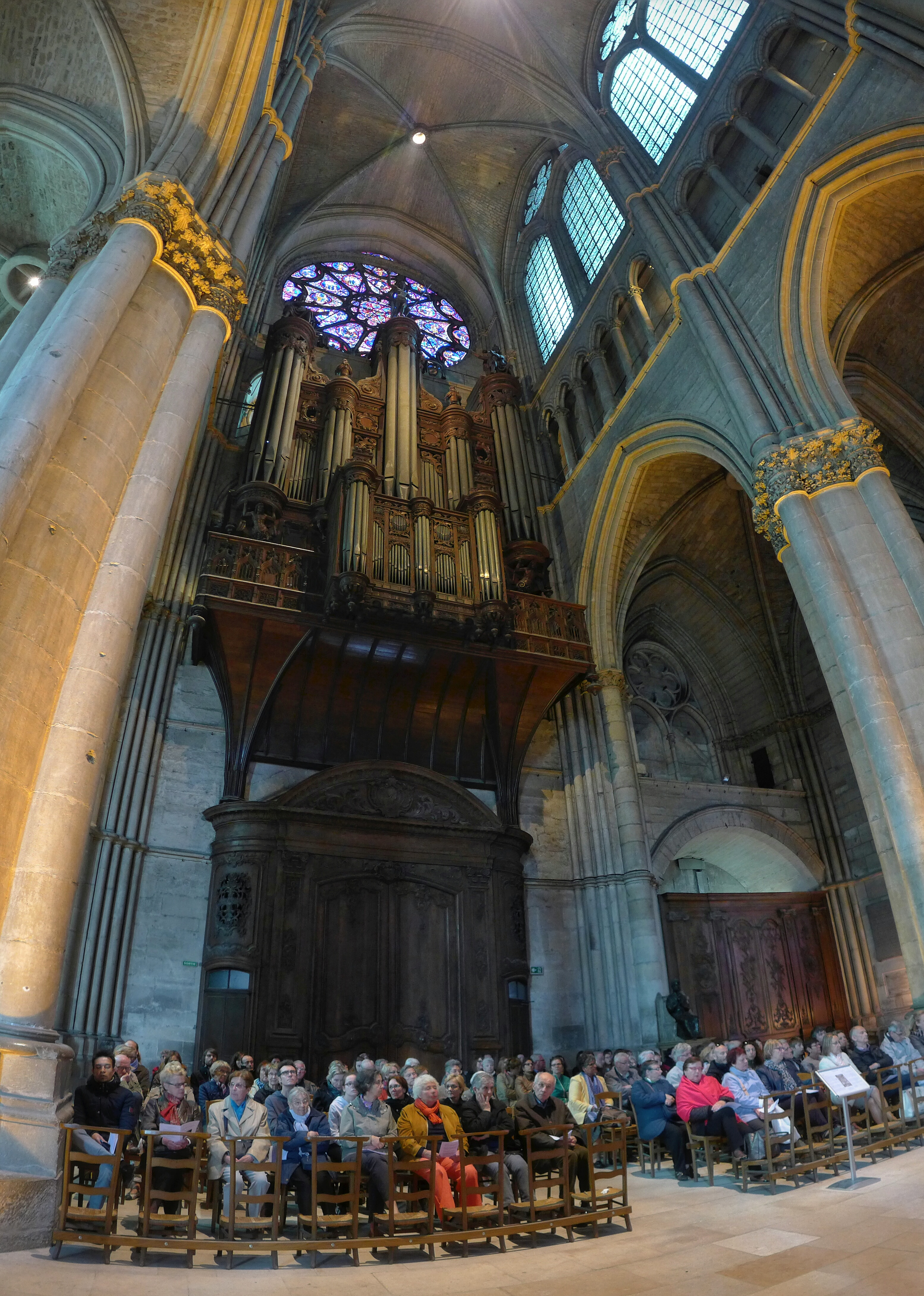
Organ

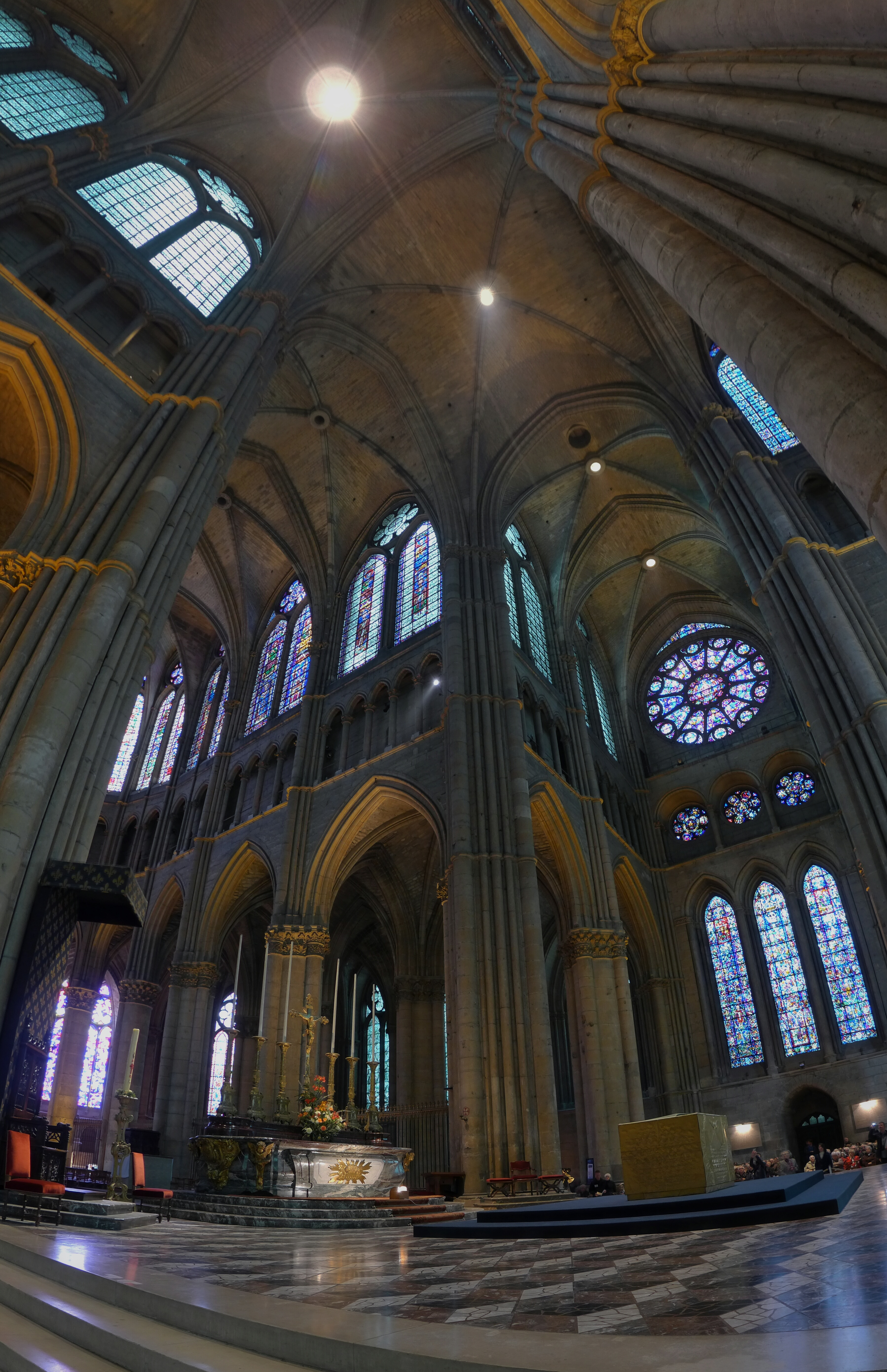
Central altar

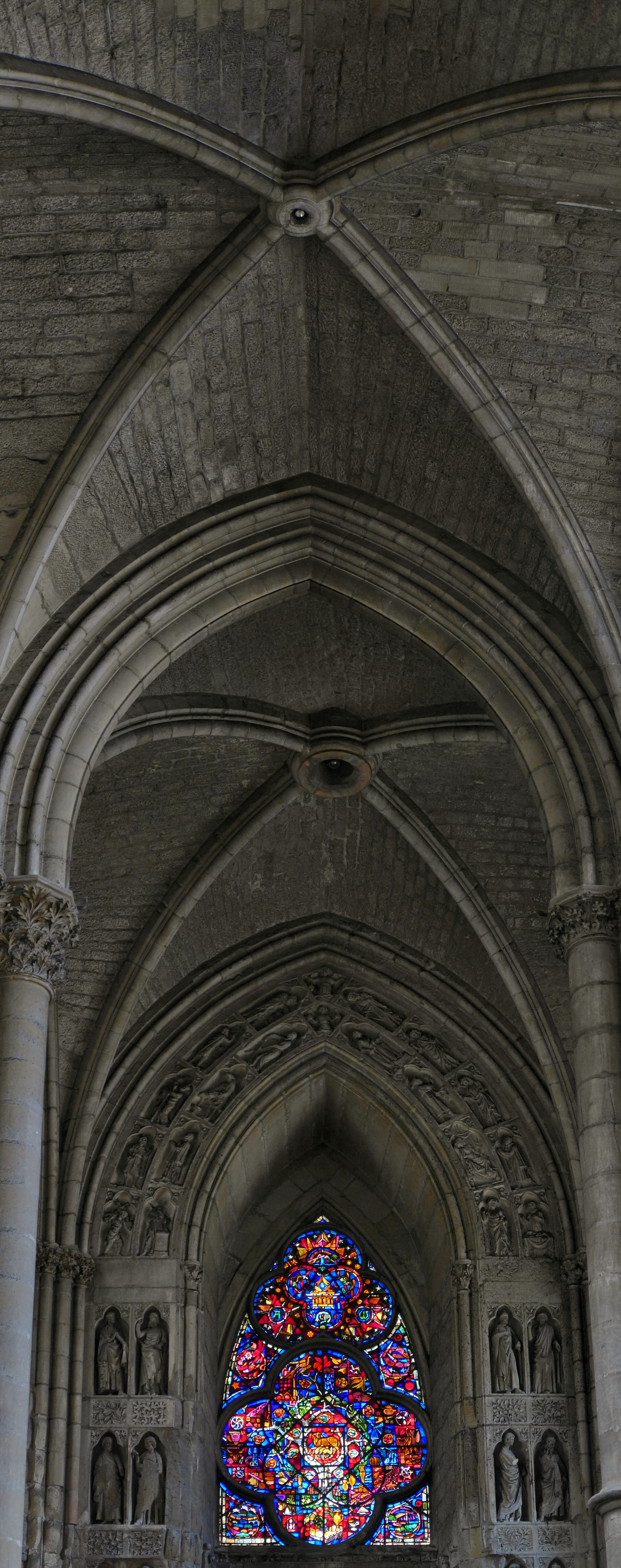
Stained-glass at the west end of the northern aisle

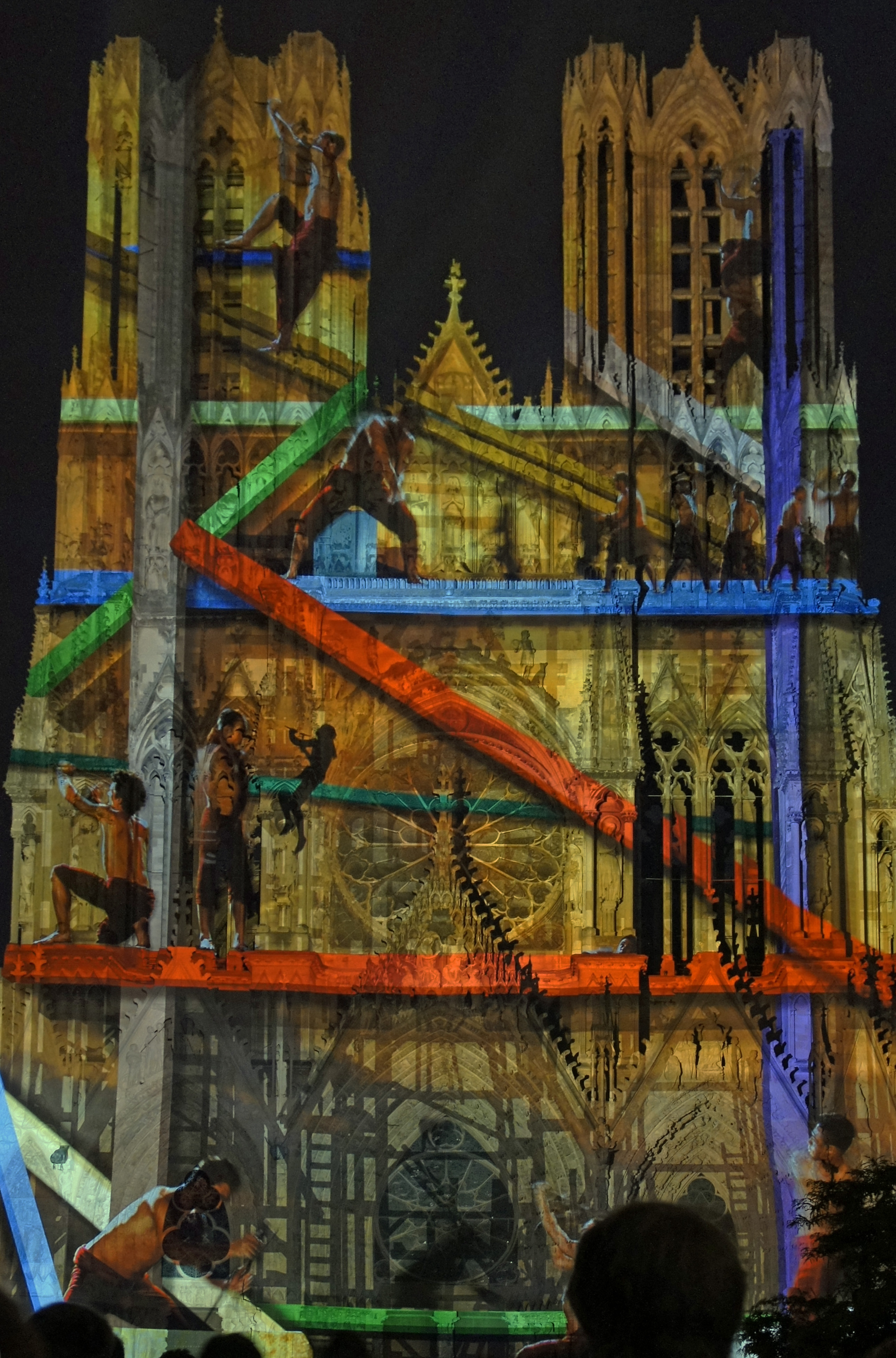
The Cathedral of Reims at night Rêve de couleurs

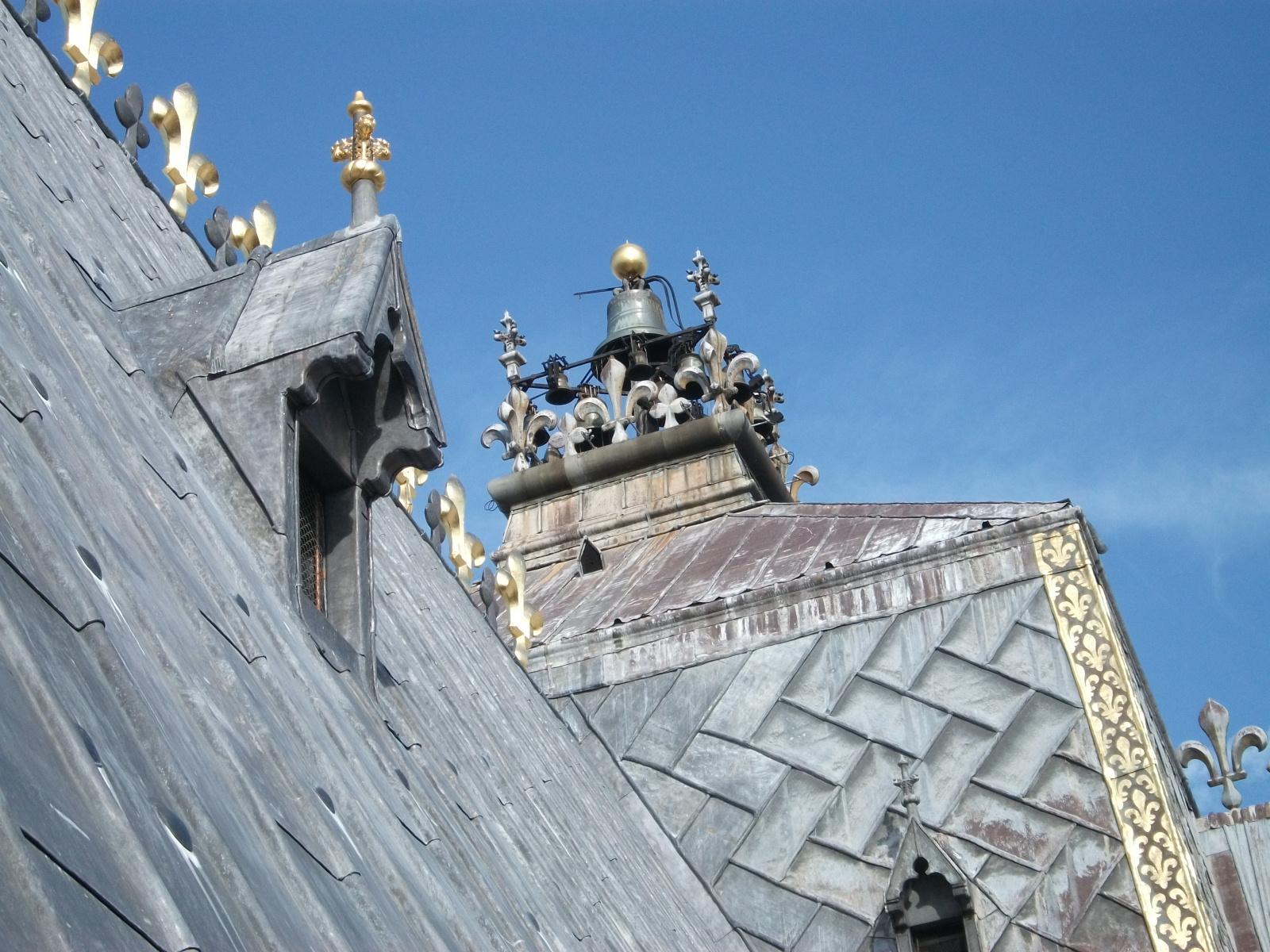
Roof details

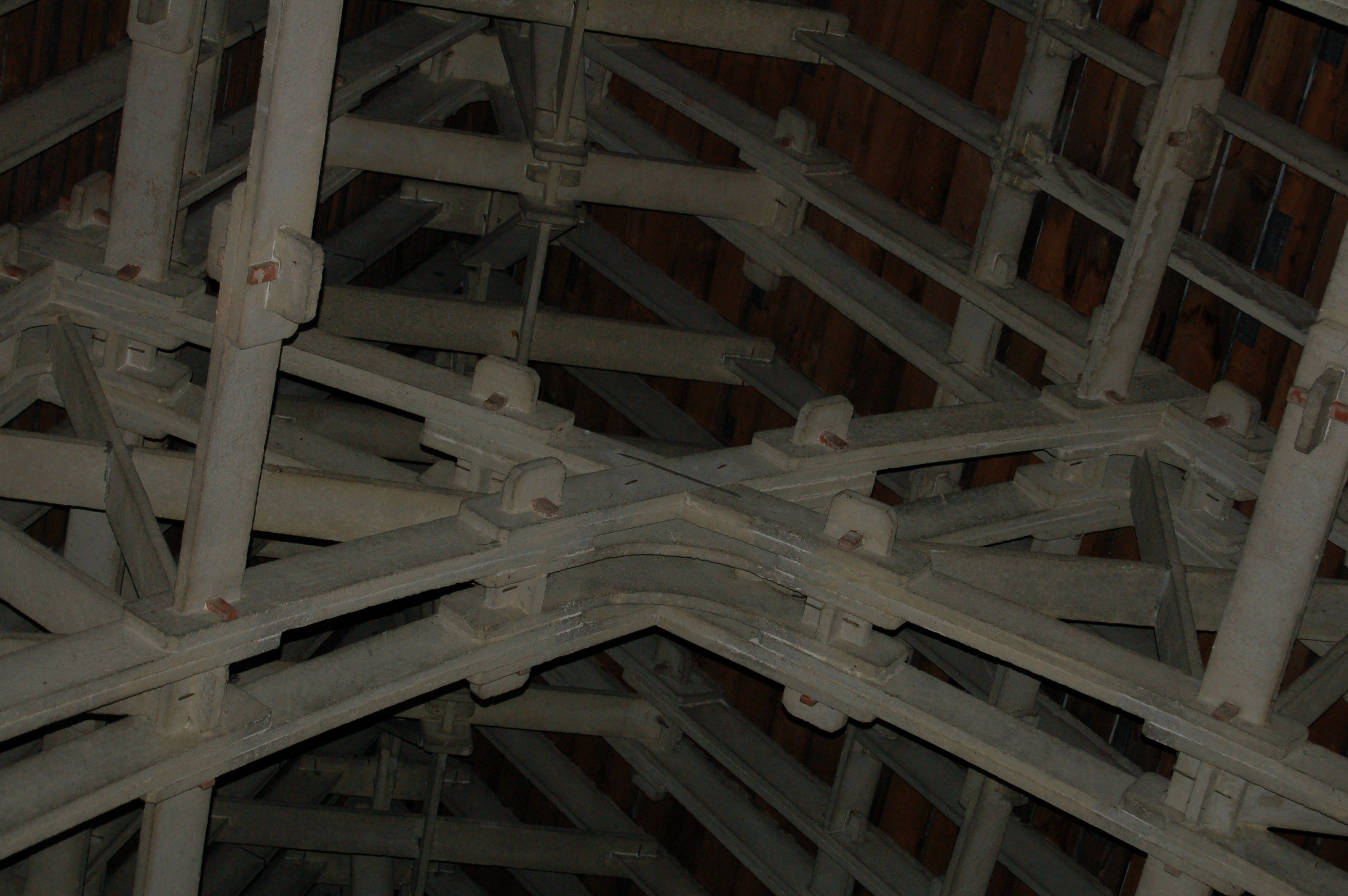
Support structure of the roof

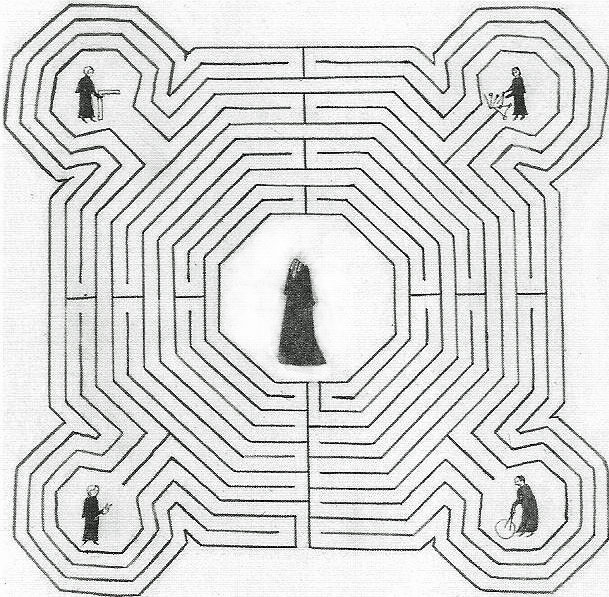
The labyrinth of the cathedral

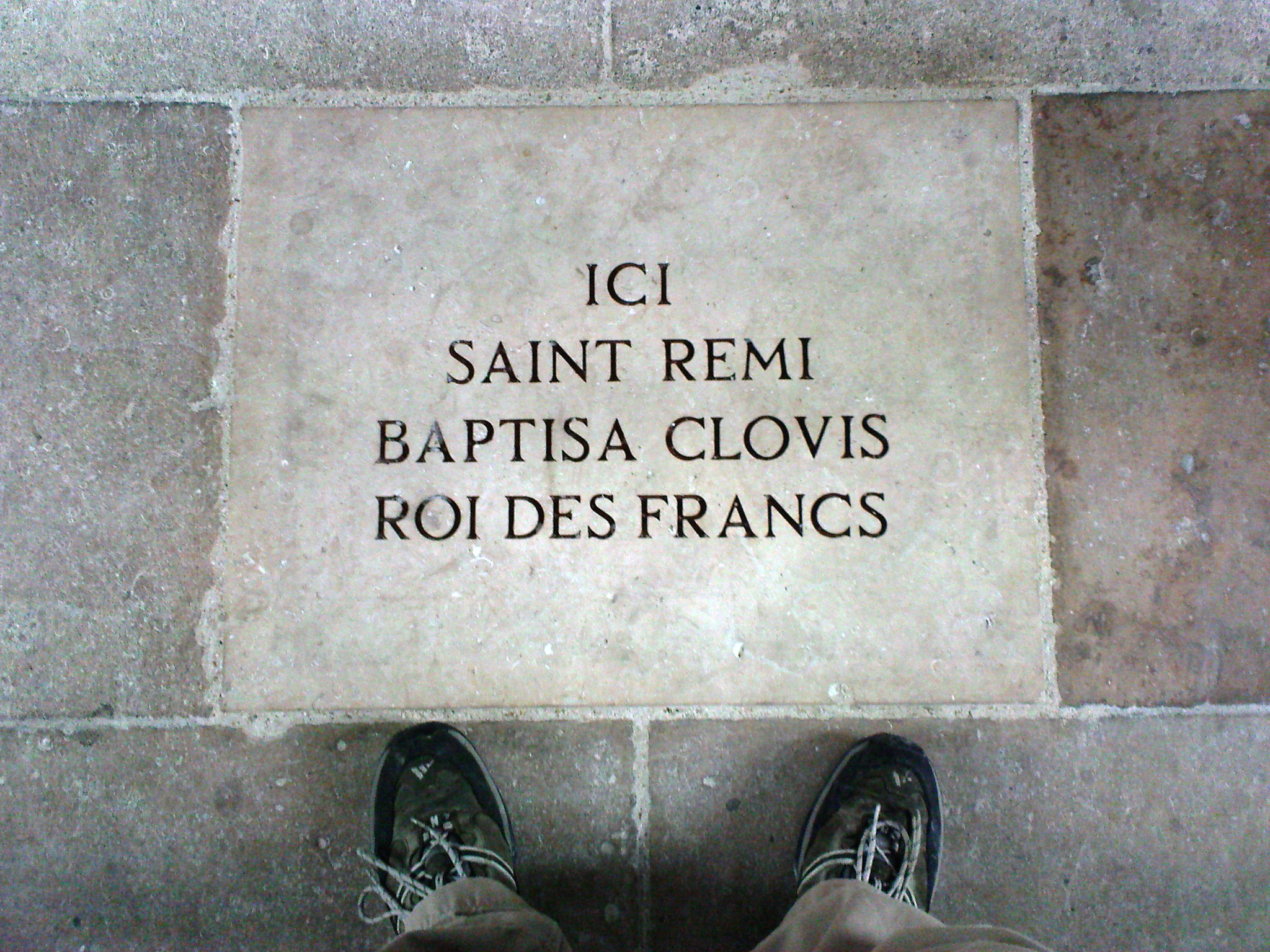
Paving stone in cathedral nave commemorating baptism of Clovis by Saint Remi

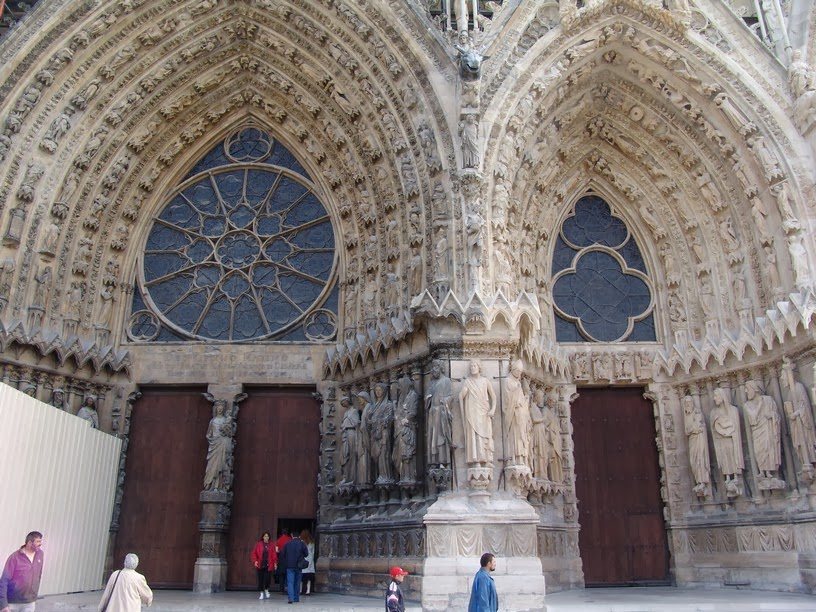
Main gate

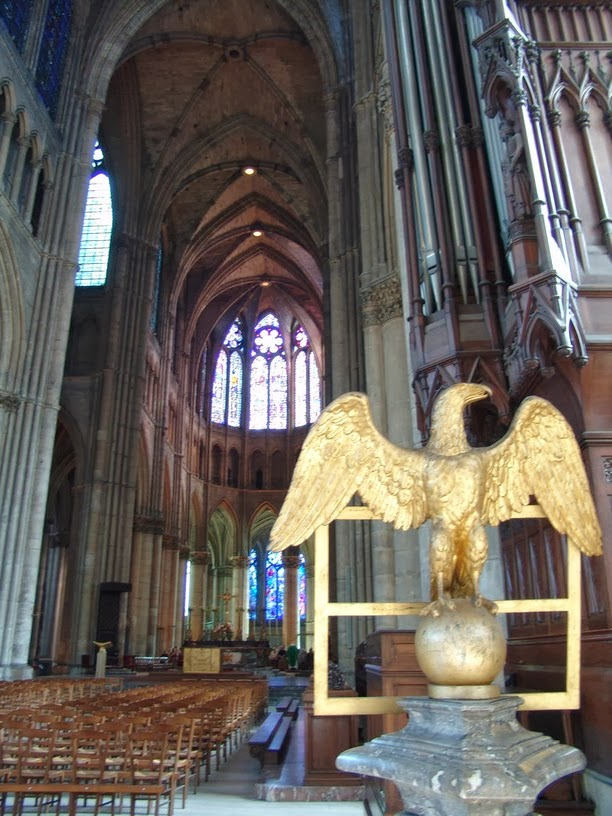
Golden eagle

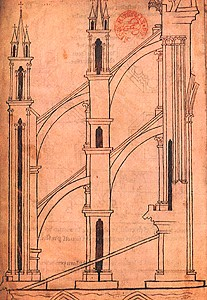
Villard de Honnecourt's drawing of a flying buttress at Reims, ca. 1230s (Bibliothèque nationale)

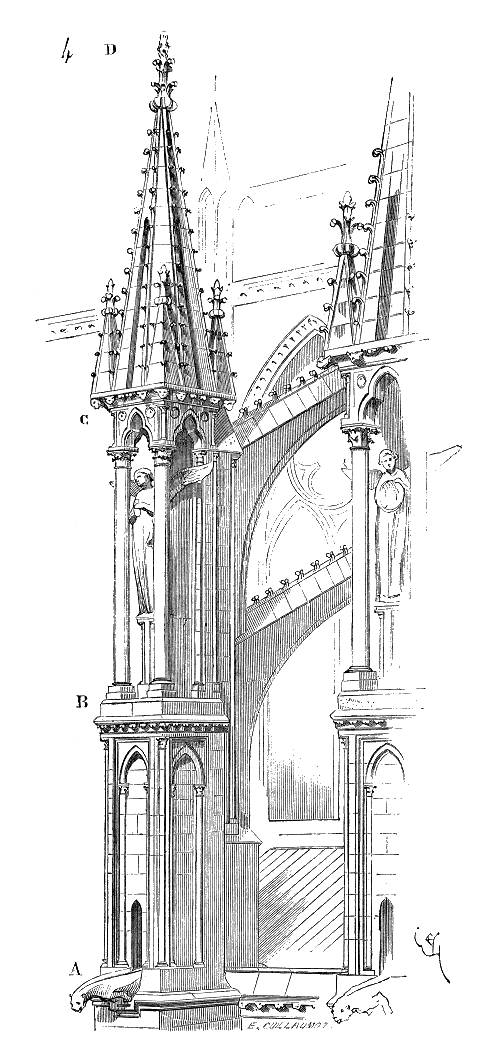
Flying buttress with pinnacle and a statue

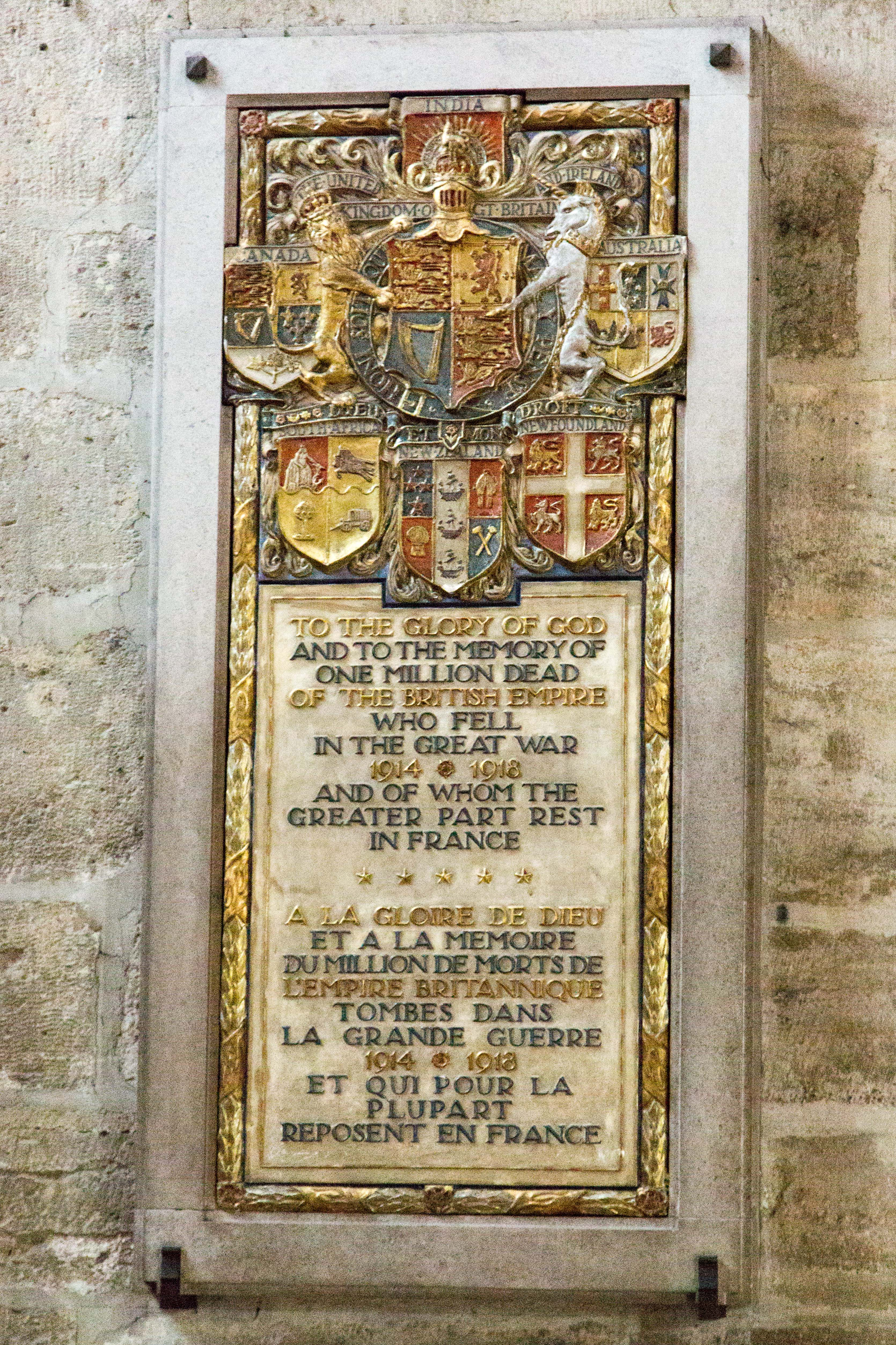
Marker in memory of World War I

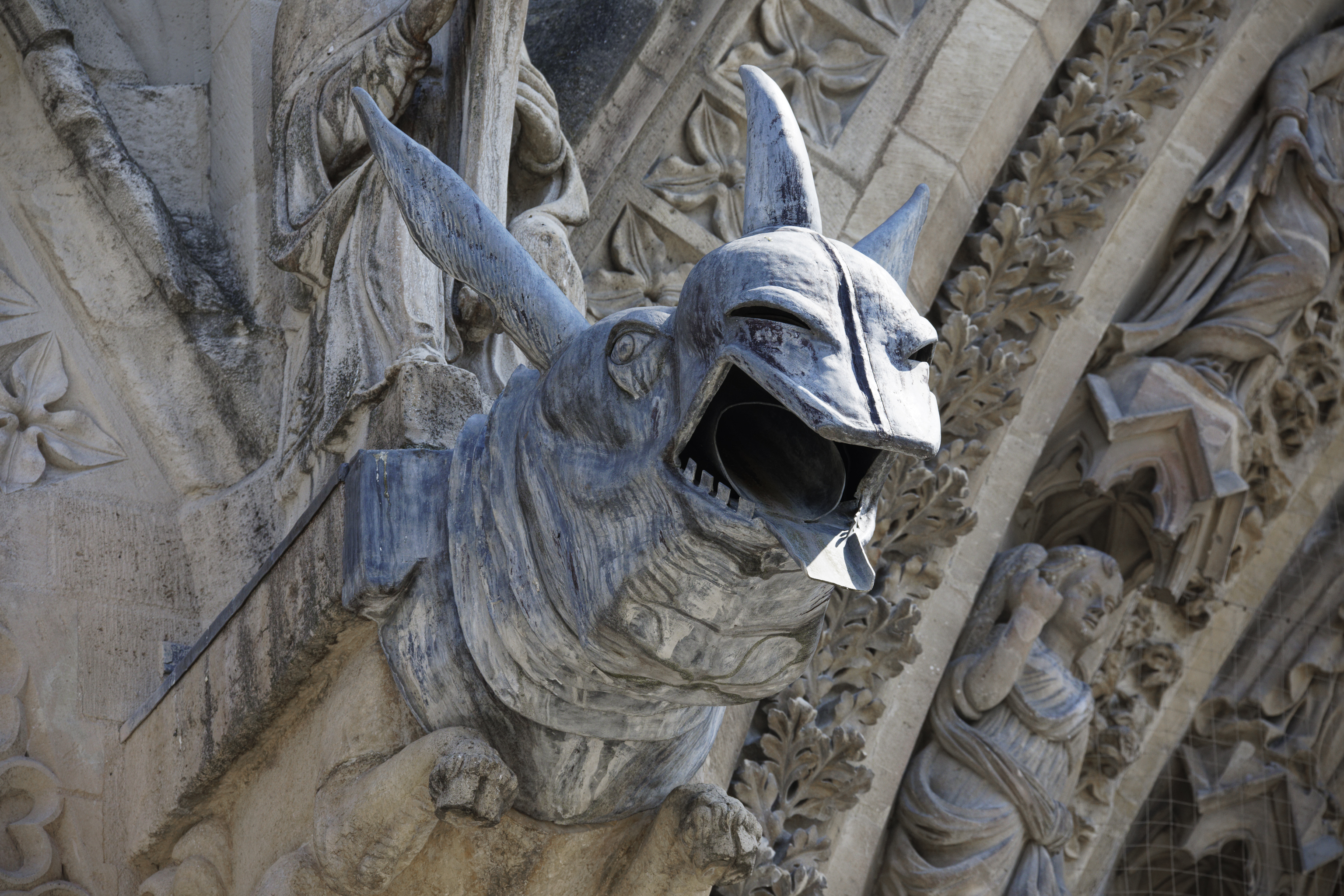
Gargoyle on the west façade

== See also ==
- High Gothic
- Gothic cathedrals and churches
- French Gothic architecture
- List of cathedrals in France
- List of highest church naves
- Roman Catholic Marian churches
- The Green Cathedral
- Coronation of the French monarch
- Sacred Heart Shrine, Idaikattur
