= Labyrinth of the Reims Cathedral =

Church labyrinth installed on the floor of the nave of the Cathedral of Reims

Coordinates: 49.2539°N 4.0339°E

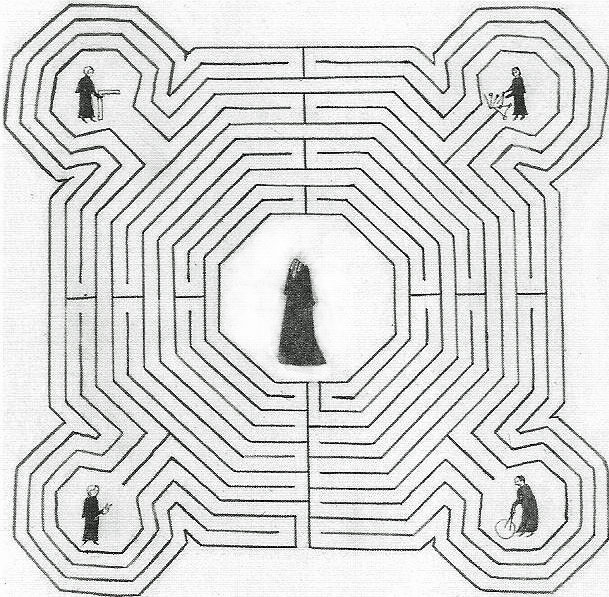
The labyrinth with its drawing of people.

The Labyrinth of Reims Cathedral was a church labyrinth installed on the floor of the nave of Reims Cathedral.

== Structure ==
The labyrinth was the shape of a complex square with cut corners and sides of 10.36 metres (11.33 yd) . The paths were 27.94 centimetres (11.00 in) wide, separated by lines of dark blue stone from Ardennes of a width of 11.43 centimetres (4.50 in). The labyrinth was made of soft stone that wore out beneath the feet of pilgrims. This stone was of the same kind as Pierre Libergier's tombstone that is now exhibited in the cathedral.

A distinctive aspect of the labyrinth was the inclusion within it of depictions of the master masons of the cathedral. In other churches and cathedrals, they are unknown and anonymous. Indeed, the identities of these master masons are precisely known, because a survey of the labyrinth was drawn in 1640 by Canon Cocquault and in 1779 (just before its destruction) by Robin and Havé. These surveys also contained dates and descriptions of the masons' works.

The person at the center of the labyrinth is generally identified as Aubry de Humbert, Archbishop of Reims, who decided in 1211 to build a new cathedral in the place of the one destroyed by fire in 1210.

The people in the corners of the labyrinth are successive master masons of the cathedral:

- (Top right) : Jean Orbais (1211-1231) made the plans of the cathedral and began the apse.
- (Top left) : Jean-le-Loup (1231-1247) began the northern portals.
- (Bottom left) : Gaucher de Reims (1247-1255) began the arches and portals on the western façade.
- (Bottom right) : Bernard de Soissons (1255-1290) made five vaults of the nave and the great rosace.

Bernard de Soissons was in charge during the inauguration of the labyrinth. There is no trace of the fifth (and probably best-known) contractor, Robert de Coucy, who was in charge from 1290 to 1311 and who oversaw the carpentry and the roof.

The masons are represented hard at work, with their tools in hand. For example, Jean d'Orbais appears to draw a map on the floor.

There were also two other silhouettes on each side of the entrance of the labyrinth; however, these could not be identified because they were already almost completely eroded.

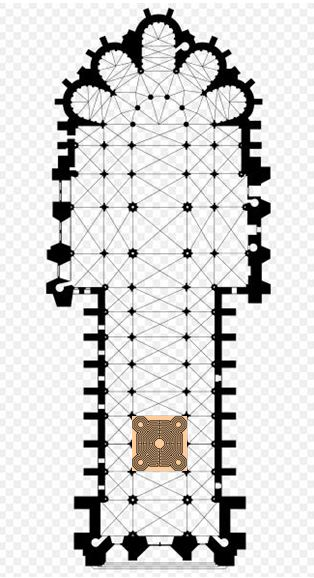
The labyrinth at its place in the nave.

== History ==
Church labyrinths made of colorful pavement represented Christ's resurrection at Calvary. Christian people walked them on their knees as a symbolic pilgrimage or to win indulgences.

The labyrinth was inaugurated at the coronation of Philippe le Bel on 6 January 1286. It covered the central part of the nave at the third and fourth spans.

The 500 year-old labyrinth was destroyed in 1779 by the canons of Reims cathedral, who had grown annoyed at people attempting to solve the labyrinth during their sermons.

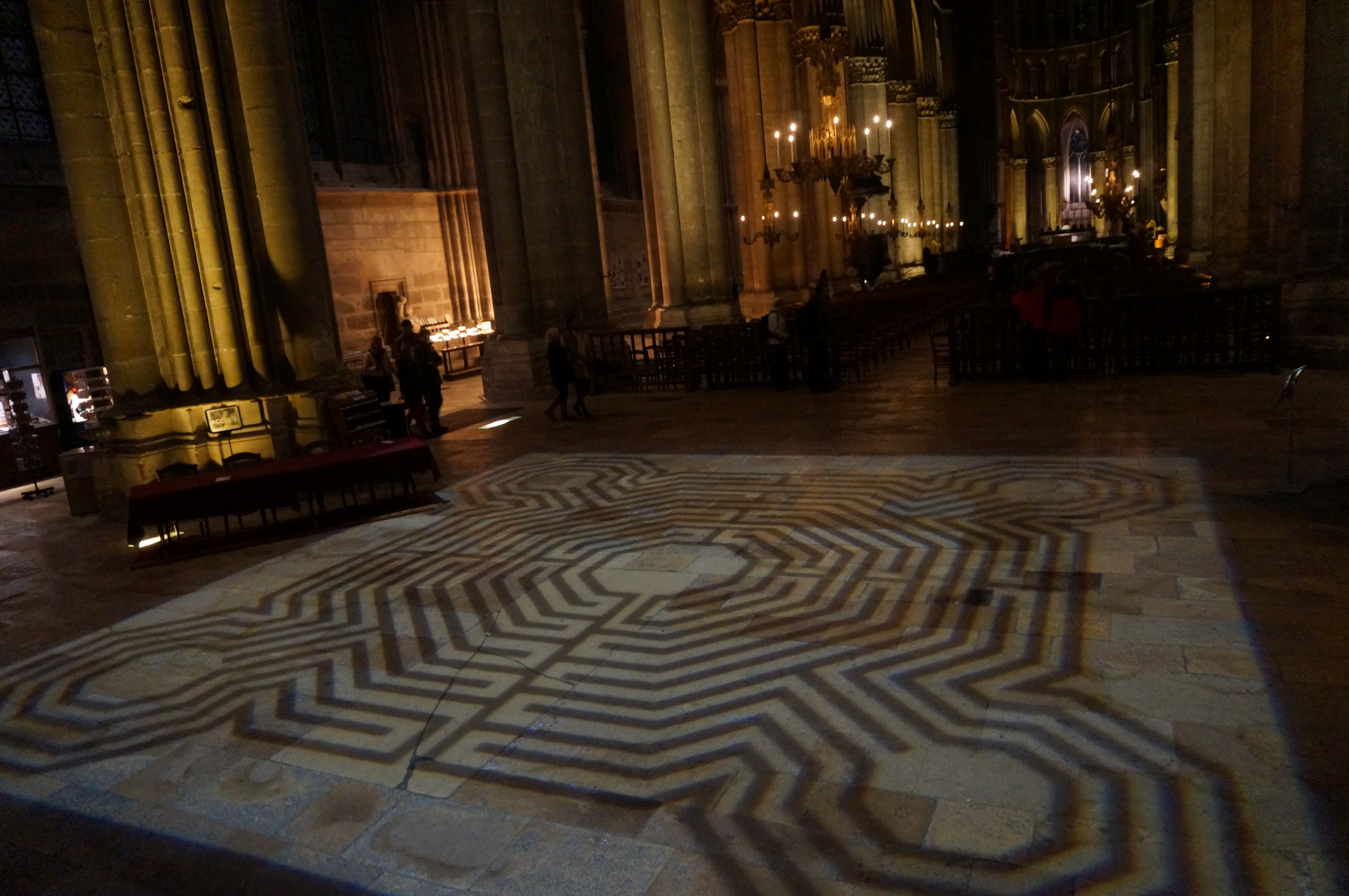
Projection of the labyrinth at its former place in the nave.

== Reconstruction project ==
A plan to rebuild the labyrinth ran into technical and administrative difficulties. Instead, a choice was made to undertake a reversible and non-destructive reconstruction. This took the form of a light projection on the ground that plays only in the evening, during cultural events. It was inaugurated on 19 September 2009.

== Cultural references ==
Umberto Eco chose the Reims labyrinth as the model for his own, featured in the 1980 novel, The Name of the Rose. In that book the outline of Reims labyrinth serves as the floorplan for a library.

The labyrinth has been chosen as the national logo for French historical monuments ("monuments historiques"). This logo depicts the labyrinth without people, rotated by 45°, and often in a dark red color.

Logo for French historical monuments

== Bibliography ==
- Naert, Dominique (1996). Le labyrinthe de la cathédrale de Reims [Labyrinth of the Reims Cathedral] (in French). 29 rue Gay- Lussac, 94120 Fontenay -sous -Bois: SIDES. p. 96. ISBN 978-2-86861-073-7.
