= Corbiac chapel =

Chapel in Pyrénées-Orientales, France

Coordinates: 42°39′35″N 2°21′50″E

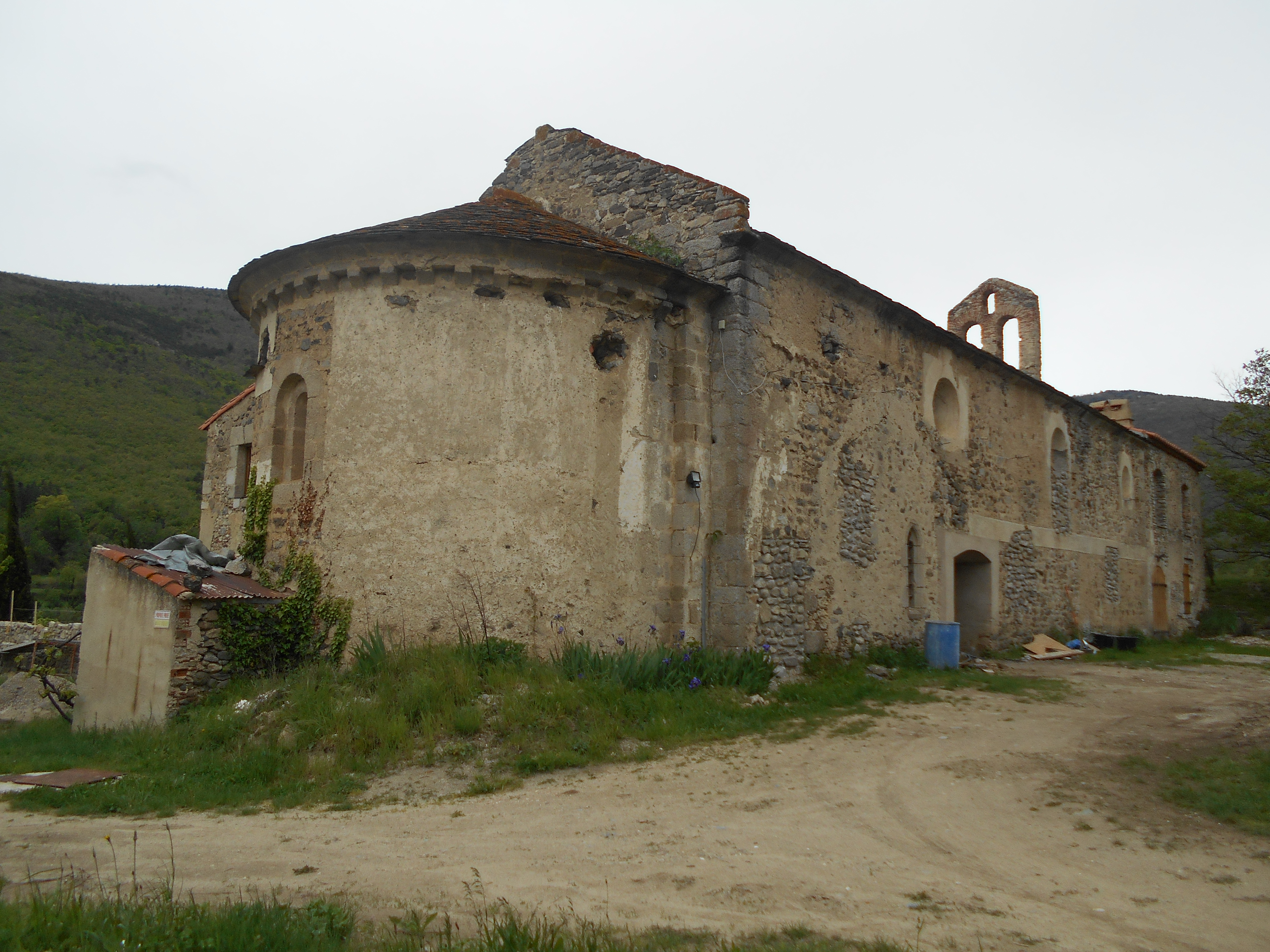
The chapel

Corbiac chapel is a historic chapel and former monastery located in the French Pyrenees in the département of Pyrénées-Orientales, between the villages of Molitg-les-Bains and Mosset in the Pyrenees.

Its Gothic chapel was built in the 13th century with a single nave and equipped with a gallery from the late 16th century, and an apse decorated with frescoes from the 17th. At the end of the 16th century, the Trinitarian Order founded a monastery here. Several objects originating from the chapel are now preserved in the church at Mosset.

In 1989, the buildings were bought by Rosemary Bailey, a British writer, and her partner. Their restoration of the property is described in Bailey's book, Life in a Postcard - Escape to the French Pyrenees. They sold the property in 2006.

In 2000, the chapel was listed as a monument historique by the French Ministry of Culture. It is privately owned.
