= Lavatory Madeleine =

Public toilet and heritage site in France

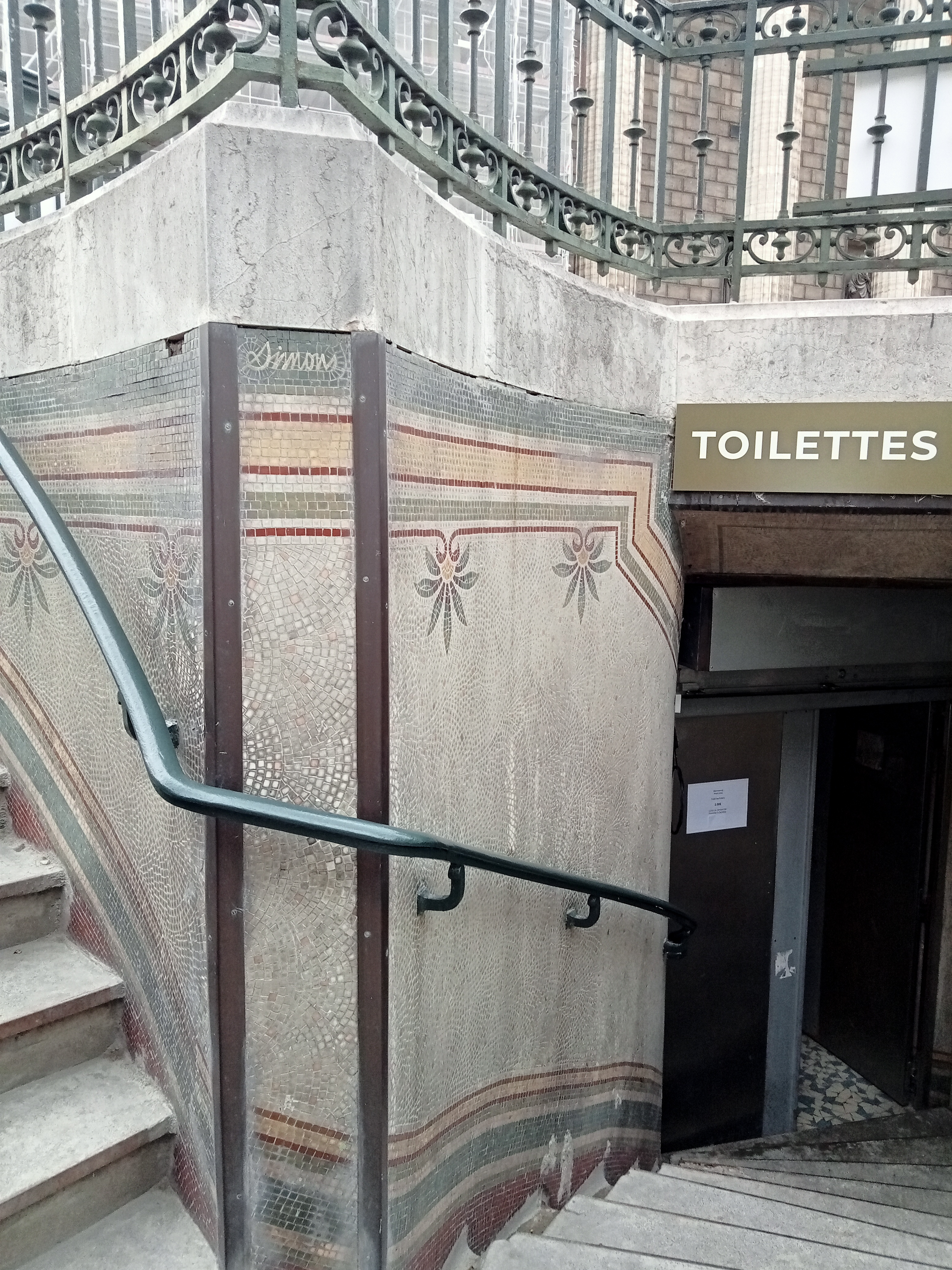
- Entrance to the Lavatory Madeleine, 2023
- Interactive map of Lavatory Madeleine
- 48°52′11″N 02°19′29″E
- Type: Public toilet
- Etymology: La Madeleine, Paris
- Location: Place de la Madeleine, 8th arrondissement of Paris, France

History
- Built: 1905; 121 years ago
- Built for: Établissements Porcher

Site notes
- Architectural style: Art Nouveau
- Restored: 1989‍–‍1990, 2022‍–‍2023
- Owner: City of Paris

Monument historique
- Type: Inscribed
- Designated: 16 March 2011
- Reference no.: PA75080008 (Mérimée)

The Lavatory Madeleine is a public toilet on Place de la Madeleine (next to La Madeleine) in the 8th arrondissement of Paris, France. It was built in 1905 to showcase a new type of underground public toilet. It was the first of its kind in France, and the most luxurious. Inspiration came from London, where underground public toilets had existed since 1889. Lavatory Madeleine was lavishly decorated in the Art Nouveau style, and equipped with a range of toilet options in different price classes.

Some modifications were made in the 1930s and 1950s, and notably in the 1980s when the men's section was closed and transformed into a service area for telecommunications. A restoration was carried out in 1989–1990. The establishment was closed to the public in 2011. Persistent problems with water leaks in the ceiling prompted a complete restoration in 2022–2023, with the aim of restoring the public toilet to its former appearance. It is run today by an association, and visitors can use the lavatory for a fee. It is a designated monument historique (national heritage site).

== Background ==
Towards the end of the 19th century, the increased use of cars and the proliferation of street furniture caused Parisian officials seek an alternative to public toilets that took up surface area. The idea to build underground facilities originated in London, where such facilities had been constructed in busy areas such as Wellington Street, Trafalgar Square and Piccadilly Circus starting in 1889. In 1891, the Parisian municipal administration initiated a study for an "underground gallery of necessity". In 1899, a report recommended the construction of underground public toilets at four locations: Place de la Bastille, Boulevard de Strasbourg, Place du Théâtre-Français (the present-day Place André-Malraux), and Place de la Madeleine. The first facility put into operation was the one at Place de la Madeleine, the Lavatory Madeleine.

The number of public underground toilets continued to rise steadily in Paris through the 20th century; in 1974, there were 168 toilets. While the first generation of public toilets were decorated in the Art Nouveau style, and those built during the 1920s were embellished with Art Deco elements, subsequent public toilet facilities in Paris have tended to be more simply decorated, presumably for economic reasons.

== Original layout ==
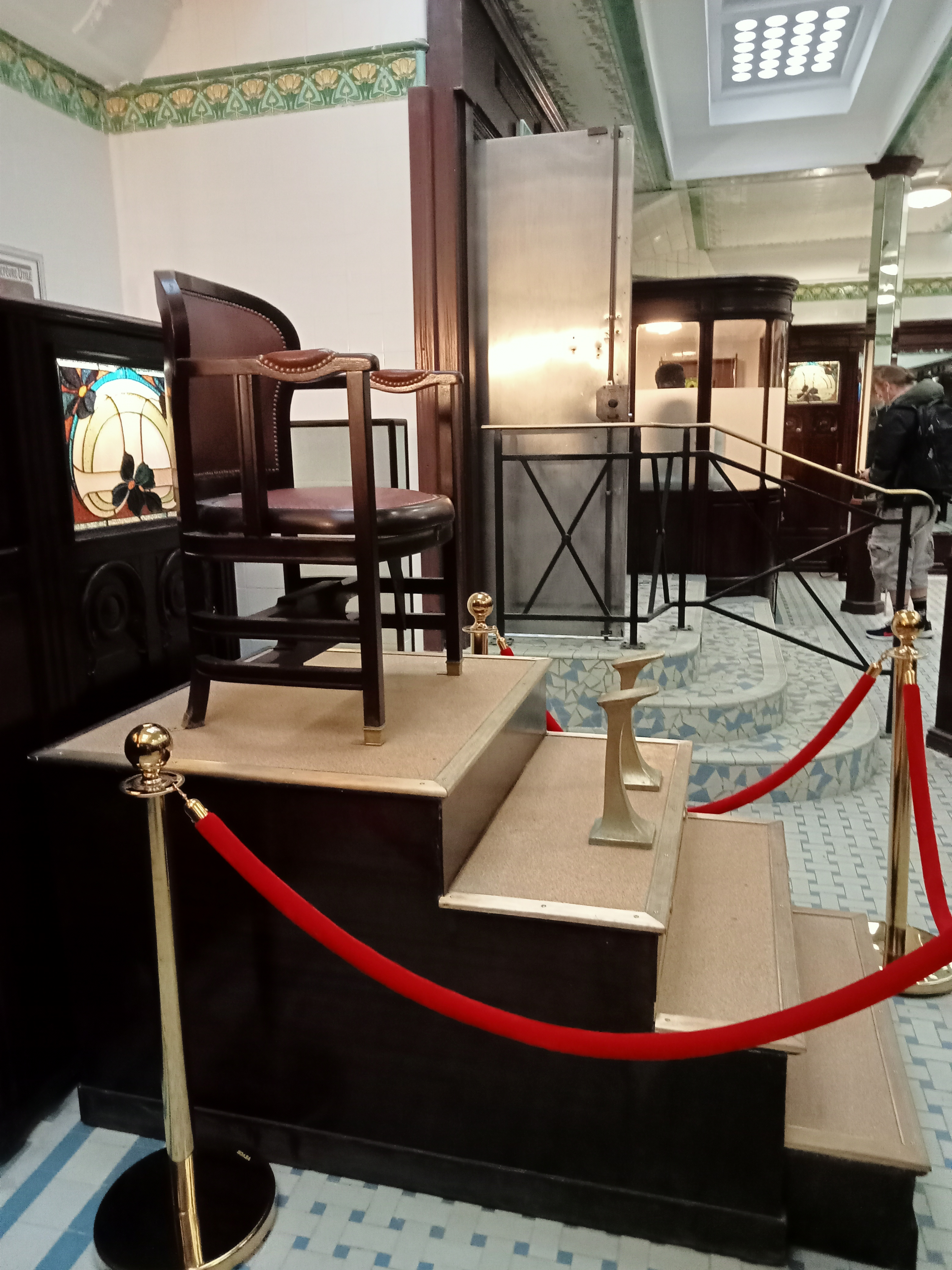
Shoeshiner's chair in the Lavatory Madeleine

The Lavatory Madeleine was the first underground public toilet in France, and the most luxurious of those built. The task of construction was granted to the company Établissements Porcher, established in 1886 and specializing in manufacturing bathroom and sanitary equipment. The company employed a cabinetmaker, a master glassmaker, and a mirror maker to handle the details. Mahogany panelling, decorated ceramic tiles, glazed bricks, mosaic, and decorated stained-glass windows were all installed. In addition, the toilets were equipped with modern facilities such as electrical lighting, hydraulic fans, ventilation, and concrete covered with waterproof coating. The original plans included several levels of luxury in different price categories, for both men and women. On the men's side, there were three "luxury toilets" with hot water sinks, but also 22 stall urinals. On the women's side, the toilets ranged in price from free, at the lower end, up to four luxury toilets equipped with bidets and private sinks, which were available at a cost of 20 centimes. The establishment also housed a custodian's office and, in the part reserved for men, a chair and space for shoe shiners.

The reasons for the lavish decoration were partly commercial: Établissements Porcher owned exhibition rooms nearby, and the lavatory was built to showcase the model, in hopes that it would lead to the creation of many more.

== Subsequent changes and restoration ==
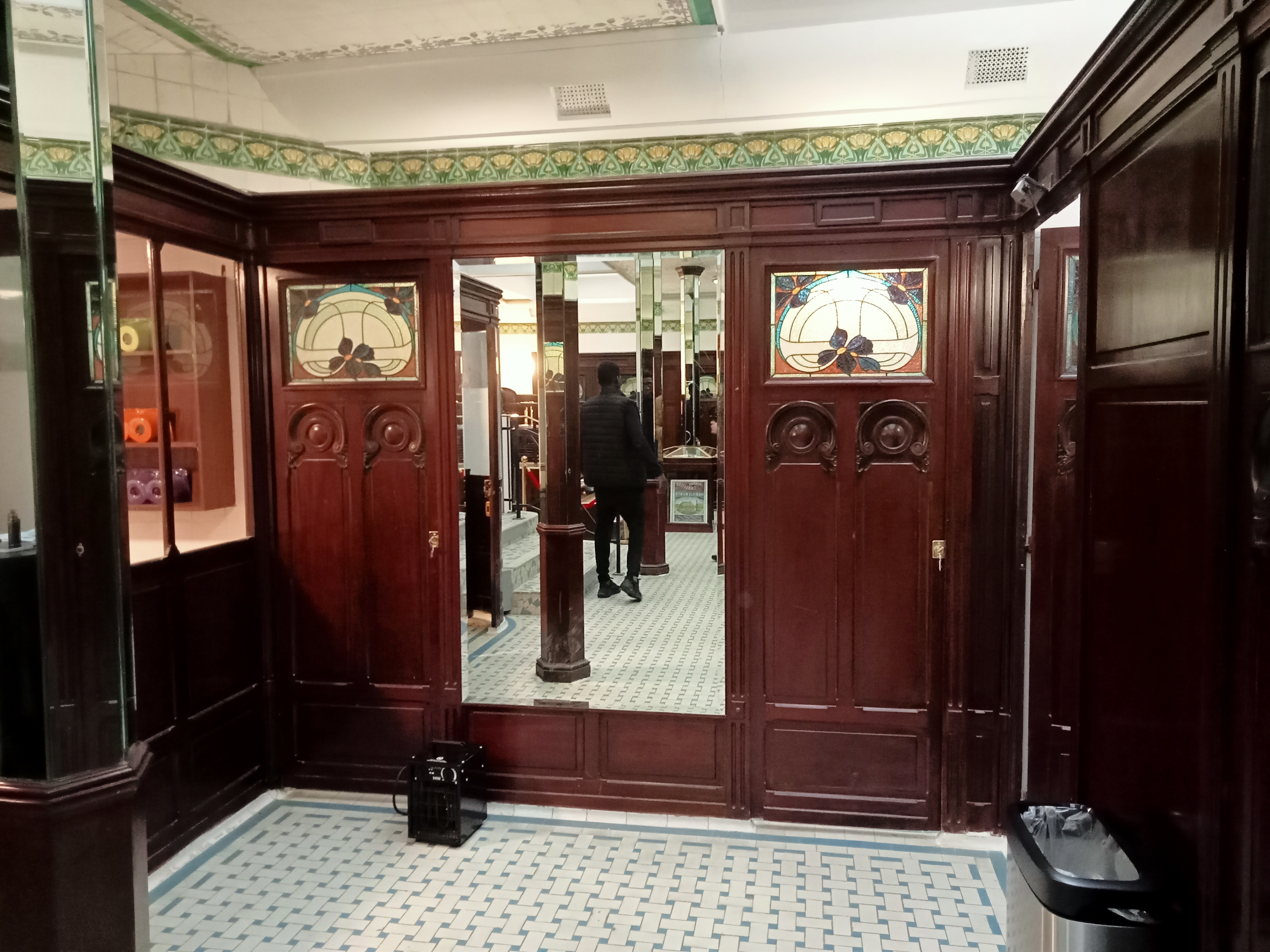
Part of the interior, after the restoration in 2022–2023

Recurring problems with water penetrating the ceiling led to modifications in 1937 and again in 1950. As early as 1984, the Chief Architect of Historic Monuments drew attention to the "picturesque interest" of the place and the benefits of preserving it. A major change was made in 1987, when the men's side was closed and redeveloped into a service area for telecommunications. The telecommunications equipment has remained; subsequent changes have only affected the former women's area. A partial restoration was carried out in 1989–1990, when many of the Art Nouveau features were returned, both inside and outside. Some modern elements were also introduced, such as turnstiles and hand dryers, and much of the older equipment was replaced with modern equipment. In 2011, the facility was closed to the public and designated a monument historique (national heritage site). Water leaking through the ceiling again led to further deterioration. A restoration was therefore carried out in 2022–2023, with the aim of returning the public toilet to its original appearance. The establishment is run by an association, and there is a €2 charge to use the facilities. Visiting without using the facilities is free.

== Sources cited ==
- Simon, Miriam (2023). "Une histoire des lieux d'aisances publics à Paris : Le cas du lavatory de la place de la Madeleine". In situ. Revue des patrimoines (in French) (51). French Ministry of Culture. doi:10.4000/insitu.39269. ISSN 1630-7305.
