= Jean d'Orbais =

French architect

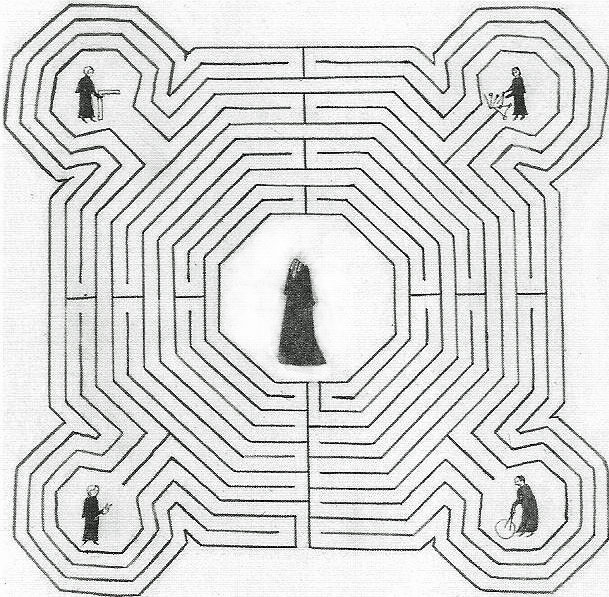
Orbais shown top right of the labyrinth

Jean d'Orbais (French pronunciation: [ʒɑ̃ dɔʁbɛ]; ca. 1175–1231) was a French architect from Orbais-l'Abbaye, active in the Reims area. He was an architect of the High Gothic style and the first of the four architects of the Cathedral of Reims, where he is depicted in the labyrinth mosaic in the nave. He was responsible for the design of and initial work on the cathedral of Notre Dame de Reims.

== Early life ==
He was born c. 1175 in the village of Orbais in the and before working at Reims he made his debut with the construction of the Abbey Church of Orbais.

== Abbey ==
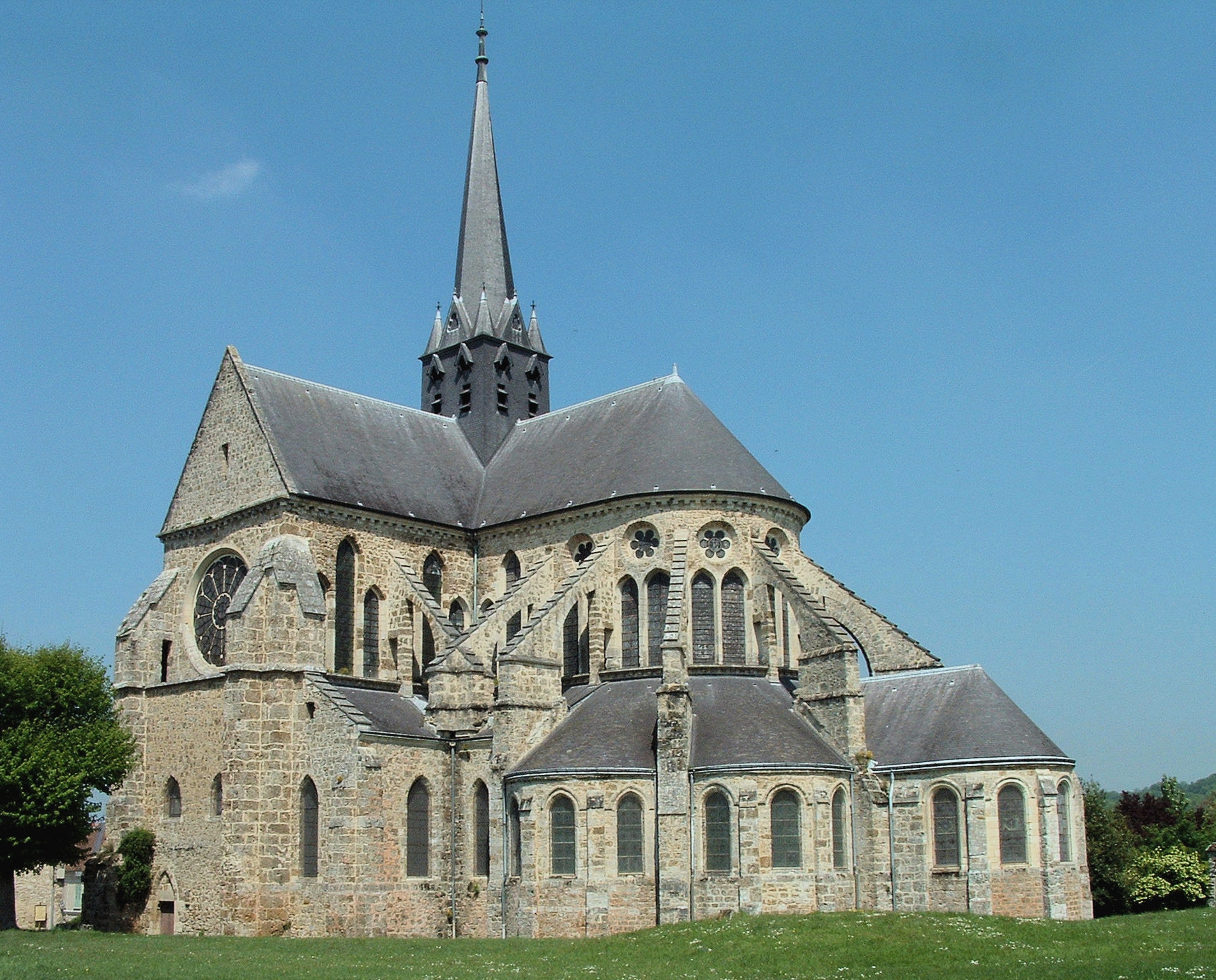
Abbey church Orbais-l'Abbaye.

The St. Pierre-St. Paul Church was built at the end of the 12th and early 13th centuries by Jean of Orbais, one of the architects of the Cathedral of Reims.

The Abbey Church had a length of 8 m with eight bays of nave, Two of which remain today. The architecture is superb and particularly the façade, with its two towers similar to those of the Basilica Saint-Rémi de Reims and the choir with ambulatory with five radiating chapels. There is also stained glass windows of the 12th century, funerary slabs from the 14th and 15th centuries, a baptismal font from the 16th century and the glazed tiles from the 15th century.

== Cathedral of Reims ==
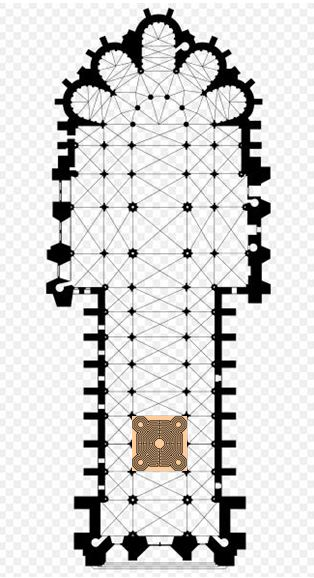
Cathedral plan showing labyrinth location in the nave

He saw the design and beginning of construction of the Cathedral of Notre-Dame, Reims, on which he worked from 1211 AD to 1231 AD and 1235. The design was carried out in ca. 1210; among its new features were three-tier elevation, and quadripartite vaults.

The overall plan of the cathedral was his and he oversaw the first stone was laid on May 6, 1211 AD, and at the time he was unaware of the cathedrals of Laon, Soissons or Chartres, which his successors would go on to emulate.

Jean of Orbais began the construction of the cathedral from the side by the apse, the southern pan of the transept and the choir, followed by much of the nave, until the fourth span and high walls of the aisles were completed with their windows.

He was replaced as architect in 1228 by Jean-Le-Loup. It is not known why he ceased to work towards 1228 AD, although it is thought he was dismissed due to conflict with the newly appointed Archbishop Henri de Braisne.

He died in 1231 in Reims.

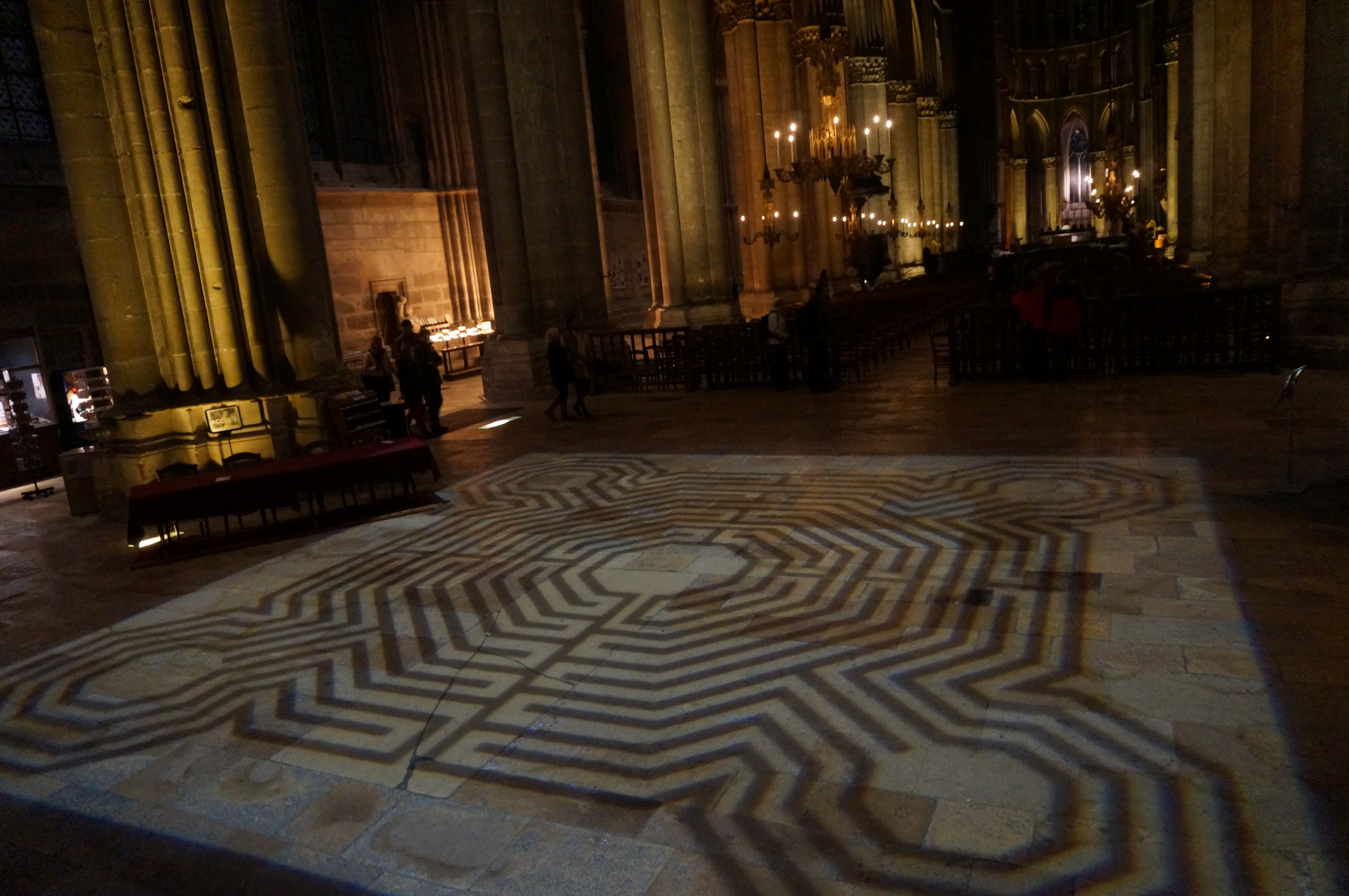
Reims Cathedral nave

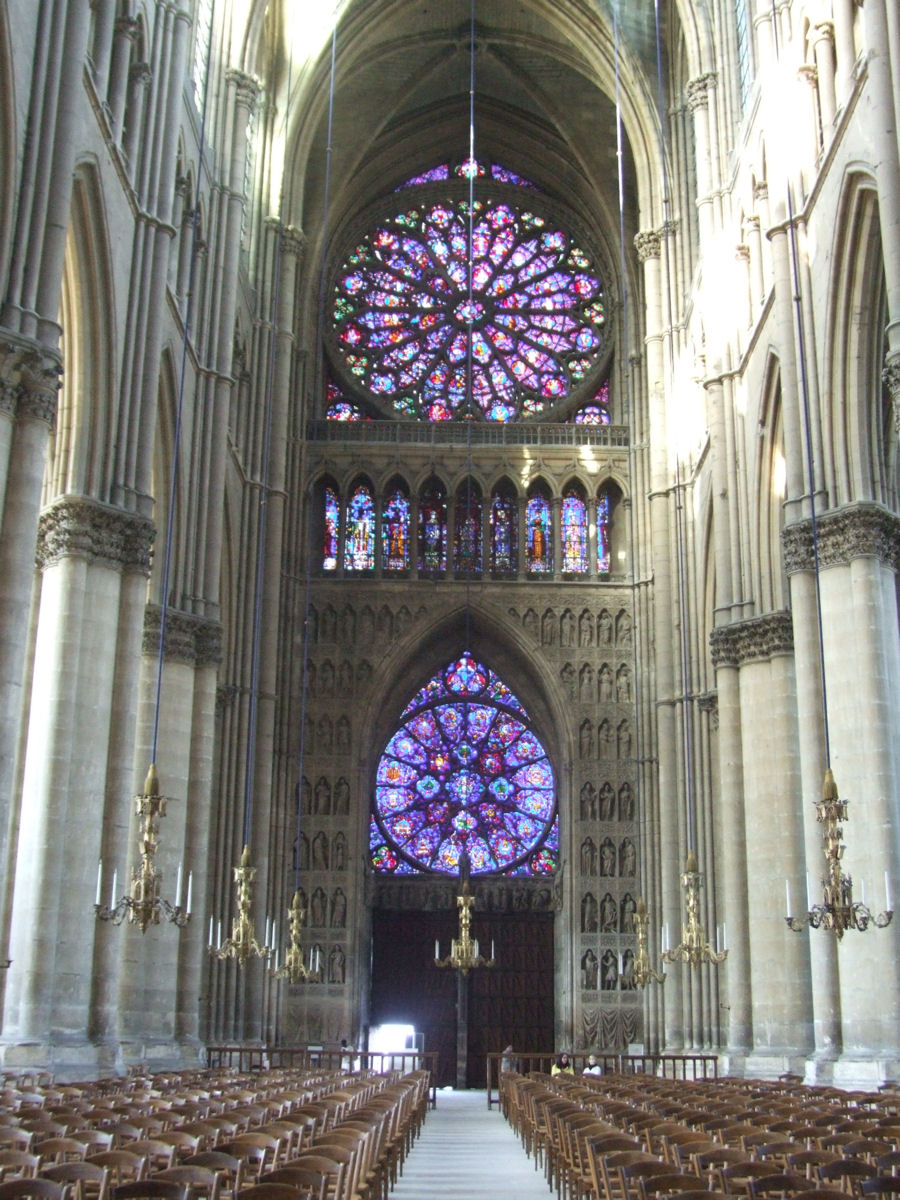
Two rose windows on the cathedral's west end
