= Orbais-l'Abbaye =

- Commune
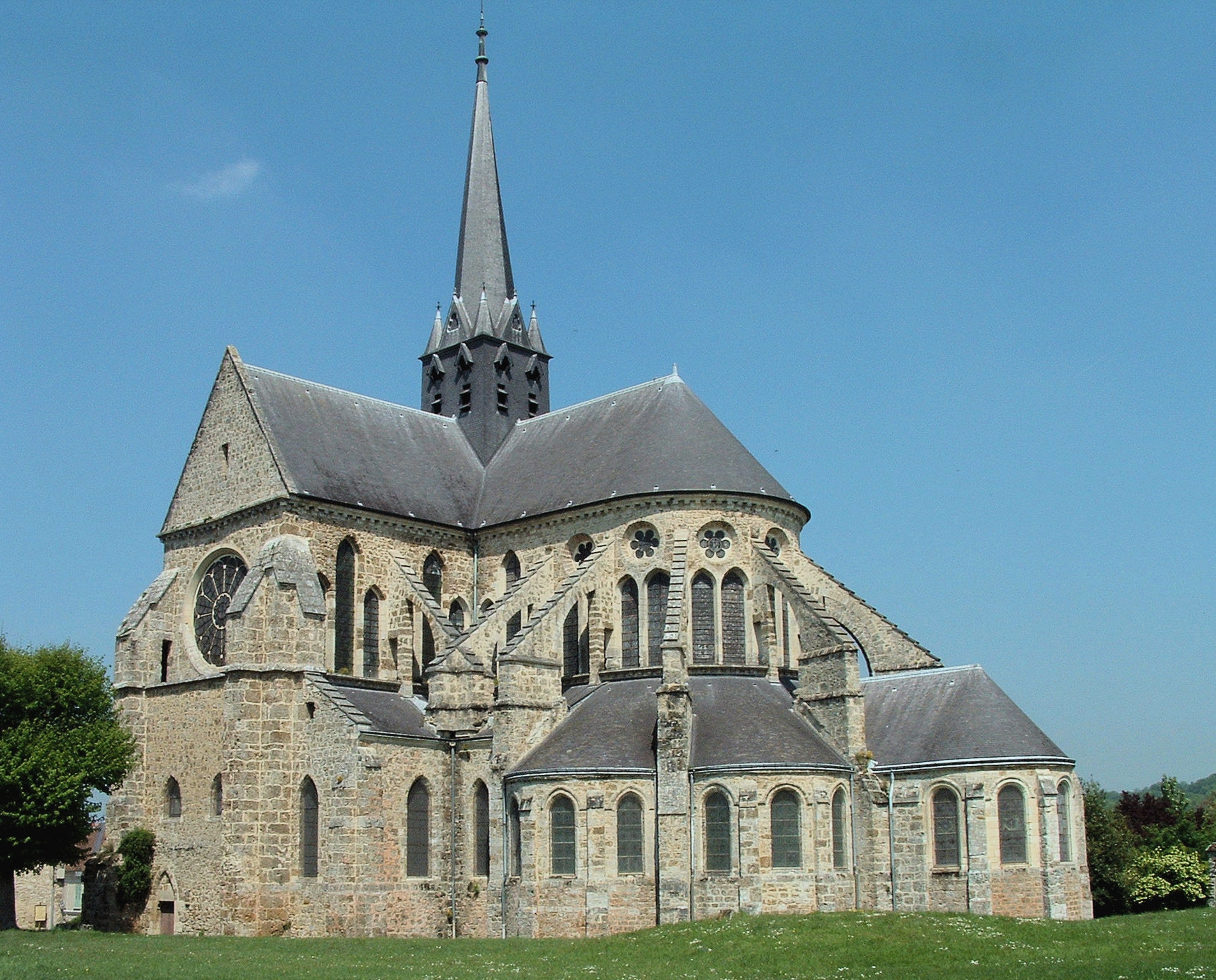
- The abbey in Orbais-l'Abbaye

- Coat of arms
- Location of Orbais-l'Abbaye
- Location within France Location within Grand Est
- Coordinates: 48°57′03″N 3°41′58″E
- Country: France
- Region: Grand Est
- Department: Marne
- Arrondissement: Épernay
- Canton: Dormans-Paysages de Champagne
- Intercommunality: Paysages de la Champagne

Government
  - Mayor (2023–2026): Alexandre Piat
- Area^{1}: 16.03 km^{2} (6.19 sq mi)
- Elevation: 149 m (489 ft)
- Population (2023): 505
  - Density: 31.5/km^{2} (81.6/sq mi)
- Time zone: UTC+01:00 (CET)
  - Summer (DST): UTC+02:00 (CEST)
- INSEE/Postal code: 51416 /51270
- ^{1} French Land Register data, which excludes lakes, ponds, glaciers > 1 km^{2} (0.386 sq mi or 247 acres) and river estuaries.

Orbais-l'Abbaye (French pronunciation: [ɔʁbɛ labei], before 1988: Orbais) is a commune in the Marne department in north-eastern France. The abbey at Orbais was founded at the end of the 7th century by Saint Réol, and the remains (including a church) are situated in the centre of the town.

== History ==
Founded at the end of the 7th century by Saint Réol, 26th Bishop of Reims, the benedictine Abbey is located in the Surmelin valley. Of the first monks who settled in Orbais, six came from the monastery of Rebais and followed the rule of saint Benedict.

The St. Pierre-St. Paul Church was built at the end of the 12th century and early 13th century.

René de Rieux was commendatory abbot of Orbais between 1626 and 1651 and was also abbot of the Abbeys of Notre-Dame de Daoulas and Relec, as well as Bishop of León.

During World War I, the French 5th Army established its campaign headquarters in the castle on 3 September 1914.

== Population ==
At the revolution the population was about 850, between about 1835 and 1870 the population was about 1000 people and then began to decline. The population is 561 as of 2017.

== Landmarks ==
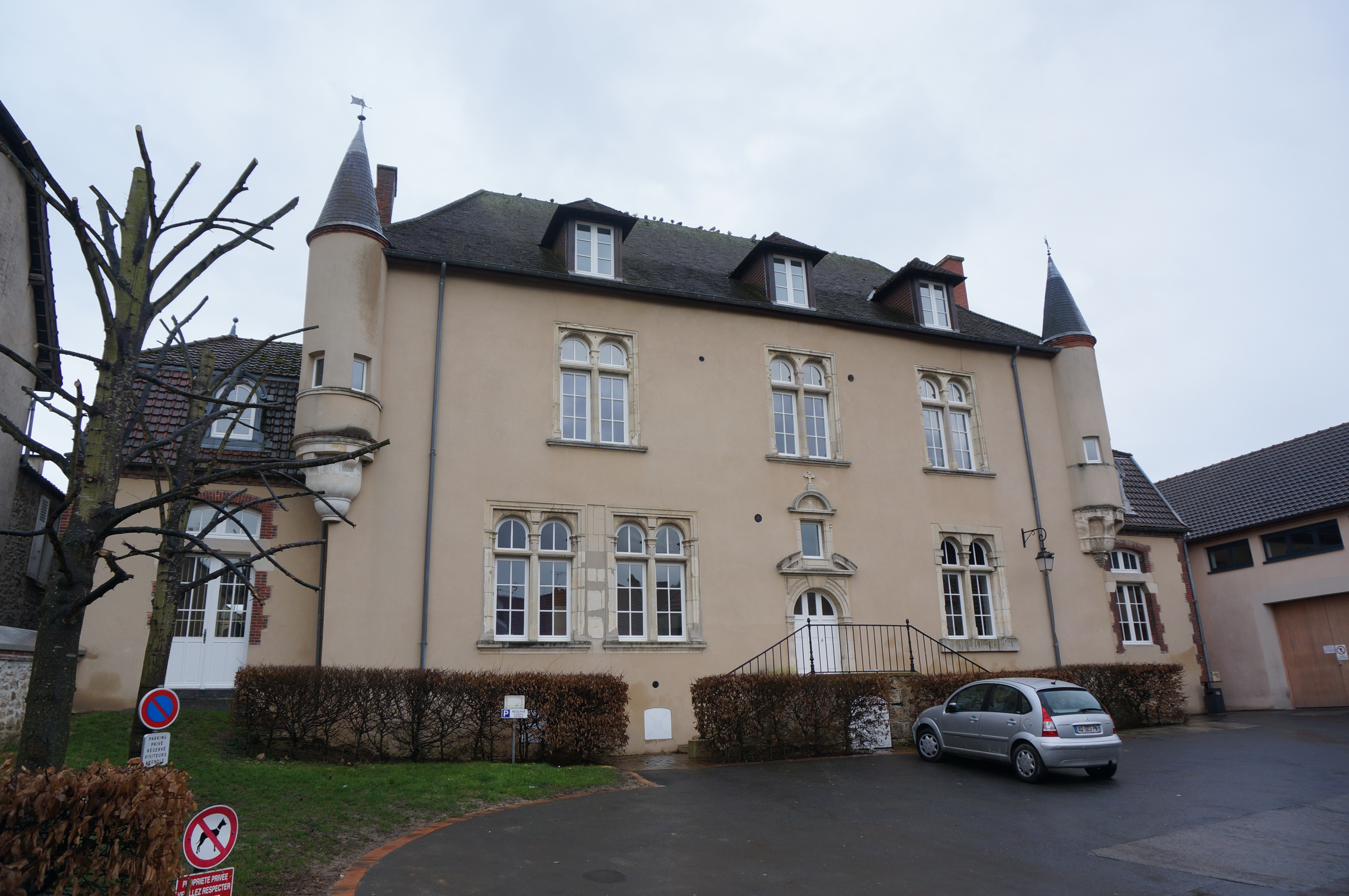
Château, Orbais-l'Abbaye

- Abbey Saint-Pierre (Abbaye Saint-Pierre)
- Tour Saint-Réole
- La source Minette

=== Abbey ===
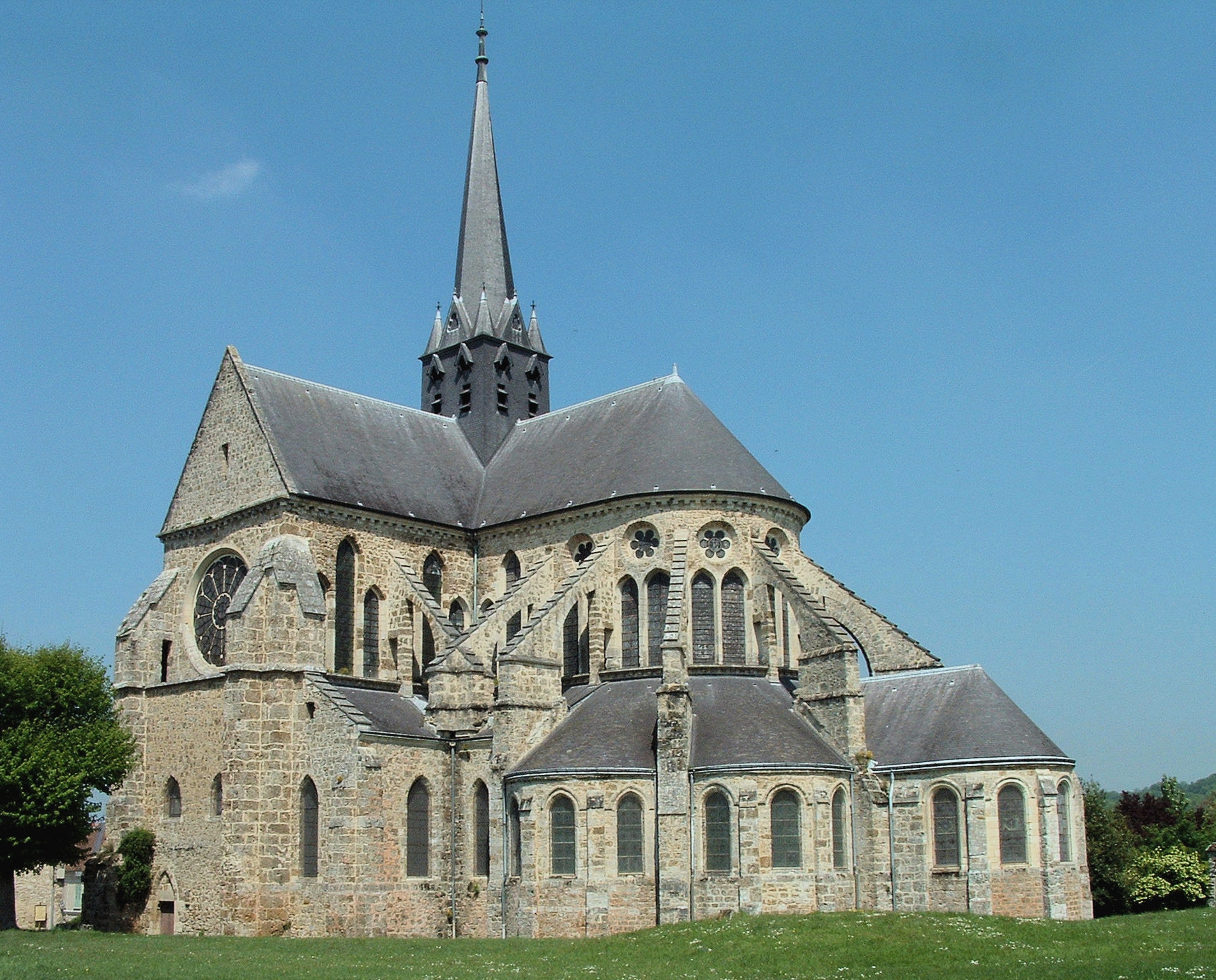
Abbey church Orbais-l'Abbaye

The St. Pierre-St. Paul church was built at the end of the 12th century and early 13th century by Jean d'Orbais, one of the architects of the Cathedral of Reims. The abbey church had a length of 78 m with eight bays of nave, two of which remain today. The architecture is superb, particularly the façade, with its two towers similar to those of the Basilica Saint-Rémi de Reims and the choir with ambulatory with five radiating chapels. There is also stained glass windows of the 12 century, funerary slabs from the 14th and 15th centuries, a baptismal font from the 16th century, the glazed tiles from the 15th century and impressive stalls of choir and very decorated misericords.

== Wine production ==
Orbais-l'Abbaye is part of the Champagne wine region. Pommery have vineyards there. In 2008 it was proposed to redraw the region boundaries, excluding Orbais-l'Abbaye. As of 2019, the change had not happened, with a final decision expected in 2024.

== Notable people ==
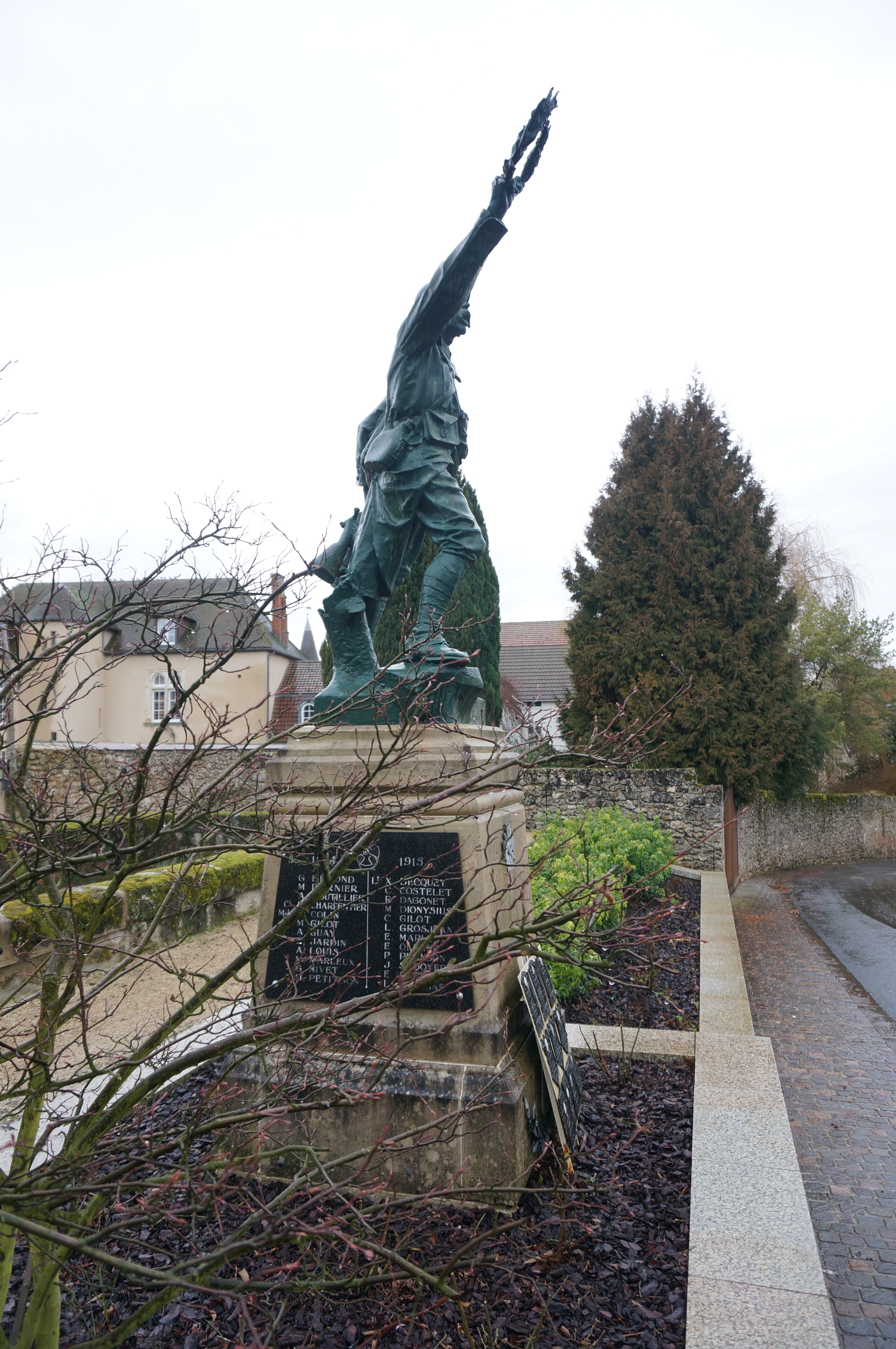
Monument (memorial) behind the château

- Gottschalk of Orbais, monk in Orbais
- Jean d'Orbais
- Rigobert (died c. 750), a Benedictine monk and later abbot of the Abbey of Orbais

== See also ==
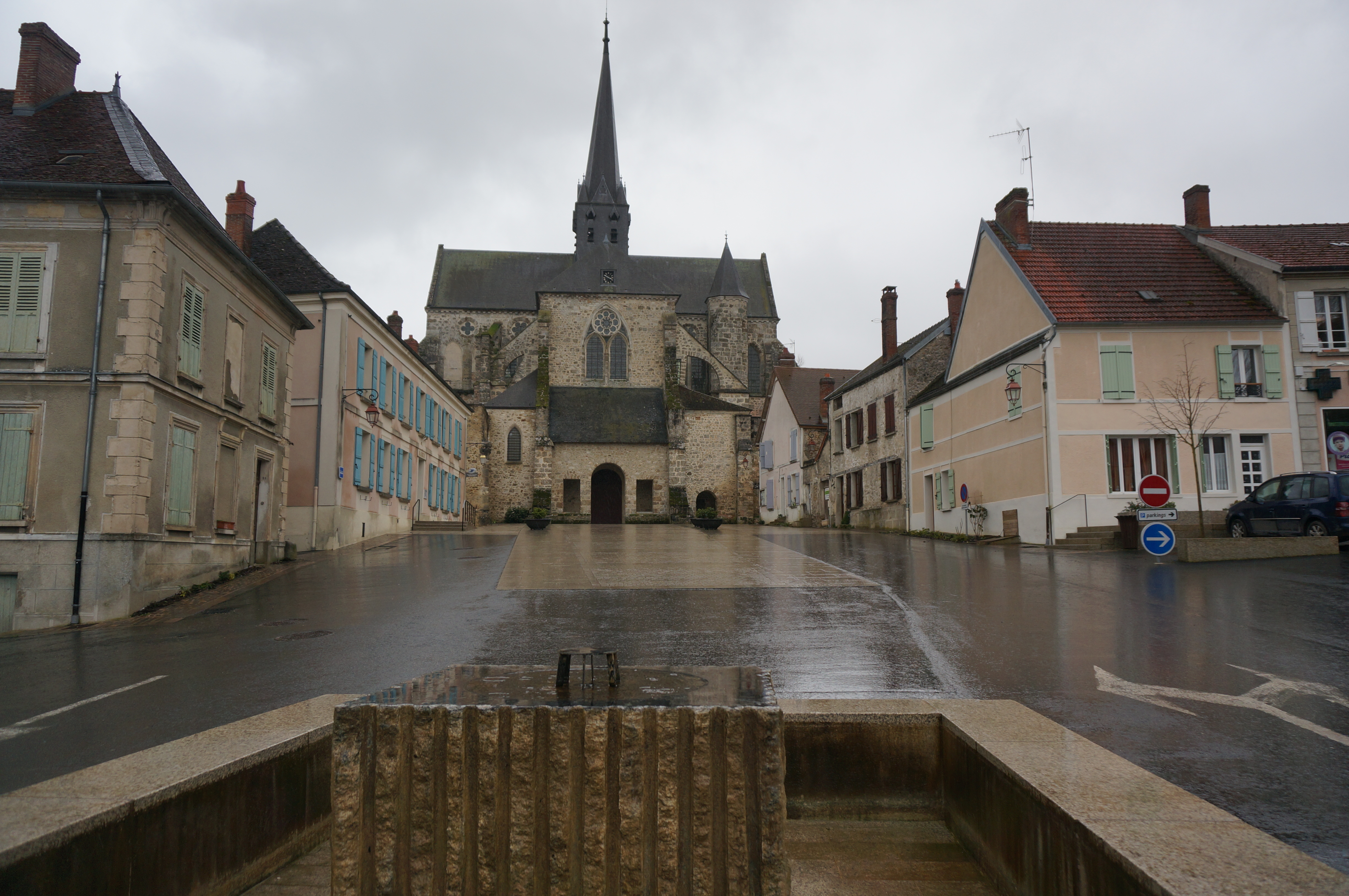
Downtown the abbey

- Communes of the Marne department
