= Bernard de Soissons =

French gothic architect

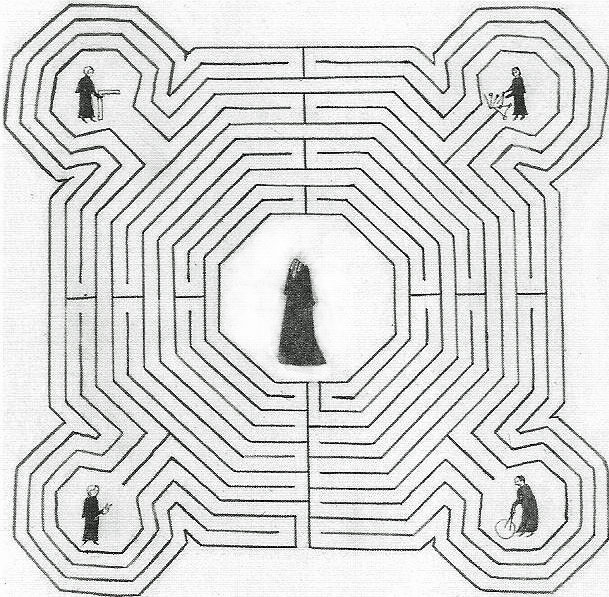
Soissons shown bottom right of the labyrinth.

Bernard de Soissons (French pronunciation: [bɛʁnaʁ də swasɔ̃]) was a French gothic architect, who participated at building of the west front of Reims Cathedral. He worked in Reims between the 1250s and the 1290s.
