= Monument historique =

National heritage tite designation in France

Monumenthiscabu logo, based on the Labyrinth of the Reims Cathedral

Monument historique (French: [mɔnymɑ̃ istɔʁik]) is a designation given to some national heritage sites in France. It may also refer to the state procedure in France by which national heritage protection is extended to a building, a specific part of a building, a collection of buildings, a garden, a bridge, or other structure, because of their importance to France's architectural and historical cultural heritage. Both public and privately owned structures may be listed in this way, as well as movable objects. As of 2012, there were 44,236 monuments listed.

The term "classification" is reserved for designation performed by the French Ministry of Culture for a monument of national-level significance. Monuments of lesser significance may be "inscribed" by various regional entities.

Buildings may be given the classification (or inscription) for either their exteriors or interiors. A monument's designation could be for a building's décor, its furniture, a single room, or even a staircase. An example is the monument historique classification of the décor in the café "Deux Garçons" in Aix-en-Provence whose patrons once included Alphonse de Lamartine, Émile Zola and Paul Cézanne. Some buildings are designated because of their connection to a single personality, such as the Auberge Ravoux in Auvers-sur-Oise which is designated an MH because of its connection to the painter Vincent van Gogh. Since the 1990s, a significant number of places have been given the designation because of their historical importance to science.

The MH designation traces its roots to the French Revolution when the government appointed Alexandre Lenoir to specify and safeguard certain structures. Though the first classifications were given in the 19th century by the writer Prosper Mérimée, inspector-general of historical monuments, by a first list established in 1840. In 1851, Mérimée organized the Mission héliographique to document France's medieval architecture.

A monument historique may be marked by the official logo for the program, signage for which is distributed by the Union Rempart, a union of French historical restoration associations. It consists of a design representing the labyrinth that used to be in Reims Cathedral, which is itself a World Heritage Site. Use of the logo is optional.

== Terminology ==
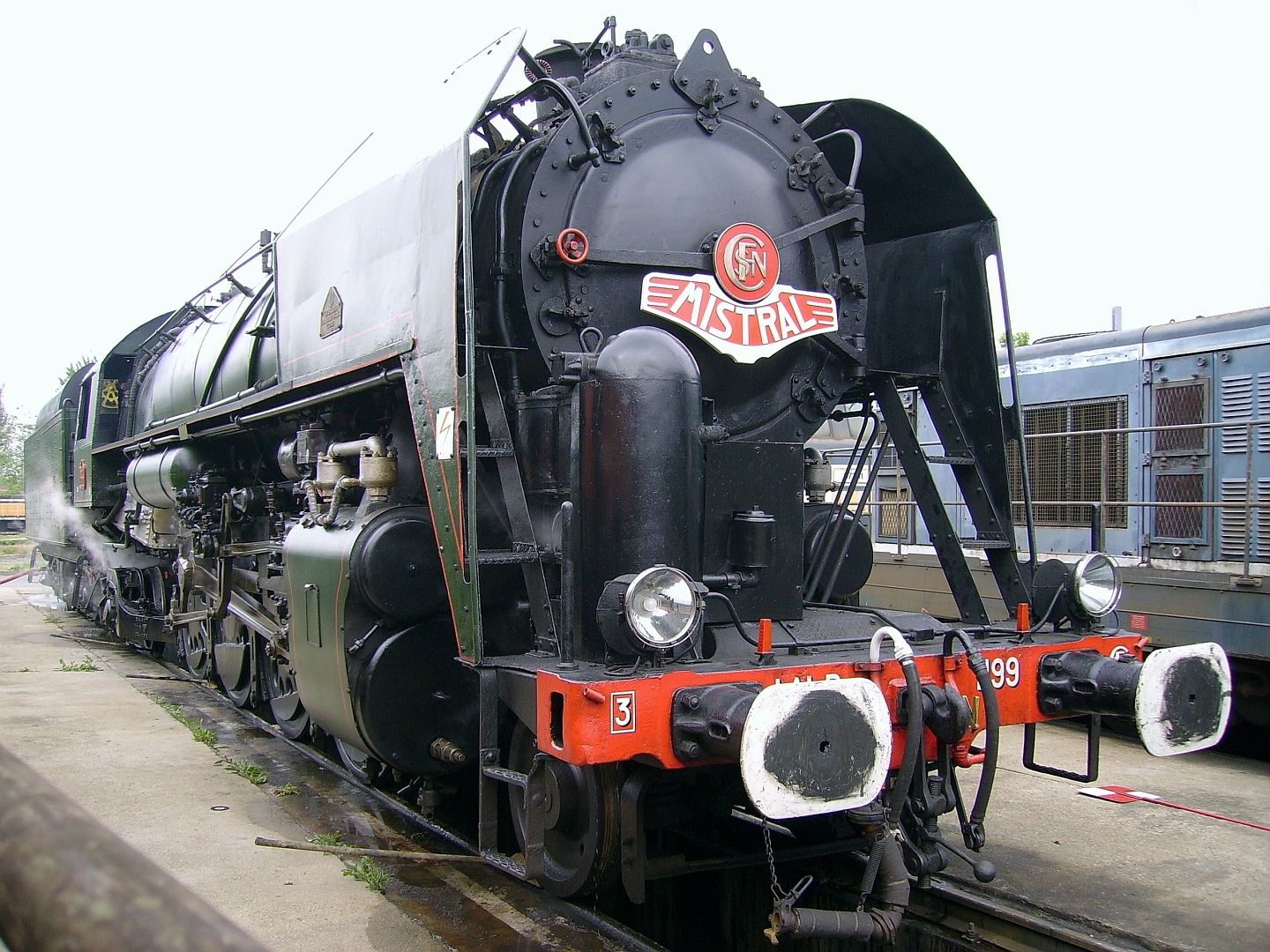
Despite its size, the steam locomotive 141 R 1199 is classified as an object, as boats can also be.

The notion of historical monument, sparked by both the ideas of the French Revolution and Romanticism, led to a policy of protection founded by the July Monarchy. This is a recognition of public interest for buildings (buildings, gardens and parks, archaeological reserves, etc.) which more specifically concerns the art and history attached to the monument and constitutes a public utility easement.

There are two levels of protection: "registration as historical monuments" (formerly known as "registration in the supplementary inventory of historic monuments"), for furniture and buildings of regional interest, and the "classification as historical monuments" to a level of national interest. Usually, places (in the first case) are said to be "registered", and objects are said to be "classified".

The two protections can also apply to movable objects (either furniture proper, or buildings by destination) of historical, artistic, technical, etc. interest. under the name of "classification under object title" or (rarer) of "registration under object title" as well as for the census.

Long subject to the provisions of the law of 31 December 1913, classification and registration are now governed by Title II of Book VI of the Heritage Code and can take 15 to 18 months (legislative part and regulatory part) to fully enshrine a place or object. From a legal point of view, this protection constitutes an official French label.

== History ==
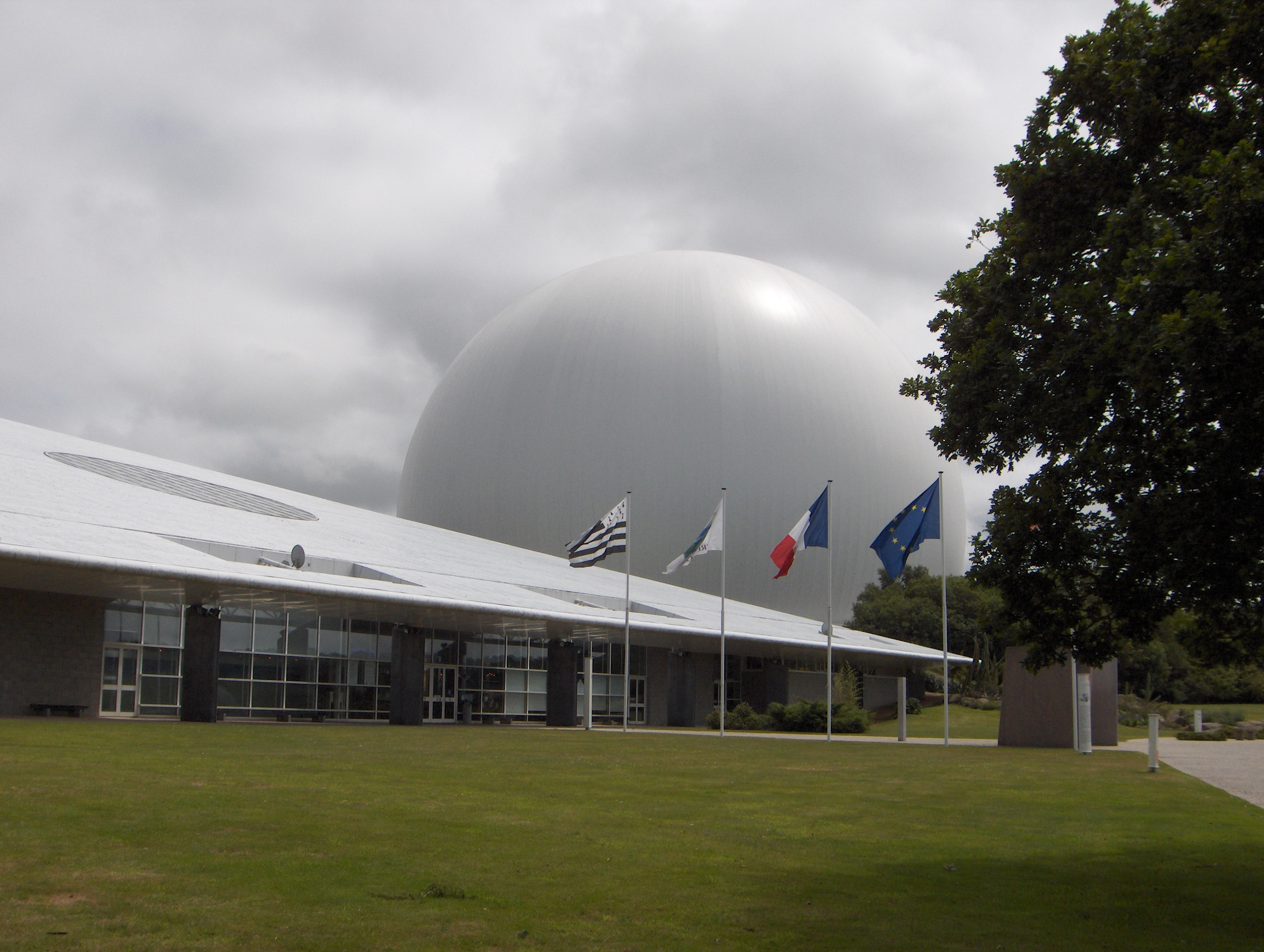
The dome covering the antenna of the space telecommunications center of Pleumeur-Bodou was classified in 2000 as historical monuments and according to the label "Patrimoine du XXe siècle" (Patrimony of the 20th century).

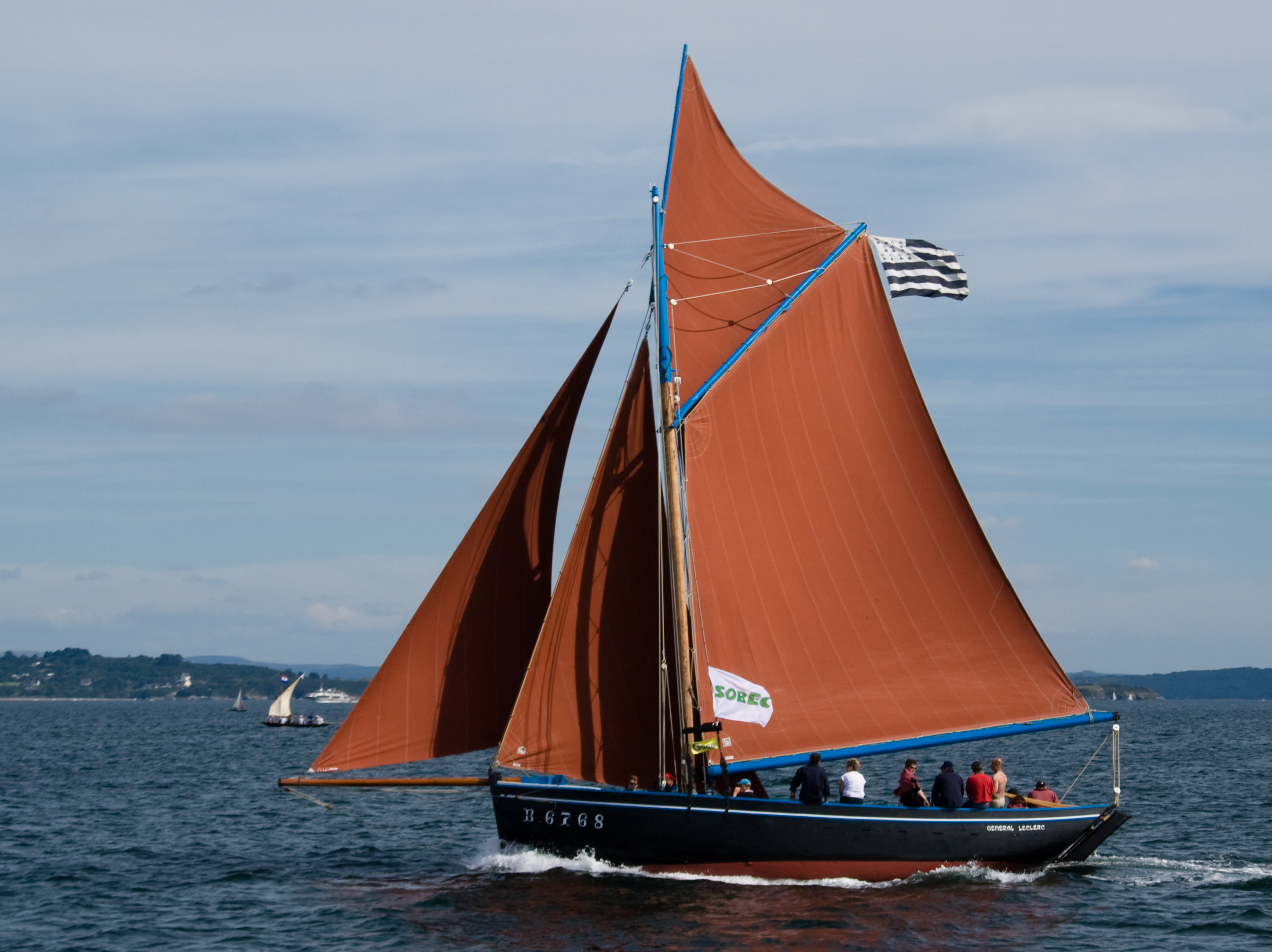
The General Leclerc, sloop shelly in Brest, classified as a historical monument in 2005

=== Genesis ===
The biens nationaux ("National Properties"), created in the wake of the nationalization of Church property (Decree of the clergy property made available to the Nation of 2 November 1789), emigrants (Decree of 9 November 1791) and the crown of France (Decree of 10 August 1792), have had varying fortunes. Some were appropriated by the state due to popular vindictiveness, giving rise to the notion of vandalism invented by the Abbé Grégoire in a report presented to the Convention on 31 August 1794 on "the destruction carried out by vandalism and the means of recovering it". Other properties have been kept by the state and have changed functions (prisons such as Maguelone, Clairvaux, Mont-Saint-Michel), but the greater part were sold to individuals, often to serve as a quarry for building materials and have disappeared (Abbey of Cluny, Vézelay Abbey, etc.).

In 1790, Aubin Louis Millin spoke for the first time of "historical monument" in a report submitted to the Constituent Assembly on the occasion of the demolition of the Bastille. The phrase "Historic monument" thus became symbolic of the pre-revolutionary era, the Ancien Régime. The idea of preserving a site linked to the Ancien Régime circulated, and the Assembly, under the impetus of Talleyrand, adopted the decree of 13 October 1790, which created the Commission of Monuments, whose role is to study "the fate of monuments, arts and sciences". In 1791, Alexandre Lenoir was appointed to create the Museum of French Monuments, opened in 1795, in which he gathered the fragments of architecture that he had managed to save from destruction over the previous several years. But this museum was closed by Louis XVIII under the ordinance of 24 April 1816, during the Restoration, and its collections, which were to be returned "to families and churches", were ultimately dispersed from state control.

The vandalism of the French built environment that accompanied the anticlerical nature of the French Revolution subsequently inspired numerous responses, particularly ones tinged with nostalgia and romanticism; for example, either Chateaubriand or Victor Hugo published in 1825 a pamphlet, War for Demolition. The protection of historic monuments necessarily involves the creation of an inventory, and from 1795 onward the council of civil buildings completed the inventory of the castles that Louis XVI had started.

In 1820, Baron Taylor and Charles Nodier published their Picturesque and Romantic Voyages in Ancient France, at the time when the first archaeological societies in the country were being formed. The Celtic Academy was founded in 1804 by Éloi Johanneau and others, who met for the first time on 3 Ventôse year XIII (22 February 1805). This first association was to be devoted only to the study of the Celts, but quickly its members became interested in national antiquities. As early as 1811, Roquefort proposed to change the name of the society to give it one more in line with its activity. The new statutes as well as the new one of the company, Société des antiquaires de France, were adopted on 29 October 1813. Arcisse de Caumont founded the Society of Antiquaries of Normandy in 1824, and the French Society of Archeology in 1834. The Archaeological Society of the South of France was founded by Alexandre Du Mège in 1831. In 1834 the Société des antiquaires de l'Ouest was founded in Poitiers by Charles Mangon de La Lande from members of the Academic Society of Agriculture, Belles Lettres, Sciences and Arts of Poitiers, itself founded in 1818. Other societies would follow in the various departements such as the Société des antiquaires de Picardie à Amiens. In turn, the Committee for Historical and Scientific Work was founded by François Guizot in 1834 to direct research and support that of various learned societies.

=== Creation of the monuments historiques, 1819–1880 ===
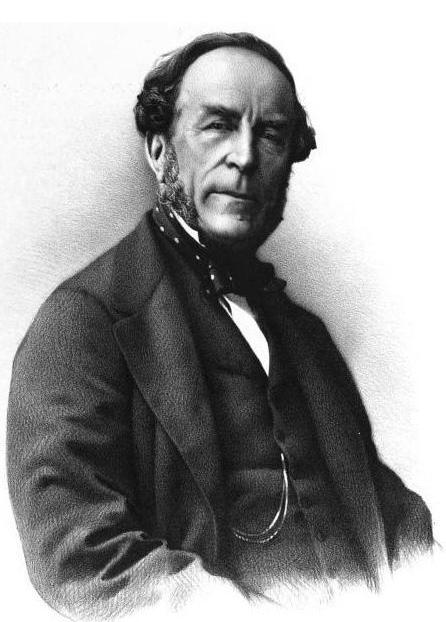
Ludovic Vitet served as the first Inspector of Historic Monuments from 1830 to 1834.

In 1819, for the first time, the budget of the Ministry of the Interior included an allowance of 80,000 francs for "historical monuments", about one-fifteenth of the total sum. Under the July Monarchy, on 21 October 1830, the Minister of the Interior, François Guizot proposed in a report presented to King Louis-Philippe to create the post of Inspector of Historic Monuments which he assigned to Ludovic Vitet on 25 November 1830, then reassigned to Prosper Mérimée on 27 May 1834. The mission of the Inspector of Historic Monuments was to classify the buildings and to distribute the funds for maintenance and restoration. On 29 September 1837, the Minister of the Interior, the Count of Montalivet, officially established the Commission for Historic Monuments (Commission des monuments historiques), succeeding the former Committee for the Arts. Composed of seven volunteers and chaired by Jean Vatout, the Director of Public monuments, the new Commission carried out inventory and classification work (classification on the basis of political considerations then emphasizing around 1835 sites primarily of historical interest only, expanded from 1841 to include those for their architectural quality) and the allocation of funding. It was also responsible for training architects who work on monuments (starting with Eugène-Emmanuel Viollet-le-Duc).

In 1840, the Commission published its first list, composed of 1082 historical monuments, including 934 buildings. This list consisted only of prehistoric monuments and ancient and medieval buildings (those constructed between the 5th and 16th centuries), which predictably included many religious buildings, but also objects that today might be termed broadly "material culture", such as the Bayeux Tapestry. All of these sites were and remain properties of the state, the department or the municipality in which they are located, the conservation of which requires work (and therefore funds).

Subsequently, the Commission continued its inventory work, and the historical monuments increased in number and the area of protection widened in three directions: chronological, categorical (that is, towards vernacular architecture), and typological or conceptual (towards the protection of buildings representing a particular type—i.e., the typicum—and no longer just the unique structure or unicum). Thus for this purpose, in 1851 the Commission created the Mission Héliographique, responsible for photographing French monuments, one of the earliest and most significant widespread and systematic uses of photography, one of whose chief employees was Édouard-Denis Baldus. However, local authorities, the Catholic Church and the French Army were reluctant to recognize the prerogatives of the state over their heritage; furthermore, the classification of monuments that were privately owned required the owners' consent. These obstacles explain why the number of monuments classified annually actually decreased from 2,800 in 1848 to 1,563 in 1873.

=== Development and expansion, 1880–1930 ===
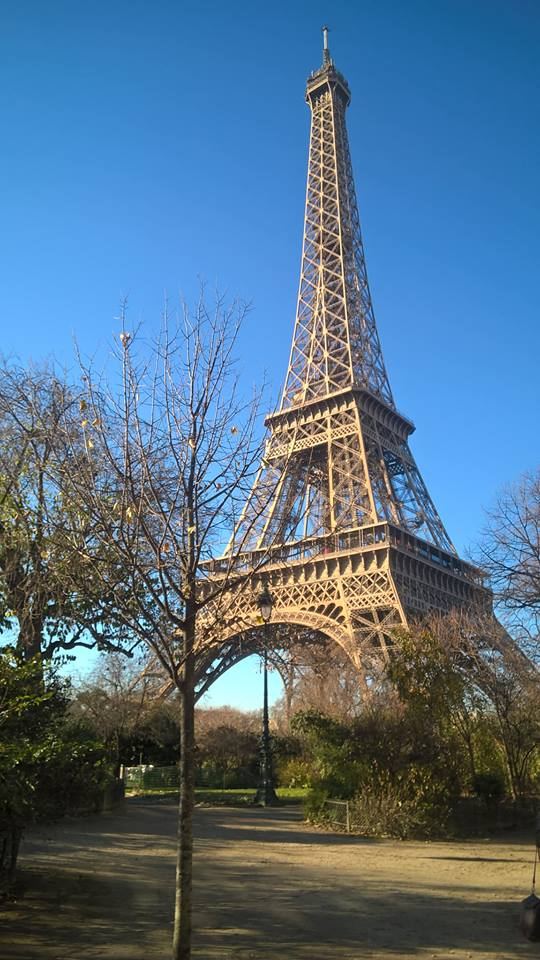
The Eiffel Tower was registered as a historic monument on 24 June 1964.

The law of 30 March 1887, for the conservation of historic monuments, enumerated for the first time the specific criteria and procedure for official classification of monuments. It also contains provisions establishing the body of chief architects of historic monuments (or ACMH, drawing inspiration from the situation of diocesan architects in the Service des Edifices Diocésains—a state agency designed for the specific upkeep of church properties—and gradually replacing local architects) established by decree of 26 January 1892. In 1893 the first competition of the ACMH took place, and finally in 1907 a decree permanently enshrined their legal status.

Proposed by the Minister of Public Education Aristide Briand, the law of April 21, 1906, on the protection of natural sites and monuments of artistic character, resulted from the action carried out among others by the Society of Friends of Trees (founded in 1898 by Julien-François Jeannel), the French Alpine Club, the Society for the Protection of Landscapes and the aesthetics of France, and the Touring Club of France, which had all protested vigorously against the effects of industrialization. the 1906 law laid down the principle of classification of picturesque natural sites.

Under the 1905 French law on the Separation of the Churches and the State, local communities and the state were entrusted with the responsibility of the religious buildings, but certain communes refused to take charge of some of these buildings, which were not considered to be of "national interest", while other localities did not hesitate to auction off their heritage, which caused scandals and revealed the weaknesses of the legislative texts of 1887. The law of December 31, 1913, on historic monuments complemented and improved the provisions of the 1887 law, widening the field of protection of the classification criteria (to properties whose conservation no longer responds simply to the notion of "national interest" but to that of "public interest", which also takes into account the small local heritage classification extended to private property without needing the consent of the owner, a prelude to registration in the additional inventory), defining the obligatory actors, establishing criminal and civil sanctions in the event of unauthorized work on listed monuments, etc. That same year, the Commission of Historic Monuments also accepted four castles dating from later than the Middle Ages: Luxembourg Palace, Versailles, Maisons-Laffitte, and the Louvre. At the end of 1911, more than 4,000 buildings and 14,000 objects were classified.

During the 1920s and 1930s, the classification opened up to private heritage, which created an easement which was then considered as a deprivation of property (see on this subject the Royal Saltworks of Arc-et-Senans in 1926), but which was then compensated by the subsidization of works, then by tax advantages. It also opens up to the Renaissance and the age of neoclassicism, roughly from the 16th to the 18th century (e.g., the Church of St. Genevieve of Paris in 1920). There was also the acceptance, timidly, of eclectic architecture of the 19th century: the classification in 1923 of the Opera Garnier. With the abandonment of the sites by the military following World War I, Renaissance and neoclassical military architecture began to be classified as well. Finally, it was during this period that a sort of second-order classification was invented: the "inscription in the supplementary inventory of historical monuments", in 1925, which in 2005 became the "inscription under the title of historic monuments."

=== Extension and evolution of protections (since 1930) ===
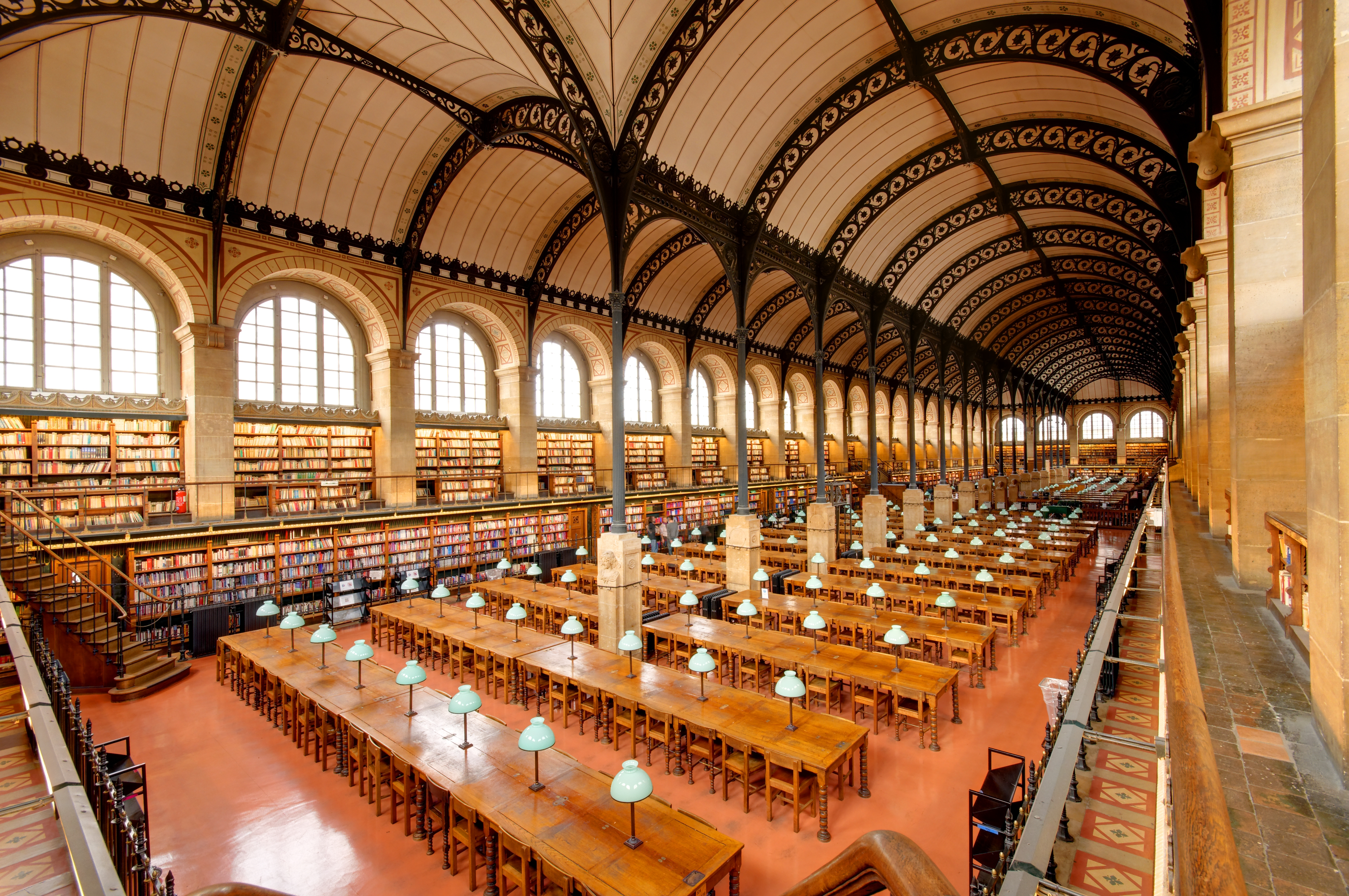
Henri Labrouste's Bibliothèque Sainte-Geneviève, with its famous reading room, was not listed until 1988.

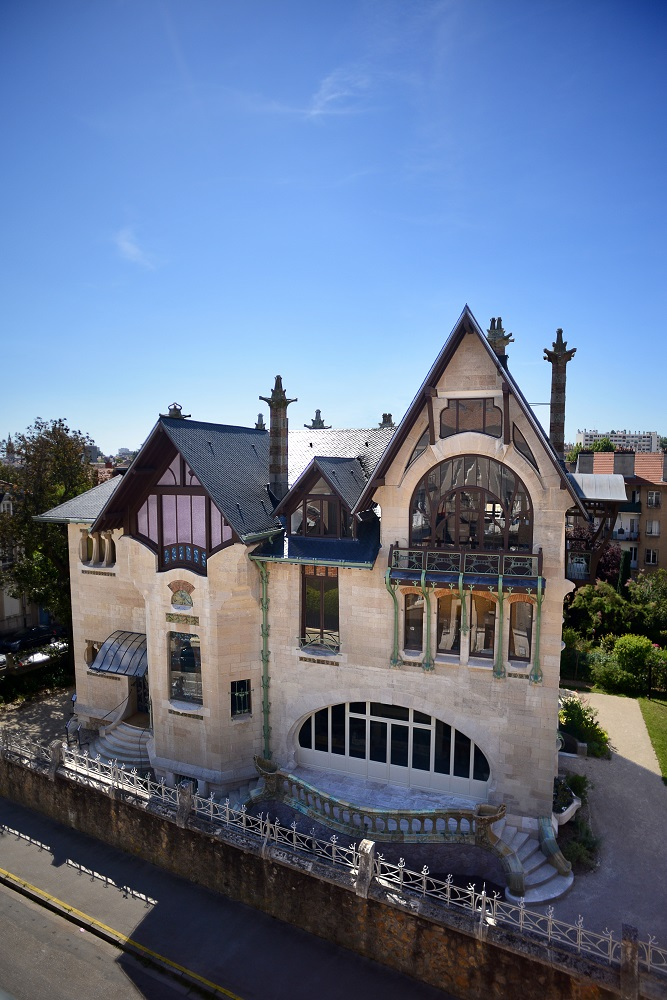
The Villa Majorelle in Nancy was one of the early sites classified as "20th Century Heritage", as part of the work of the Ecole de Nancy in 1999.

The law of May 2, 1930, which replaced that of 1906, consolidated the procedures for classifying built monuments on the one hand, and that of sites and natural spaces, by creating the category of "classified site and registered site". It also introduced the possibility of classifying as a site an area located near a listed or registered building. The protection of classified natural sites is currently governed by the Environment Code. The law of February 25, 1943, modifying the law of December 31, 1913, clarifies these provisions by introducing a field of vision of 500 meters. The law of 1943 indeed considers that a monument is also the impression that its surroundings give. This is why the law imposes a form of vigilance with regard to work projects in the field of visibility of historic monuments. Numerous classifications are made during the Occupation, in order to prevent destruction by the occupier, but also to make the people in charge of protection work partly in order to escape the compulsory labor service in Nazi Germany.

The Eiffel Tower was listed as a historical monument by decree of June 24, 1964.

After the Second World War and the massive destruction due to the German bombings of 1940 and the Allies of 1944 and 1945, and the economic boom of the Thirty Glorious Years during which destruction continues to rebuild something new, the protection in reaction changes scale. On October 4, 1962, a new law empowered the Minister of Culture André Malraux to safeguard sectors of towns that were first created by the decree of March 4, 1964. As a result, the service of the General Inventory of monuments and artistic riches of France does not list only singular historical monuments. Meanwhile, historic buildings open to civil architecture sixteenth to the eighteenth century, the vernacular and native architecture starting with the Palais idéal du facteur Cheval, in 1969, and the monumental architecture of the nineteenth and twentieth centuries. This is when a few of those monuments were entered or classified:

- the Eiffel Tower (1887–1889), inscribed in 1964
- the Villa Savoye (1929–1931), listed in 1965
- the Notre-Dame-du-Haut chapel in Ronchamp (1950–1955), listed in 1965 and then classified in 1967
- the Notre-Dame du Raincy church (1922–1923), listed in 1966
- the Villa Stein (1927–1928), inscribed in 1975
- the Unité d'Habitation (or Cité Radieuse) of Marseilles (1945–1952), classified in 1995
- the Church of the Sacred Heart of Audincourt (1949–1951), classified in 1996
- the Notre-Dame-de-Any-Grâce church on the Assy plateau, classified in 2004

Metallic architecture took a long time to be recognized and classified: Les Halles by Victor Baltard were destroyed between 1969 and 1971 (only one pavilion was classified as a historical monument and was reassembled in Nogent-sur-Marne in 1977, outside its context of origin), the Bibliothèque Sainte-Geneviève by Henri Labrouste was not registered until 1988.

Archives, which are collection of documents, were eligible to be classified as "historical monuments", until the passage of a 1979 law on archives. This established a specific regime (currently codified in book II of the heritage code), which is, however, inspired by much of the regime of historical monuments.

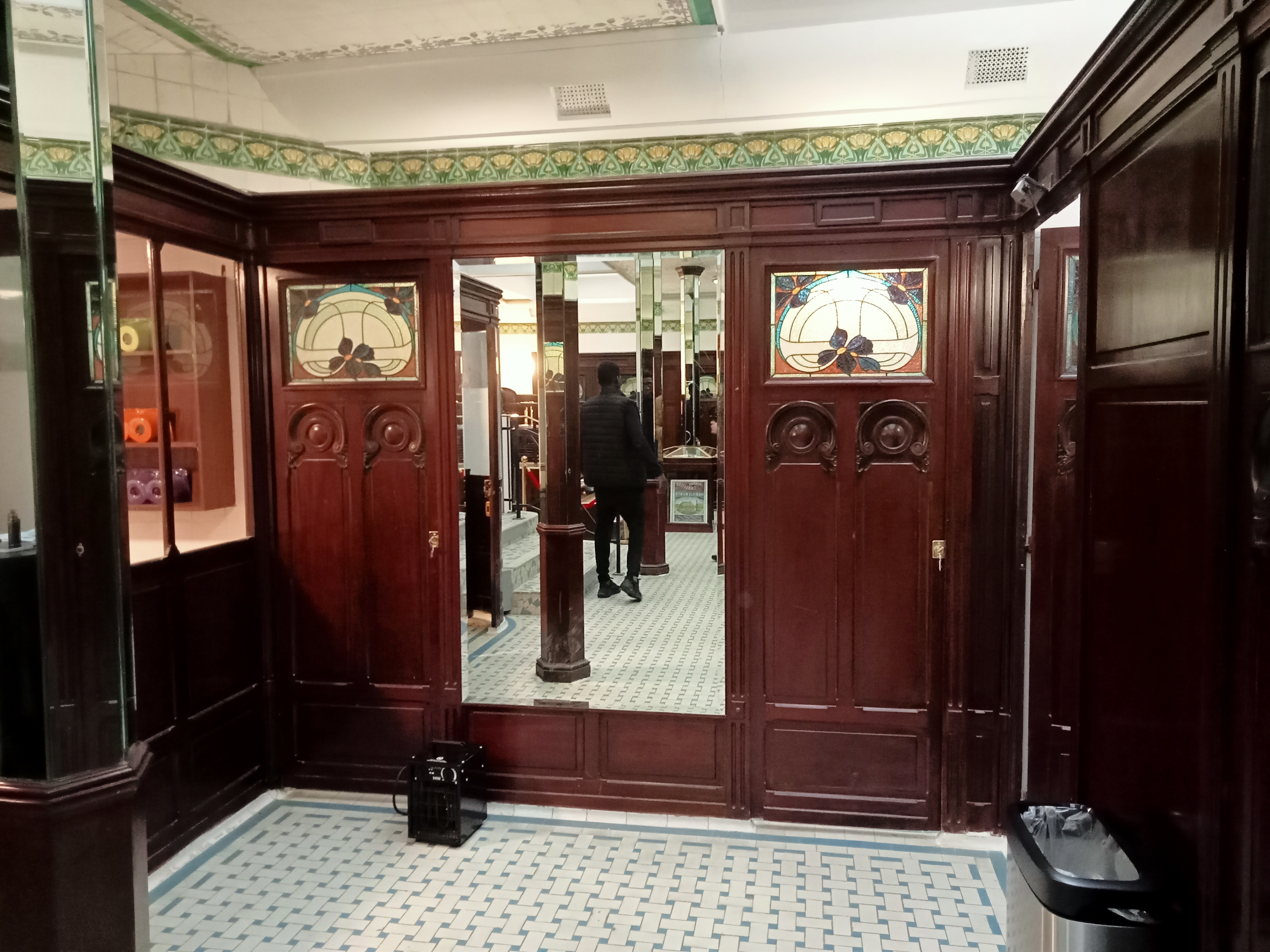
Lavatory Madeleine, the first underground public toilet in France, was granted the heritage status in 2011,

The end of the 1980s and the beginning of the 1990s saw the beginning of the protection of the industrial heritage, both the architecture (the mill of the Menier chocolate factory by Jules Saulnier in Noisiel was classified in 1992) and the machines (the automobile collection Schlumpf was classified in 1978 to avoid its dispersion). At the same time the mission of maritime and fluvial heritage, with the classification of lighthouses, beacons, river cranes, then boats (the first of these were the three-masted Duchesse Anne and the barge Mad-Atao in 1982), etc. The first underground public toilet of France, the Lavatory Madeleine, was granted the heritage status in 2011.

Also protected are historic villages: Joan of Arc's birthplace (classified from 1840) or that of Napoleon I, the wall of Federated, Oradour-sur-Glane (ranked May 10, 1946), etc.; and gardens: around 1920 the parks of Versailles and Fontainebleau were listed, as was that of Azay-le-Rideau around 1930.

Other monuments, reflections of French Art Nouveau (in particular the movement of the Ecole de Nancy) were also listed at the end of the 1990s, mainly in Nancy. To accentuate this visibility, the label "Heritage 20th century" was created in 1999, automatically assigned to all the historical monuments built during the 20th century, but the present buildings in ZPPAUP or offered for regional commission heritage and architecture.

The name "additional inventory of historic monuments" was replaced by "registration as historical monuments" in 2005.

== Historical distribution and statistics ==
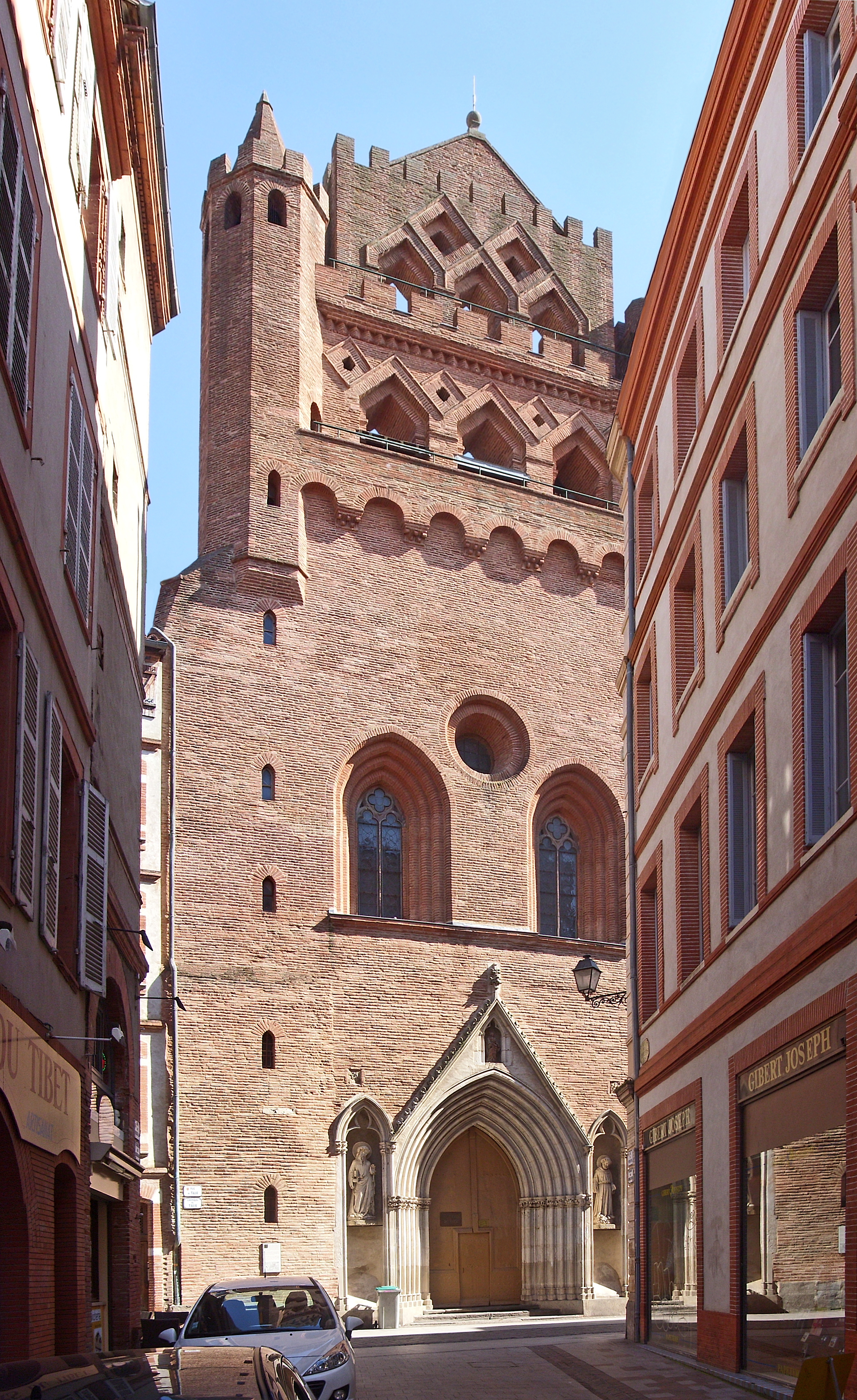
The Church of Notre-Dame du Taur in Toulouse (Haute-Garonne) was one of the original historic monuments classified by the French state in 1840.

As of 1 February 2015, there were 43,600 buildings protected as historical monuments in France (14,100 classified and 29,500 registered), as well as around 300,000 movable objects (more than 135,000 classified and around 150,000 registered) to which it is necessary to add 1,400 musical organs. 49.4% of historical monuments are private property; the municipalities own 55.82%, versus 5.67% for the state and 3.6% for other local authorities. A third of historical monuments concern domestic architecture, 29.6% are religious buildings.

They were broken down in 2014 as follows:

- 3.82% of monuments from prehistory and protohistory;
- 1.65% of monuments of Antiquity;
- 32.67% of monuments from the Middle Ages;
- 44.24% of monuments from modern times and
- 17.62% of monuments from the contemporary period.

As of 31 December 2008, there were 43,180 monuments distributed as follows: 14,367 classified and 28,813 registered as historical monuments, 323 additional compared to 2007, 44,236 in 2012 and 44,318 in 2014.

But the control of the architect of the buildings of France is also exercised by the means of the requirement, since 1977, of his agreement on the permit to demolish buildings located in the perimeters protected for their patrimonial or environmental interest (sites registered, etc.), as well as since 1943 on all works located in covisibility and, henceforth, in the vicinity of historical monuments by virtue of the provisions of Article L. 621–30.II of the Heritage Code, or in remarkable heritage sites (former sectors saved) since 1964. In reality, there are therefore several hundred thousand existing buildings, if not several million, which are directly or indirectly protected in France by a rigorous aesthetic and heritage control, during any work on them.

Faced with the sharp increase in the number of historical monuments, some authors such as Françoise Choay consider that the historic monument has become a kind of Noah syndrome: the state continues to register historical monuments in greater quantity than what it can actually occupy.

Currently, the restoration credits allocated by the Ministry of Culture are decentralized in the DRACs or managed by the operator of heritage and real estate projects for culture.

=== Classification by decade ===
The following graphs summarize the number of classification and registration as historical monuments by decade, since 1840.

== Institutions relating to heritage protection ==
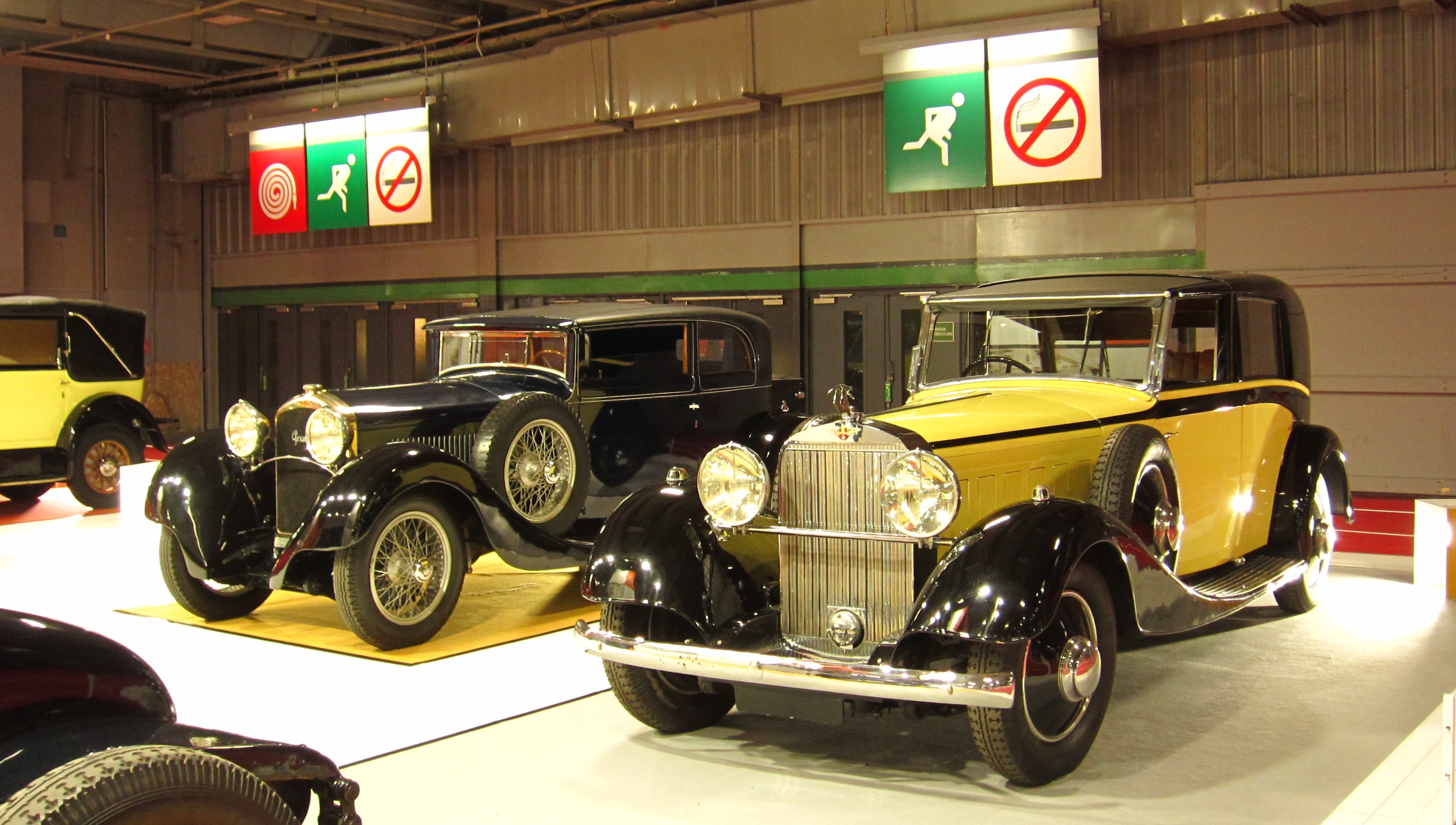
The Schlumpf automobile collection was classified as a monument historique in 2018 to prevent its dispersal. It is on display in Paris at the National Museum of the Automobile.

=== Architecture and Heritage Media Library ===
The Architecture and Heritage Media Library (MAP) is responsible for collecting, conserving and communicating the archives and documentation of the administration of historic monuments since its creation in 1830 and the state's photographic heritage, comprising more than four million prints and fifteen million negatives dating back to the origins of photography and including those relating to historical monuments.

To this end, the MAP is made up of four scientific departments: archives and library, documentation, photography and the Center for Research on Historical Monuments (CRMH) and has three sites in Île-de-France: the main site of the media library, installed in Charenton-le-Pont in its premises refurbished in April 2014; the Fort de Saint-Cyr site for the photographic archives; and the documentation center of the Bons Enfants site near the ministry.

In addition, the collection of models and materials (the material library) of the research center are hosted by the Chaillot school to serve as educational support for its students.

=== Historical monuments research laboratory ===
Density of monuments historiques by 100 km^{2} (red is the highest)

The historical monuments research laboratory (LRMH) is a service with national competence of the Ministry of Culture, attached to the service responsible for heritage within the General Directorate of Heritage. He is part of the Center for Research on Conservation (CRC), a team associated with USR 3224 of the National Center for Scientific Research (CNRS) also made up of the Center for Research on the Conservation of Collections (CRCC) and the Conservation-Research of the Music Museum.

The LRMH is responsible for carrying out scientific and technical studies as well as research on the conservation of buildings and cultural heritage objects protected as Historical Monuments. He studies the constituent materials and the alteration phenomena that compromise their conservation. He works on the treatments to be applied to altered works, as well as on the conservation conditions of the monuments and objects studied. It disseminates the results of its studies and research as widely as possible.

== Protection ==
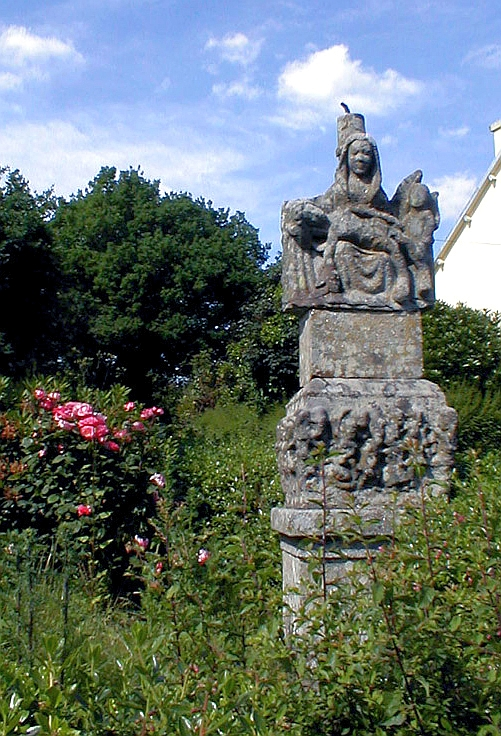
The Croix de chemin du Moustoir (Côtes-d'Armor), registered as a monument historique on 22 January 1927

There are two levels of protection:

- The classement au titre des monuments historiques is a national level of importance for the objects or buildings;
- The inscription au titre des monuments historiques is a regional level of importance for the objects or buildings (until 2005 formerly called the inventaire supplémentaire des monuments historiques, ISMH).

These two levels of protection are determined after a thorough historical study by the prefect for the region, or by the Minister of Culture for the national level. They are aided by the advice of a commission named Commission régionale du patrimoine et des sites.

=== Protection proposal ===
The buildings are classified or listed as historical monuments respectively according to the provisions of Articles L. 621–1 and L. 621–25 et seq. of the Heritage Code.

The classification process can be proposed by the owner or any public actor (territorial architecture and heritage service which has become a departmental architecture and heritage unit, regional inventory service, etc.) or private (heritage conservation associations, for example), with the architect of buildings in France with territorial jurisdiction or the Regional Conservation of Historic Monuments attached to the Regional Directorate of Cultural Affairs. In the context of buildings or objects requiring an archaeological study or found during excavations, the regional archeology service can examine the file.

The protection request file is generally made up by the documentary study officers of the Regional Conservation of Historic Monuments. The file must include a documentary part giving detailed information on the building (history, urban situation, legal, etc.) and photographic and cartographic documents. It also includes the opinions of the chief architect of historical monuments, of the architect of buildings of France and of the curator of historic monuments.

=== Establishment of protection for historical monuments ===
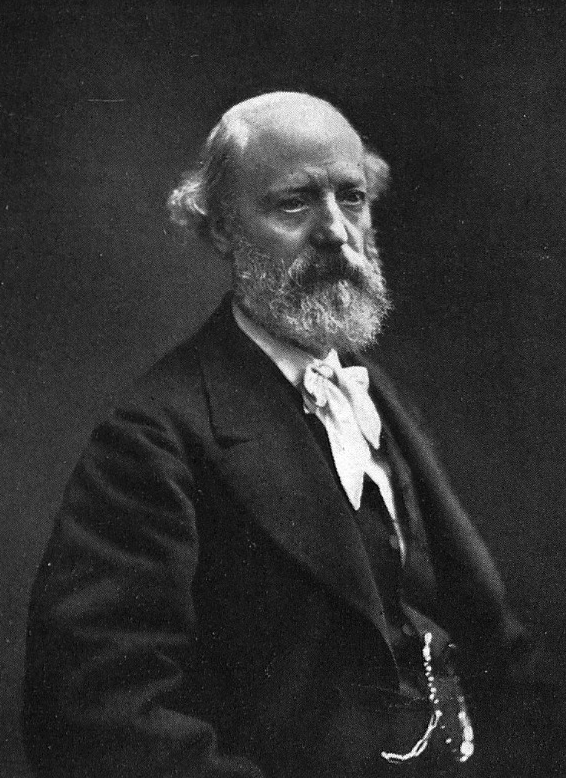
Eugène-Emmanuel Viollet-le-duc, a friend of Prosper Merrimée, was one of the first architects employed to restore some of the first buildings listed on the Historic Monuments register in 1840.

The protection file thus constituted is then submitted to the opinion of the regional commission for heritage and architecture (CRPA) chaired by the regional prefect.

The prefect, according to the opinion of the commission, can issue a registration order, or refuse it. Whether the decree is taken or not, he can also choose, depending on the wish expressed by the commission or not, to send the file to the Ministry of Culture for classification. In the event that the file is submitted to the Minister, the National Heritage and Architecture Commission makes a decision and then has two possibilities: either it proposes the classification, or it proposes or confirms the registration if the building presented does not justify not a ranking. In the case of acceptance of the owner, the minister signs the order of ranking, prepared by the Regional Conservation of Historical Monuments concerned. The publication of the list of protected historic monuments in the course of one year is made in an issue of The Official Journal of the French Republic of the following year, but the protection is effective from the signing of the protection order.

A registration order can be issued for a building without the agreement of the owner of the monument, unlike a classification order. In the event of refusal by the owner of the building or of the object that it is proposed to classify, the classification can be carried out ex officio by decree in Council of State. The registration of a movable object belonging to a private person cannot be made without his consent.

In case of emergency (danger, safeguarding of heritage, etc.), a classification authority procedure can be set up by the administrative authority (minister or prefect). The administration then has a period of one year to set up the procedure, on the date of notification to the owner.

Once the protection is effective, the Territorial Architecture and Heritage Service (STAP) takes over. The architect of buildings of France (ABF) is the privileged interlocutor with regard to the control of the application of the easements once the effective protection.

=== Constitution and conservation of the protection file ===
The protection file is created both in the case of registration and classification, throughout the examination of the file. It includes a historical file, summarizing the research carried out on the monument and justifying its protection (photographs showing the evolution of the monument, correspondence mentioning it, press articles, etc.) and an administrative file including the decree and the various stages protection. Finally, the file is archived and kept by the CRMH. These files are public and can be consulted, with the exception of confidential documents with regard to the law.

A summary file for the work is also compiled, including the preliminary studies of the work and the documentary files of the works executed. They can also be viewed by the public once the work is completed.

== Consequences of classification as a monument historique ==
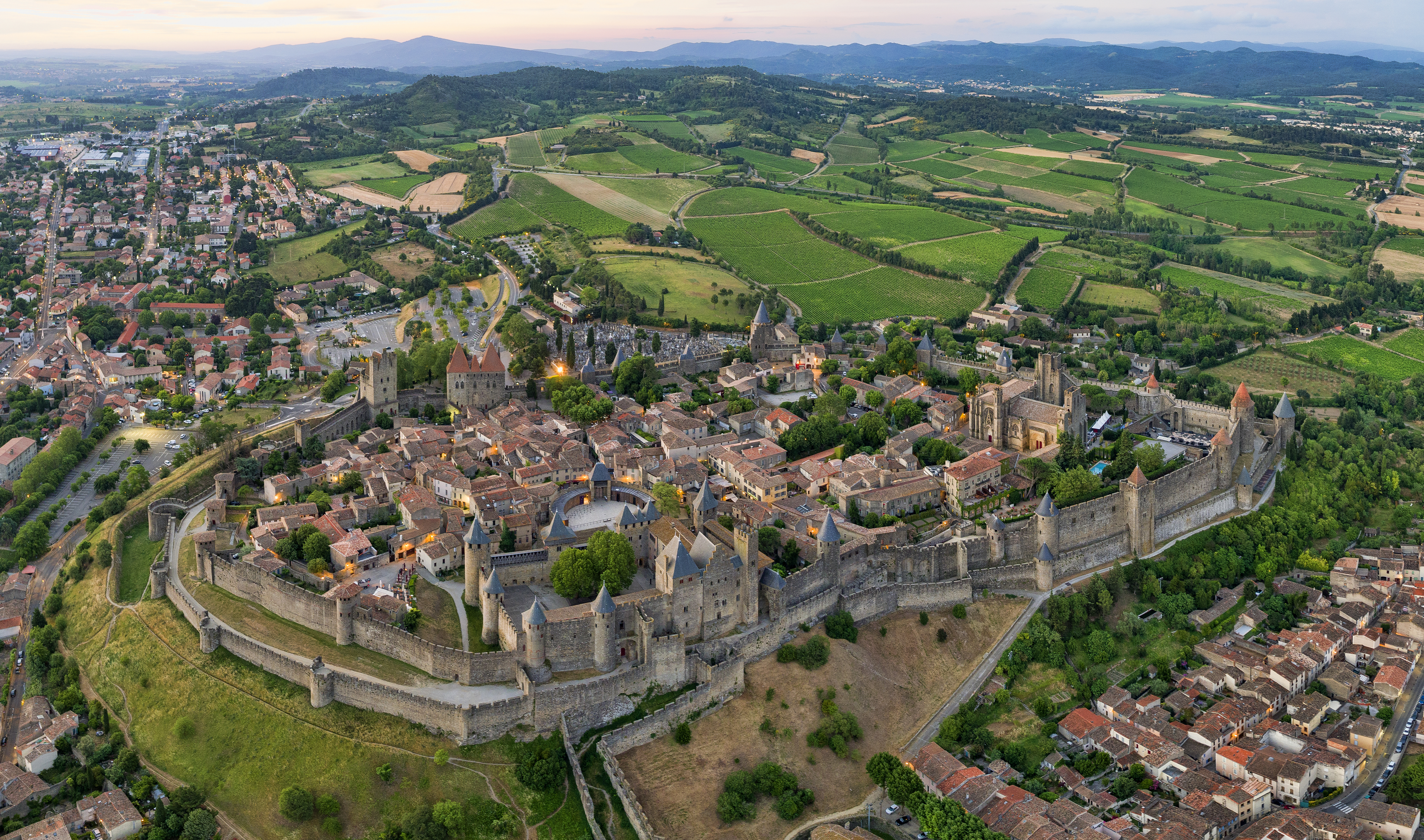
The old citadel and walls of Carcassonne were controversially restored by Viollet-le-duc to a state that had never existed at any point in history in 1853.

For any alteration to the building or listed object, the owners must make a request at least four months before the start of work to the prefect, indicating the details of the work to be carried out.

Once listed, the monument cannot be transferred (sold, bequeathed, given, etc.) without first informing the Minister of Culture. The new owner must be informed, before the sale, of the classification or the registration.

Likewise, no new construction may be built against the protected building without the prior consent of the Minister.

In return, maintenance is partially funded by the state, and tax exemption is possible for owners.

=== Maintenance and restoration of historical monuments ===
Maintenance, repair and restoration work carried out for the conservation of the building may benefit from state aid (limited to 40% of the total amount, but cumulative with those, if any, from other communities). The work authorized on a classified or registered building must be scheduled by the owner with the assistance of the architect and companies of his choice and will be carried out under the control of the administration, under the scientific and technical control of the state. When the owner, the beneficiary, his agent or any person providing proof of a title authorizing him to have work carried out informs the regional prefect of his intention to carry out a work project on a building, an object or an organ protected, the regional prefect makes available to him the state of knowledge at his disposal on the property in question and indicates to him the regulatory, architectural and technical constraints that the project must respect. An appointment with the architect of the buildings of France is more than desirable before the filing of the file. In the case of work on a classified property, the regional prefect indicates to him, depending on the nature, importance and complexity of the work envisaged, the scientific and technical studies which must be carried out prior to determining the operating program.

Since Decree no. 2009–749 of June 22, 2009, relating to the project management on buildings classified as historical monuments, the historical monuments service is withdrawing from the project management and the project management. Whereas previously, the restoration work had to be carried out by the ACHM with territorial jurisdiction and the maintenance work by the architect of the buildings of France (with an extremely blurred border since the intervention of the ABF was free), the state abolished the compulsory recourse to the administration except for its own property. Thus, all so-called "heritage" architects (that is to say, graduates of additional training, either carried out at the Ecole de Chaillot, be validated by the specialization diploma in architecture and heritage from the École Nationale Supérieure d'Architecture de Paris-Belleville or equivalent) can claim maintenance and "repair" work on a listed monument. The "restoration" works are open to competition from architects from the European community who are qualified to take the competition based on qualifications, who have ten years of experience in restoring old buildings, under the provisions codified in Articles R.621- 26 and R.621–28 of the heritage code.

In the event of an unsuccessful call for tenders, ACHM and ABF may be appointed as prime contractor. They can call on a monument restoration association, which then implements the rehabilitation of the listed heritage through concrete actions (masonry, stone cutting, guided tours, etc.) carried out by volunteers.

For listed historic monuments, the use of an architect is compulsory. All work must be the subject of a building permit (even those generally subject to prior declaration). For example, replacing shutters involves a building permit.

The amount of the possible state participation is determined by the nature of its protection (registered or classified) "taking into account the particular characteristics of this building, its current state, the nature of the planned work, and finally the efforts consented by the owner or any other person interested in the conservation of the monument." Work remaining the responsibility of the owner may be offset by tax benefits.

From 2018, old and listed buildings will be able to become producers and, possibly, self-consumers of solar energy under certain conditions, such as on outbuildings or on parts of the building that are not visible (for some time now, architects have sometimes allowed "discrete solar tiles").

=== Consequences on the surroundings ===
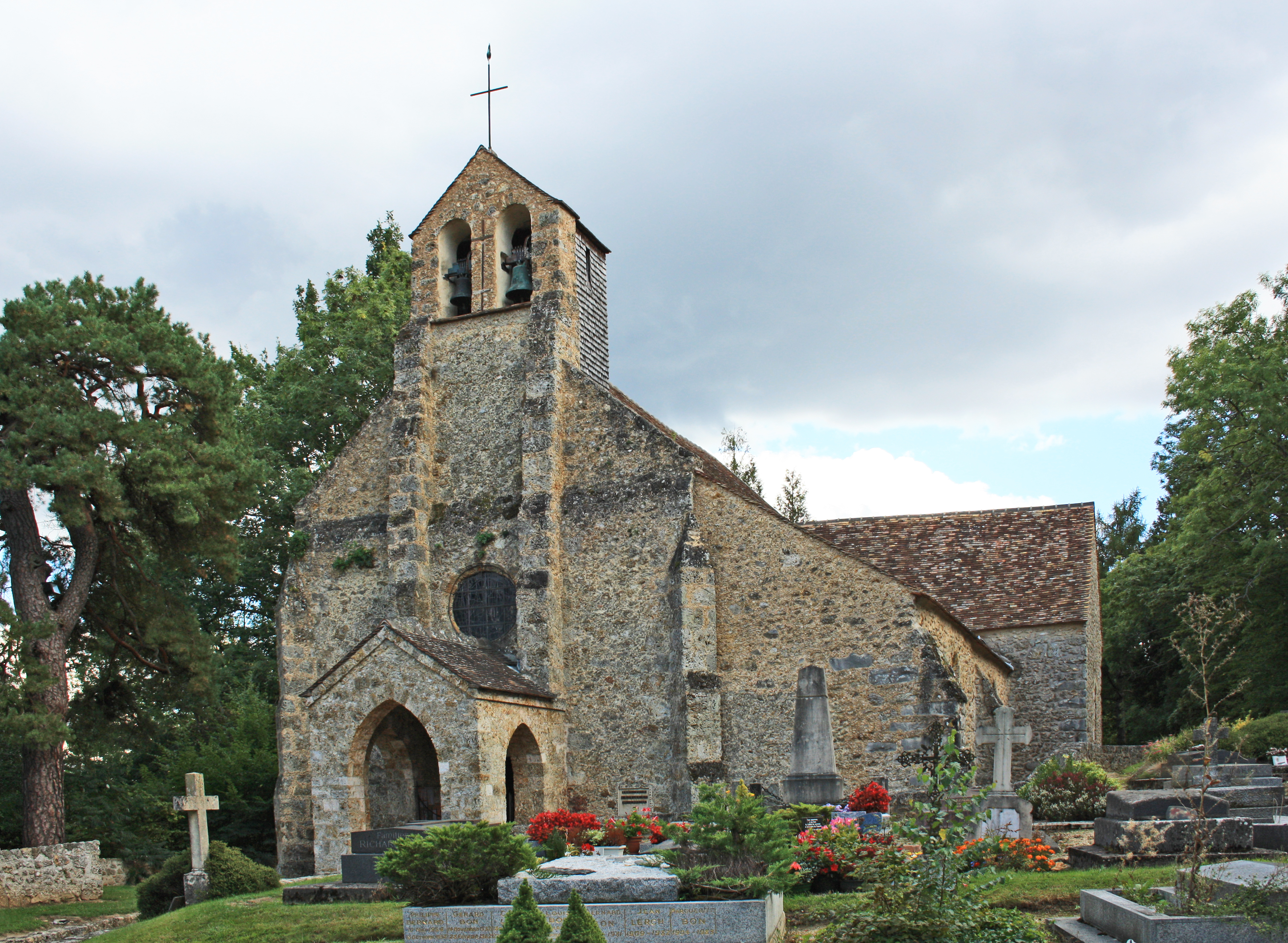
The Church of Saint-Lambert-et-Saint-Blaise, in Saint-Lambert (Yvelines), is classified as a historical monument, as are, independently, its bell on the one hand, and the cemetery on the other.

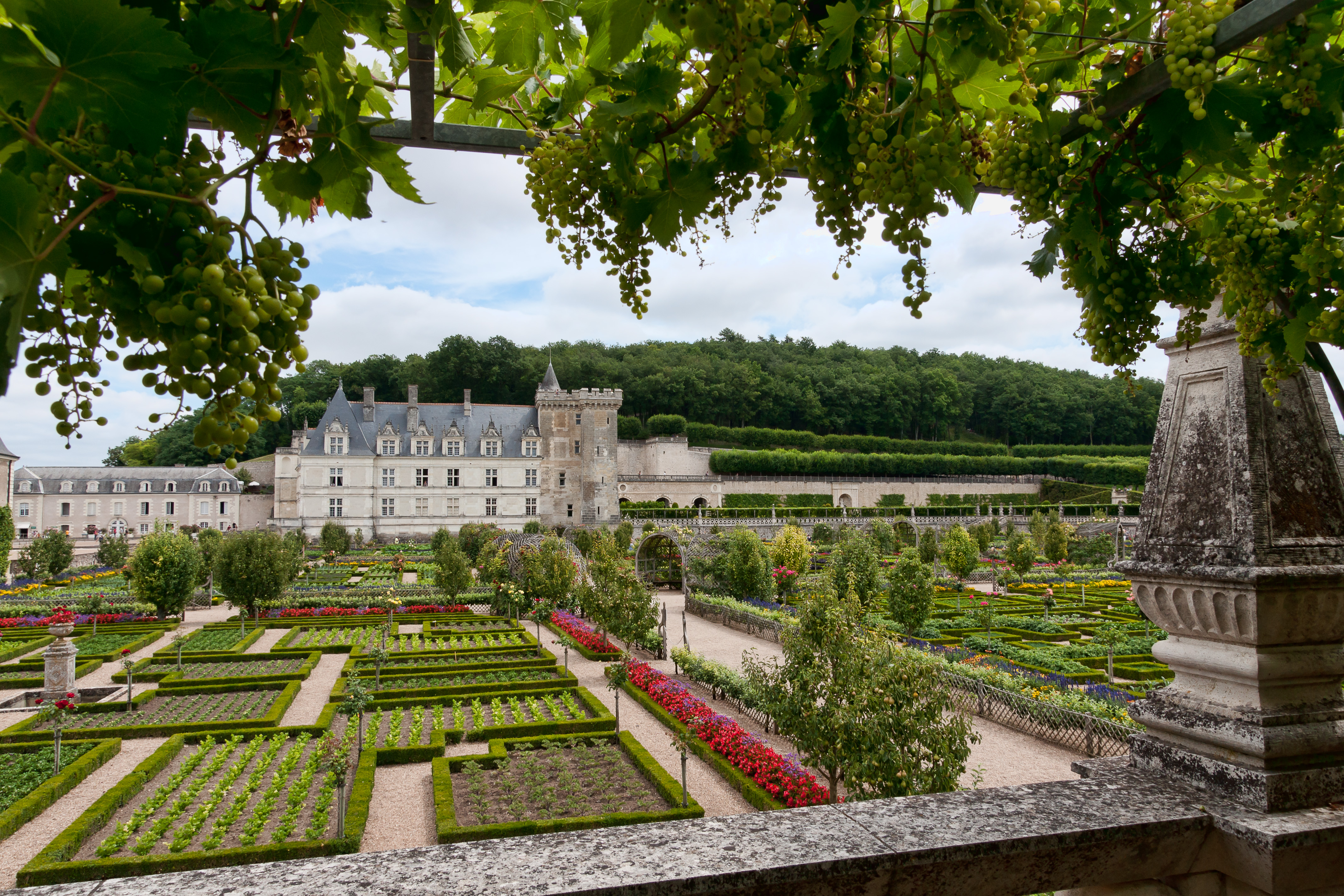
The Château de Villandry in the Indre-et-Loire departement was listed as MH in 1934.

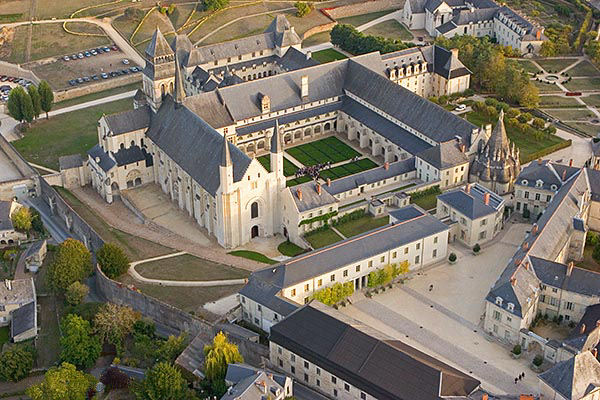
Fontevraud Abbey, founded in 1101 in Angers (Maine-et-Loire), was suppressed during the French Revolution but named one of the first monuments historiques on the 1840 list.

Considering that the heritage value and the amenity of a monument is also the "impression" that its surroundings provide, the law of 1943, amended by article 40 of the SRU law of December 2000, imposes a form of vigilance with regard to work projects in the "field of visibility" of historic monuments.

The protection of the surroundings of historic monuments is governed by the provisions of articles:

- L. 621–31 and R. 621–92 et seq. of the Heritage Code for the delimitation of their perimeter;
- L. 621–30 and following and L. 632–2 of the Heritage Code, R. 425–1 of the town planning code or L. 581–8 (advertisements) and R. 581–16 (brands) of the environment code for work in these perimeters;
- R. 621–96 et seq. of the Heritage Code for work not subject to authorization under the town planning or environmental codes.

Protecting the relationship between a building and its environment consists, depending on the case, in ensuring the quality of the interventions (facades, roofs, materials), taking care of the treatment of floors, street furniture and lighting, or even prohibiting any new construction around the monument. The servitude to protect the surroundings automatically comes into play as soon as a building is classified or registered. All modifications to the exterior appearance of buildings, new constructions, but also interventions on exterior spaces must receive the authorization of the architect of buildings of France (ABF). Advertising and signs are also under its control.

Pursuant to article L. 621–30.II of the Heritage Code, protection under the surroundings applies:

- to any building, whether built or not, located within the perimeter delimited under the conditions set out in Article L. 621–31. This perimeter may be common to several historical monuments;
- in the absence of a delimited perimeter, to any building, whether built or not, visible from the historic monument or visible at the same time as it and located less than five hundred meters from it;
- to any part not protected as historical monuments of a classified or partially protected historic monument. This provision replaced the notion of backing onto a classified building only.

In the second case, the notion of surroundings of a historic monument corresponds to that of field of visibility or covisibility and means that from a space on the ground accessible to the public the construction is visible from the monument, or that from the same point of view the two buildings are visible together, within a radius of 500 meters, from the perimeter of the protected building.

Since the SRU law, the protection perimeter corresponding to the first case can be modified (widened or narrowed), on a proposal from the architect of the buildings of France, with the agreement of the municipal council. Since the law on the freedom of creation, architecture and heritage (2016), the perimeter is established if possible after agreement of the authority (municipal or inter-municipal) competent to set the local urban plan. If no agreement is reached, the decision is taken by the Ministry of Culture. However, if the perimeter extends beyond the distance of 500 meters, a decree in Council of State is necessary.

According to article L. 621–32 of the heritage code, when a building is located in the vicinity of a building protected as historical monuments, its exterior appearance cannot be modified without prior authorization, which may take the place of those other legislations listed in article L. 632–2 of said code.

Thus, any landscape or building located in the vicinity of a historic monument is subject to specific regulations in the event of modification, which must obtain the prior agreement of the architect of the buildings of France. The latter can issue an assent, which means that the mayor is bound by this opinion, or a simple opinion if, in the case concerned, there is no covisibility. The mayor's decision is then not bound by the opinion of the architect of the buildings of France.

Article L. 632–2.II and III of the Heritage Code provides for cases of appeal by the applicant or the authority ruling on the application against the opinion of the architect of buildings in France, reminded in particular to Articles R. 424–14 and R. 423–68 of the Town Planning Code.

=== Guided tours ===
Since 8 July 2016, guided tours of a monument historique must be led by a qualified professional guide-lecturer.

Law no. 2016–925, Article 109: "Art. L. 221-1. - For the conduct of guided tours in the museums of France and historical monuments, natural or legal persons carrying out, including on an ancillary basis, the operations mentioned in I of article L. 211-1 may only use the services qualified persons holding a professional guide-lecturer card issued under conditions set by decree of the Council of State. The legal persons mentioned in III of article L. 211-18 are not subject to this obligation."

=== Specific tax regimes ===
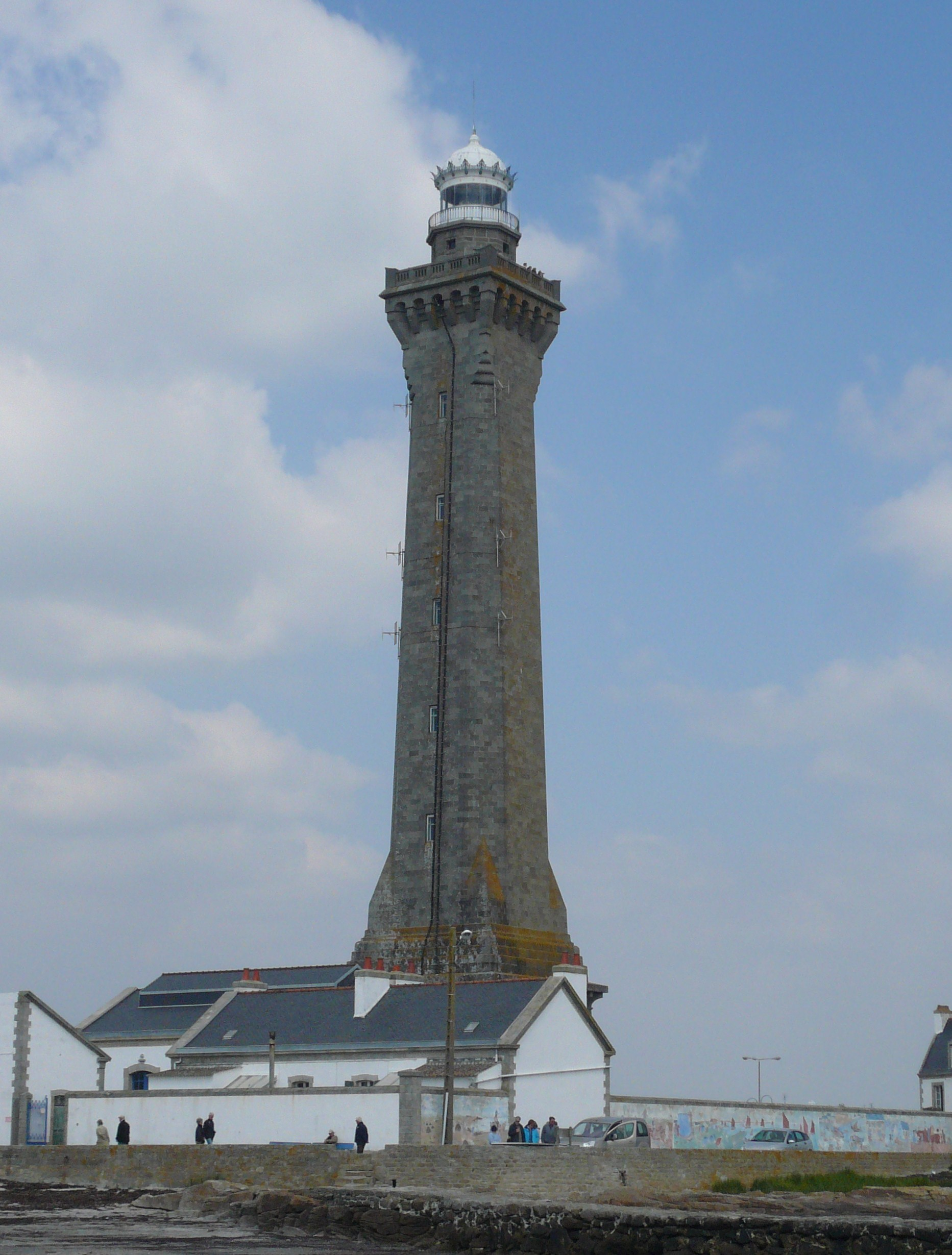
The Phare d'Eckmühl (Finistère) is one of many lighthouses relatively recently added to the list of French historic monuments as part of a recognition of France's significant maritime built environment.

The owner of a part of the French historical heritage benefits from specific tax regimes.

Regarding income tax: property charges: works, insurance, property taxes, interest on loans, etc. relating to protected parts are deductible up to 50% of taxable income. And up to 100% when the monument is open to the public or for the part of the subsidized work remaining the responsibility of the owner. The objective of the administration is to help preserve our historical heritage and to promote its safeguard.

However, if the work relates to a part of the building that is not classified or registered, the land charges are deductible only if the building is income-producing and essentially protected. The property must be kept for at least 15 years by its owner (natural person or family SCI). In the event of non-compliance with this commitment, this leads to an increase in income for the year the monument was sold and for the two following years by the amount of deductions made. Work undertaken on a classified property must always consist of restoration and not of "reconstruction". It is a question of restoring the existing one, and not of completing a work which would have disappeared with time.

Concerning inheritance or donation: historic monuments may be exempt from inheritance or donation tax. However, this exemption is not automatic, and is subject to the signing of an indefinite agreement with the Ministers of Culture and Finance including a commitment to conservation and openness to the public. The opening period is 60 days from 15 June to 15 September, or 80 days between 1 May and 30 September (including Sundays and public holidays). This exemption from inheritance tax is also granted for property owned in a company, such as family SCIs that have not opted for corporate tax.

Concerning the ISI: historical monuments are integrated into the taxable base of the ISI as was the case for the solidarity tax on wealth (ISF). However, the tax administration is tolerant as regards the estimation of these historic residences, because it must take into account the particular penalties which weigh on the owner because of the protection and the opening to the public.

== Regulations in certain overseas territories (Outre-Mer) ==
As heritage protection is not the responsibility of the state, the texts are different in New Caledonia and French Polynesia. If the classification or registration procedures are adapted to the status of each community, the other metropolitan rules are largely identical.

=== New Caledonia ===
In New Caledonia, the regulation of historical monuments is the responsibility of each province. It is fixed:

- in the North Province, by Title II of Book II of the Environmental Code of the North Province;
- in the South Province, by Chapters II and III (art. 10 to 33) of the deliberation no. 14–90 / APS of January 24, 1990, on the protection and conservation of heritage in the South Province;
- in the Loyalty Islands Province, by Chapters II and III (s. 10–33) of the resolution no. 90–66 / API of July 20, 1990, on the protection and conservation of heritage in the province of Islands.

After examination of the file and opinion of the provincial commission of sites and monuments, the classification or the inscription is pronounced by decree of the president of the province in the event of agreement of the owner, or by deliberation of the assembly of province in the case opposite.

=== French Polynesia ===
In French Polynesia, historical monuments fall of Book VI of the Code of the heritage of French Polynesia adopted by the law of the country no. 2005–10 of November 19, 2015.

After examination of the file, it is submitted to the opinion of the historical heritage commission, composed of two sections respectively for buildings and for furniture. Classification or registration is pronounced by decree taken in the Council of Ministers.

== Logo ==
Inspired by the labyrinth of the Reims Cathedral, the logo designating historic monuments can be affixed to any monument subject to protection as historical monuments. The commercial exploitation of this logo has been entrusted by the Ministry of Culture to the union of associations REMPART, which manages the manufacture of unified panels and the conditions of use of the logo on all media other than paper. Presented in 1985, it was modernized in 2017 by the Rudi Baur agency at the same time as the "remarkable heritage site" logo was created.

The logo is declined in a road ideogram coded ID16a.

Dessin du labyrinthe de la cathédrale de Reims

Idéogramme routier ID16a

== Examples ==
Examples of buildings classified as monument historique include well known Parisian structures such as the Eiffel Tower, the Louvre, and the Palais Garnier opera house, plus abbeys, churches such as Corbiac, and cathedrals such as Notre Dame de Paris or hotels such as the Crillon. Many of the Châteaux of the Loire Valley, such as Château de Montsoreau, carry the MH designation, as do the renowned gardens at Château de Villandry and the home and gardens of Claude Monet in Giverny. The scope of the monuments covered is broad enough to include individual tombs of important people, for example, Napoleon I as well as less eminent people such as Agnès Souret, the first Miss France, whose tomb is in the Basque Country.

== Comparisons to heritage registers of other nations ==
Classification of a monument historique is similar to the listing of a property onto the United States' National Register of Historic Places (NRHP). A major difference is that in France permanent restrictions are attached to a public or private building, disallowing renovations which have not received approval. In the U.S., NRHP listing imposes no such restrictions, and indeed many NRHP-listed buildings have been altered or entirely demolished by their owners, without requiring any Federal review. Depending on location, though, local governments may, however, impose restrictions on recognized historic properties through their building codes and zoning laws. NRHP listing is a "primarily an honor". Listing does provide eligibility for Federal tax subsidies for eligible restorations and for renovations that preserve historic character, and for state or local subsidies too, again depending upon the location. Also public awareness associated with a listing may contribute indirectly towards protection.

Property types eligible vary as well. Archives (collections of books and documents) were eligible for classification in France, while not ever in the U.S. Relatively smaller and more moveable items which might be allowed as monuments historiques are not eligible for NRHP listing.

== See also ==
- Centre des monuments nationaux
- List of monuments historiques in Paris
- List of heritage registers
- List of historical monuments in Savoy
- List of World Heritage Sites in France
- National Heritage Site
- Tourism in France
- Prefecture Building of Loire-Atlantique
- Saint-Laon Church, Thouars
