= José María Robles Hurtado =

Mexican Catholic priest, martyr and saint

Saint José María de Robles Hurtado
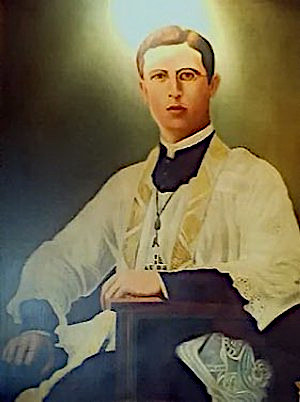

Martyr; Madman of the Sacred Heart
- Born: May 3, 1888; Mascota, Jalisco, Mexico
- Died: June 26, 1927 (aged 39); Quila, Jalisco, Mexico
- Venerated in: Roman Catholic Church
- Beatified: November 22, 1992 by Pope John Paul II
- Canonized: May 21, 2000 by Pope John Paul II
- Major shrine: Tecolotlán, Jalisco
- Feast: May 21, June 26

José María Robles Hurtado (May 3, 1888 – June 26, 1927) was a Mexican Catholic priest and one of several priests martyred during the Cristero War.

== Early life ==
He was born to the devoutly-Catholic family of Antonio Robles and Petronilla Hurtado in Mascota, Jalisco. At 12, he entered the seminary at Guadalajara. He was ordained to the priesthood at Guadalajara in 1913, at 25. A few years later, he founded the Sisters of the Sacred Heart of Jesus. He wrote a number of works to propagate the Catholic faith and also catechized others in ways contrary to the laws of the country. While serving as the pastor at a parish in Tecolotlán, he began to promote greater devotion to the Sacred Heart of Jesus through his preaching, his personal example, and his great devotion to the Eucharist. His fervency was so pronounced that he became known as the "Madman of the Sacred Heart." He was known to work tirelessly for the care of the sick in his parish, and he often spent several hours hearing confessions of his parishioners. He also worked for greater reverence to Our Lady of Guadalupe. He was a Knight of Columbus, a member of council 1979.

== Persecution ==
The Constitution of 1917 prohibited any public processions or other devotional practices. Hurtado proposed the creation of a huge cross to be placed in the geographic center of Mexico, which he said would be symbolic of how Mexico recognized Christ as its king, and he organized a public ceremony for the laying of the cornerstone of the cross in direct violation of the existing constitution.

In anticipation of the laying of the cornerstone, signs were placed throughout Mexico proclaiming Christ the "King of Mexico" and declaring the nation's devotion to the Sacred Heart. In 1923, an estimated 40,000 Roman Catholics made their way to the site of the cross to take part in the groundbreaking ceremonies at the hill, which was at the time called "La Loma" and is now called the mountain of Christ the King. After the open display of defiance, the government decided to intensify its persecution of Catholics in Mexico and to ensure that Robles, in particular, would not engage in such acts again.

Despite the increasing persecution of Catholics in general and the explicit invitations to him to leave Mexico personally, Robles remained and continued to minister to his congregation and to offer what solace he could to the survivors and families of Catholics who had been persecuted and killed by the government. Eventually, he even went further, and promoted the idea of armed defense of Catholics who were suffering from the persecution.

== Death ==
Robles Hurtado recognized the likelihood of being killed for his actions, and he wrote a poem in which he stated, "I want to love you until martyrdom." He was arrested on June 25, 1927, for saying a prayer in the home of the Agraz family, which was hiding him. He was found guilty and sentenced to be hanged from an oak tree. The next day before dawn, he was led to the tree. In a final display of compassion for his executioners, he offered them a small votive candle that he had in his pocket to help light the path to the tree on which he was to be hanged. Upon arriving there, he forgave the men for what they were about to do. He took the noose into his own hands and said "Don't dirty your hands" to the man who brought it, kissed it, and placed it around his own neck.

== Veneration ==
He was beatified by Pope John Paul II on November 22, 1992 and canonized on May 21, 2000, by Pope John Paul II, together with others involved in the Cristero War, including Cristobal Magallanes Jara, his 24 companions in martyrdom, and María de Jesús Sacramentado Venegas.

== Relics ==
On February 27, 2012, the bishop of the Roman Catholic Archdiocese of Guadalajara granted to Bishop James S. Wall of the Roman Catholic Diocese of Gallup, a first class relic for the altar in Bishop Wall's chapel. This relic was received on April 12, 2012, and is especially dear to the Diocese of Gallup because their patron is the Sacred Heart.
