= Don Francisco Javier Sauza =

- Born: December 8, 1903; Tecolotlan, Mexico
- Died: July 21, 1990 (aged 86); Guadalajara, Mexico
- Occupation: Tequila Distiller

Don Francisco Javier Sauza (December 8, 1903 – June 21, 1990) ran the Sauza Tequila business from 1946 until leading Mexican brandy producer Pedro Domecq purchased it in 1988.

== Early life ==
Francisco Javier Sauza was born in Tecolotlan, Mexico on December 8, 1903, to Don Eladio Sauza (1883 – 1946) and Doña Silveria Mora Enriquez. His grandfather, Don Cenobio, was the founder of the Sauza Tequila distillery.

== Marriage and children ==
In 1927 Francisco Javier married Doña Maria Elena “Nina” Gutierrez Salcedo, a cousin of the Cuervo family; they met while attending college in Chicago, Illinois.

They had two children:

- Sylvia Sauza (born 1932)
- Eladio Sauza (born 1937)

== Growing Sauza Tequila ==
When Javier Sauza took over Tequila Sauza, shortly before his father's death in 1946, he began plans at once to change the image of tequila from a drink of the campesinos to a refined spirit of the upper classes. His competitors scoffed when he redesigned the bottles and labels for a more tasteful look and began to age some of the tequila in wooden barrels for a smoother taste and color.

He took his product to fairs and expositions throughout Mexico, the United States, and Europe and promoted it as “the drink of romance.” He modernized production and transportation systems and built a bottling plant in Guadalajara.

In 1950, Francisco Javier added the Sauza Hornitos brand to the Sauza family of tequila. In 1963, he created Sauza Conmemorativo, a tequila that commemorated the 90th anniversary of the La Perseverancia distillery.

In 1973, to celebrate 100 years since the founding of the La Perseverancia distillery, Sauza created a specially aged tequila that he presented in a limited edition, green ceramic bottle. He called his creation Tres Generaciones in honor of the three generations that had produced Sauza Tequila: Don Cenobio, Don Eladio and Don Francisco Javier.

Traveling throughout Europe and Asia, Sauza became concerned about the number of “pseudo-tequilas” being produced. Working with other tequila producers from Jalisco Francisco lobbied President Jose Lopez Portillo saying, “Tequila is only the one made in the State of Jalisco, Mexico.” On December 9, 1974, the Label of Integrity decree stated that true tequila only came from the State of Jalisco.

== Other enterprises ==
Francisco Javier extended the entertaining work his father had done by founding a series of shows called “Noches Tapatias” which frequently featured folk singer Pedro Vargas.

== The final years ==
Francisco Javier had continued his father and grandfather's legacy, but in 1988, for personal reasons, he decided to sell the Sauza Tequila business to Mexican brandy producer Pedro Domecq. The tequilas Sauza innovated – Sauza, Hornitos, Tres Generaciones – are still in production. Today Sauza owns about 300 agave plantations and is the second largest tequila manufacturer in the world.

Francisco Javier Sauza died the evening of May 20, 1990 in Guadalajara.
