= Don Eladio =

Don Eladio may refer to:

- Don Eladio Sauza, a Mexican Tequila businessman
- Don Eladio Vuente, a fictional character in Breaking Bad and Better Call Saul
