= Thomas Peel Dunhill =

Australian surgeon (1876–1957)

Sir Thomas Peel Dunhill GCVO CMG FRACS
- Born: 3 December 1876 near Kerang, Victoria, Australia
- Died: 22 December 1957 (aged 81); Hampstead, London, England
- Military career
- Allegiance: Australia
- Branch: Australian Army
- Service years: 1906–1926
- Rank: Brigadier
- Unit: Australian Army Medical Corps
- Conflicts: First World War: Egypt; Western Front
- Awards: Knight Grand Cross of the Royal Victorian Order; Knight Commander of the Royal Victorian Order; Companion of St Michael and St George; Mentioned in Despatches (3)

Sir Thomas Peel Dunhill (3 December 1876 – 22 December 1957) was an Australian thyroid surgeon and honorary surgeon to the monarchs of the United Kingdom.

A graduate of the University of Melbourne, where he earned his Bachelor of Medicine (MB) degree in 1903 and his Doctor of Medicine (MD) degree in 1906, Dunhill worked as a surgeon at St Vincent's Hospital, Melbourne, from 1905 to 1914, where he pioneered a new, safer surgical treatment for exophthalmic goitre, a disease of the thyroid, an operation he conducted under local anaesthesia.

Dunhill joined the Australian Army Medical Corps in 1906. During the Great War he enlisted in the First Australian Imperial Force. He served in Egypt and on the Western Front with the 1st General Hospital and in July 1918 was appointed consulting surgeon to the Rouen area in France. He was thrice mentioned in despatches and made a Companion of the Order of St Michael and St George in 1919.

After the war he worked at St Bartholomew's Hospital in London. He became a Knight Commander of the Royal Victorian Order in 1933, a fellow of the Royal Australasian College of Surgeons in 1930, and an honorary fellow of the Royal College of Surgeons of England in 1939. He was the first surgeon still in active surgical practice in England to receive this honour.

== Early life ==
Thomas Peel Dunhill was born at Tragowel, a grazing property near Kerang, Victoria, on 3 December 1876. He was the oldest of two sons of John Webster Dunhill, an overseer on a cattle station, and Mary Elizabeth Dunhill née Peel. He had a younger brother, John Webster Dunhill. His father died from typhoid fever on 19 April 1878, and the family moved to his mother's home town of Inverleigh, Victoria, where Thomas attended Inverleigh State School. On 29 May 1888 his mother married William Lawry, and the family moved to Daylesford, Victoria, where Lawry managed a gold mine, and Thomas completed his secondary education at Daylesford Grammar School.

Dunhill passed the entrance examinations of the University of Melbourne in English, Geometry, Arithmetic, Greek and French, but did not study Latin, which was a prerequisite for medicine. He took a course in pharmacy. Each day he worked as an apprentice in a chemist shop in Daylesford. After work he caught the train to Ballarat, Victoria, for evening lectures at the Ballarat School of Mines. At 02:30 he would walk to Ballarat Railway Station and catch the 03:00 train back to Daylesford and open the shop at 08:00. He passed his final qualifying examination at the Victorian College of Pharmacy on 11 March 1898, and was registered as a pharmacist on 11 June. He opened his own chemist shop in Rochester, Victoria.

Charles Martin, the professor of physiology at the University of Melbourne influenced a decision by Dunhill to pursue a career in medicine. He studied Latin and passed the subject in 1896. He disposed of his business, and entered the University of Melbourne in 1899, becoming a resident of Ormond College. He published his first paper in 1902. He graduated from the clinical school at Melbourne Hospital with his Bachelor of Medicine (MB) degree in December 1903, with three first-class honours and exhibitions in medicine and in obstetrics and gynaecology, and was appointed house physician to Henry Carr Maudsley at the Melbourne Hospital. He became a tutor in medicine at Ormond College, and was for some years a lecturer in materia medica and an instructor in clinical surgery at the University of Melbourne.

Despite his achievements, Dunhill's career prospects at Melbourne Hospital were dim, as he was a country boy with no social connections in Melbourne. Charles Martin and Harry Allen, the professor of pathology at the University of Melbourne, were advisors to Anne Daly (Mother Mary Berchmans), the rectress of St Vincent's Hospital, Melbourne, and they persuaded her to extend an invitation to Dunhill to join her staff. There were no surgical vacancies at the time, but he became a physician to outpatients. He was awarded his Doctor of Medicine (MD) degree in September 1906 and became a surgeon to St Vincent's outpatients.

== Early career ==
Dunhill became interested in the treatment of exophthalmic goitre, a disease of the thyroid for which there were few treatments at the time. When he was a surgical resident at Melbourne Hospital, he had witnessed surgeon William Moore operate on two toxic multinodular goitre patients under chloroform general anaesthesia; both died. Toxic goitre patients frequently entered the hospital emaciated and sometimes blind, and often succumbed to cardiac arrest or hyperpyrexia. Various other treatments were tried, including sodium phosphate, sodium chloride, ergot, belladonna, morphia and bromides, all without any effect. At St Vincent's, patients were given the milk of goats from which the thyroid had been surgically removed. The goats were kept in a pen on the hospital grounds, and Dunhill tended them, milking them each morning, and taking the milk to his patients. While some patients showed improvement, he came to regard the treatment as unsatisfactory.

On 25 March 1907, a 36-year-old woman, Mary Lynch, with an advanced stage of toxic goitre was admitted. She was an outpatient who had been treated for thyrotoxicosis. She did not respond to treatments, and Dunhill decided that surgery was required. He always stressed the importance of gaining the patient's confidence before an operation, especially if they were frightened, and he became known for his sympathy as well as his surgery. Lynch understood that an operation would be very risky, but felt that her quality of life was such that she was willing to take the chance. A conventional operation using a general anaesthesia was ruled out, so on 30 July 1907, with the assistance of his chief, Murray Morton, Dunhill removed the right lobe of her thyroid under local anaesthesia using eucaine and adrenaline. At the conclusion of the operation, Lynch got up from the operating table and walked back to her bed. She was discharged from the hospital on 15 August. She subsequently relapsed, and most of the remaining lobe of her thyroid was removed in March 1908. This cured her thyrotoxicosis. She was able to work again, and became a cook at a Victorian country hotel.

Dunhill went on to perform thyroidectomies on patients who were suffering from cardiac failure as a result of a hyperactive thyroid. At the time, thyroidectomies were seldom performed, partly because the mortality rate for surgery performed for exophthalmic goitre at St Thomas’s Hospital in London in 1910 was 33 per cent, whereas that for patients treated without surgery was 25 per cent. Dunhill's achievement was to pioneer a safer way to perform the procedure. The use of local anaesthesia removed the danger of nausea and vomiting that often accompanied the use of chloroform, and patients could drink water immediately afterwards, reducing the risk of dehydration. Instead of using a scalpel and forceps, he dislocated the thyroid gland with a blunt dissection using his fingers, and dissected the vascular pedicles early on in the procedure, thereby minimising blood loss. He published his first paper on the procedure later that year. By 1910 he had performed 312 thyroid operations, with a mortality rate of 1.5 per cent, and had become renowned as an expert on what is now known as Hartley-Dunhill resection.

Along with Hugh Devine and Anne Daly, he was instrumental in St Vincent's becoming a clinical school in conjunction with the University of Melbourne in 1910. Devine and Dunhill became the first tutors at the new clinical school. That year Devine and Dunhill assisted Douglas Shields when he operated on the Countess of Dudley, the wife of William Ward, 2nd Earl of Dudley, the Governor-General of Australia, to remove a stone that had lodged in her ureter. The operation, which was successful, was performed in the ballroom of Government House, which had been converted into a makeshift operating theatre.

In 1911 Dunhill travelled to Britain and the United States. In Britain he went to Leeds to see Berkeley Moynihan operate, and to Edinburgh to see Harold Stiles. In the United States he visited Howard Kelly, Harvey Cushing, George Washington Crile, William Halsted and the Mayo brothers. Halsted, Crile and Charles Mayo adopted his procedure. He then returned to the UK, where, on 13 February 1912, he delivered a paper at the Royal Society of Medicine in London outlining his surgical treatment of exophthalmic goitre.

When Dunhill returned to Australia later that year, he became the surgeon to in-patients at St Vincent's and the chairman of the medical staff in succession to Shields, who left for the UK. On 12 February 1914, he married a widow, Edith Florence McKellar née Affleck at Scots Church in St Kilda, Victoria, in a ceremony conducted by Alexander Yule. They had no children together, but she had a son and a daughter from her first marriage.

== Great War ==
On 1 January 1906, Dunhill was appointed a provisional captain in the Australian Army Medical Corps (AAMC); his rank was confirmed on 9 February 1907. Following the outbreak of the Great War, he enlisted in the First Australian Imperial Force (AIF). He was commissioned as a major on 19 October 1914, and assigned to the 1st General Hospital. He departed Melbourne for Egypt on the Kyarra on 5 December 1914. On 10 March 1915, he was admitted to hospital with tonsillitis and nephritis. Personnel not expected to recover from illness or wounds within a few weeks were returned from Egypt to Australia. He reached Melbourne on the RMS Medina on 8 February 1916, where his AIF appointment was terminated on 25 February 1916.

Dunhill made his way back to the UK, and on 24 April 1917, he left London and proceeded to France via Folkestone. He was reappointed to the AIF with the temporary rank of lieutenant colonel on 1 September 1917, and rejoined the 1st General Hospital. On 14 July 1918, he was appointed consulting surgeon to the Rouen area in France with the temporary rank of colonel. The concept of the consulting surgeon arose from the difficulties experienced in tracking casualties as they proceeded from one hospital to the next along the chain of evacuation, and the problem of how to diffuse experience among otherwise isolated hospitals and base medical units. The consultants familiarised themselves with the work of the medical units in their area, and made recommendations on promotions and transfers. They observed how treatments were performed and advised the hospitals on the treatments and the management of cases. They became a conduit through which knowledge acquired from one unit or area was disseminated to others.

Dunhill's rank of colonel became substantive on 18 March 1919. He returned to the UK on 25 April 1919. He was given permission to return to Australia via the United States at his own expense, and reached Australia again on the RMS Niagara on 14 August 1919. He was promoted to the rank of major in the AAMC on 1 July 1919, and colonel on 24 January 1920. He was transferred to the unattached list on 1 July 1920, and then to the AAMC reserve on 1 September 1926. For his services, Dunhill was thrice mentioned in despatches, and made a Companion of St Michael and St George in the 1919 Birthday Honours.

== Later life ==
During the war, Dunhill had met eminent British surgeons, including George Gask, the consulting surgeon of the British Fourth Army. After the war ended, Gask was appointed the professor in charge of the surgical unit at St Bartholomew's Hospital in London, and he invited Dunhill to become his assistant director. The position was a part-time one, with a salary of £900 (equivalent to £34,779 in 2025) per annum, and Dunhill had to agree to stay for a minimum of five years. Dunhill had no surgery degree, only his MD from the University of Melbourne, but Gask waived this requirement. Despite his lack of a qualification, Geoffrey Keynes, who assisted him at St Bartholomew's found that Dunhill was an expert in all fields of surgery. In London, Dunhill felt ill at ease in unfamiliar surroundings, and many British physicians and surgeons were sceptical of his thyroid technique. Mortality was indeed slightly higher in the UK than in Australia, but this was because doctors clung to the old treatments, and patients referred for surgery tended to be in more advances stages of the disease. He established a Thyroid Clinic in 1931, at New End Hospital for the treatment of patients with toxic goitre and myasthenia gravis. He retired from St Bartholomew's in 1935, but continued his private practice at 54 Harley Street. That year he paid a visit to Australia.

In 1930 Dunhill became a fellow of the Royal Australasian College of Surgeons and in 1939 an honorary fellow of the Royal College of Surgeons of England. He was the first surgeon still in active surgical practice in England to receive this honour. He was appointed Serjeant Surgeon to the Royal Household on 3 April 1928, and on 9 May 1930 he became honorary surgeon to King George V in succession to Alfred Downing Fripp. He subsequently became honorary surgeon to King Edward VIII on 20 July 1936, King George VI on 2 March 1937, and Queen Elizabeth II on 5 August 1952. He was created a Knight Commander of the Royal Victorian Order in the 1933 Birthday Honours. On 1 January 1940, during the Second World War, he was appointed a part-time consulting surgeon to the Second AIF, with the rank of brigadier. He performed a hernia operation on Winston Churchill on 11 June 1947. Two years later he stopped performing operations. He told people that he had only three patients left: the King, Queen Mary, and Winston Churchill. He was in attendance when the King died in 1952. He was elevated to Knight Grand Cross of the Royal Victorian Order on 3 May 1949.

Dunhill's wife died on 31 July 1942. He had insomnia, and had an easel in his living room where he would do elaborate embroideries when he could not sleep. His mother came to live with him in 1929 after being widowed a second time. She died on 28 June 1946. He sold the house at 54 Harley Street and bought a country house in Hampstead he called "Tragowel". He visited Australia for the last time in 1950. In his final years he had haemochromatosis. He died at Tragowel on 22 December 1957. In a memorial lecture, Keynes said:

Though he was the least pushful and self-seeking of men, he came to be greatly trusted in the highest quarters. He was a perfectionist in ordinary life as in surgery. He applied his mind with the same zeal to his pastimes, whether they were fishing, gardening, or the furnishing of his house with choice pieces of antique craftsmanship. He lived his life with intensity, and I do not think I have exaggerated in my estimate of the degree to which he influenced surgery in England in the years 1920 to 1940. He was the true pioneer in the surgery of toxic goitre and his place in the Temple of History cannot be denied.
