= Prides =

Scottish indie band

- Origin: Glasgow, Scotland
- Genres: Indie rock ∙ pop ∙ electropop ∙ indie pop
- Years active: 2013–present
- Labels: Island, Virgin, Twin Music Inc
- Members: Stewart Brock Callum Wiseman Lewis Gardiner
- Website: prides.bandcamp.com

Prides are a Scottish indie band formed in Glasgow in 2013 and made up of Stewart Brock (lead vocals, keys), Callum Wiseman (guitar, keys, vocals), and Lewis Gardiner (drums, production). They released their debut album The Way Back Up on 10 July 2015.

== Career ==
The band performed at the 2014 Commonwealth Games closing ceremony in Glasgow with the track "Messiah" on 3 August 2014.

The band are managed by Ally McCrae and signed to Twin Music Inc.

Their song "Out of the Blue" is featured in FIFA 15.

== Members ==
- Stewart Brock – lead vocals, keys
- Callum Wiseman - guitar, keys, vocals [No Longer a Member]
- Lewis Gardiner - drums, production [No Longer a Member]

== Discography ==
=== Albums ===
- The Way Back Up (2015) #24 UK
- A Mind Like the Tide, Pt. 1 (Mini-LP) (2017)
- A Mind Like the Tide, Pt. 2 (Mini-LP) (2018)

=== Singles ===
- "The Seeds You Sow" (2014)
- "I Should Know You Better" (2014)
- "Out of the Blue" (2014)
- "Messiah" (2014)
- "Higher Love" (2015)
- "Rome" (2016)
- "Are You Ready" (2016)
- "Tinseltown in the Rain" (2016)
- "It Must Have Been Love" (2017)
- "Away with the Night" (2017)
- "What's Love Got to Do with It" (2017)
- "Let's Stay in Bed All Day" (2017)
- "Born To Be Whole" (2018)
- "Say It Again" (2018)
- "Brand New Start" (2025)
- "Dynamite" (2025)
- "Fighting Sleep" (2025)

== Media ==
- In 2013, the music featured in an advertisement for Sourz drinks was composed specifically by Prides.
- They sang "Messiah" in the closing ceremony of the 2014 Commonwealth Games on 3 August and has featured in a number of TV shows including Taking New York.
- Their single "Out of the Blue" was featured in EA-game FIFA 15, and was used in adverts for RBS.
- Their cover of "What's Love Got to Do with It" was featured in the 15th episode of the first season of Dynasty.

== See also ==
- List of bands from Glasgow
- List of Scottish musicians
