= Jenaro Sánchez Delgadillo =

Mexican Catholic priest, martyr and saint

Saint Jenaro Sánchez y Delgadillo
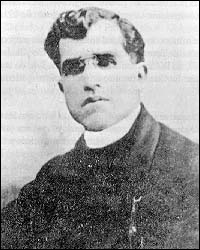
- Jenaro Sánchez Delgadillo

Priest and martyr
- Born: 19 September 1886; Agualele, Zapopan, Jalisco, Mexico
- Died: 17 January 1927 (aged 40); La Loma, outside of Tecolotlán, Jalisco, Mexico
- Venerated in: Roman Catholic Church (Mexico)
- Beatified: 22 November 1992 by Pope John Paul II
- Canonized: 21 May 2000 by Pope John Paul II
- Major shrine: Church of St. Michael the Archangel, Cocula, Jalisco, Mexico
- Feast: 21 May

Jenaro Sánchez y Delgadillo was a Mexican Catholic priest who was executed by the Mexican military during the Cristero War in that country, born on 19 September 1886 and died on 17 January 1927. He is now honored as a martyr and saint by the Catholic Church.

== Life ==
Sánchez Delgadillo was born in the town of Agualele, in the municipality of Zapopan, Jalisco, the son of Cristóbal Sánchez and Julia Delgadillo, on 19 September 1886. With a scholarship, he entered the seminary of the Archdiocese of Guadalajara and was later ordained a priest of the Archdiocese by Archbishop José de Jesús Ortíz y Rodríguez on 20 August 1911.

Sánchez then served as a curate in various parishes of the Archdiocese, becoming known for his humility and his obedience to the pastors under whom he served. The care of the sick was a major focus of his ministry, as well as teaching the catechism to the children of the parish. When he was stationed in Cocula, Jalisco, he taught classes at a minor seminary established within the parish.

As a result of the increasing tension between the Catholic Church and the government of Mexico, in 1917 the Archbishop of Guadalajara, Francisco Orozco y Jiménez, issued a pastoral letter on behalf of the bishops of Mexico—most of whom were then in exile in the United States—in which he detailed the sufferings he was enduring for defending the rights of the Church against government interference. For reading this letter publicly at the Sunday service in his church, Sánchez was jailed by the local police.

In 1923 Sánchez was appointed as the vicar of the village of Tamazulita, within the parish of Tecolotlan. Due to the prohibition of public worship by the Republic of Mexico, Sánchez conducted secret Masses in private homes. He and his parents were given shelter by the Castillo family at their home at Rancho La Cañada. On 17 January 1927, he was out hunting with Herculano, Crescenciano and Cresencio Castillo, Lucio Camacho and Ricardo Brambila. Soldiers were waiting for him. Though everyone said he should escape, he decided to stay and face the consequences. The soldiers took them prisoner and tied everyone back to back. The others were released but the soldiers hanged Sánchez from a nearby tree.

Before dawn, the soldiers returned shot Sánchez in the left shoulder and then lowered the body to the ground. One of the soldiers then pierced his chest with a bayonet. Sánchez' body was then taken to a private home from which it was buried in the cemetery of Tecolotlan.

In 1934, with the approval of the Curia of Guadalajara, the remains were transferred to the parish church in Tecolotlan Cocula, Jalisco. He was beatified on 22 November 1992 by John Paul II and canonized by that same pope at the Jubilee of 2000, on 21 May of that year.

== Sources ==
1. San Jenaro Sánchex por la Archidiócesis de Puebla
2. San Jenaro por Misión Guadalupana
3. San Jenaro por Aciprensa
4. San Jenaro Sánchez Delgadillo
