= Quila =

Quila may refer to:

- Chusquea quila, a species of bamboo
- Quila, Jalisco
