= VTuber Legend =

Japanese light novel series and its adaptations

- VTuber Legend: How I Went Viral After Forgetting to Turn Off My Stream
- First light novel volume cover, featuring Awayuki Kokorone

VTuberなんだが配信切り忘れたら伝説になってた (Buichūbā Nanda ga Haishin Kiriwasuretara Densetsu ni Natteta)
- Genre: Comedy; Slice of life; Yuri
- Novel series
- Written by: Nana Nanato
- Published by: Hameln; Kakuyomu
- Original run: June 22, 2020 – present
- Light novel
- Written by: Nana Nanato
- Illustrated by: Siokazunoko
- Published by: Fujimi Shobo
- English publisher: NA: J-Novel Club
- Imprint: Fujimi Fantasia Bunko
- Original run: May 20, 2021 – February 20, 2025
- Volumes: 10
- Manga
- Written by: Nana Nanato
- Illustrated by: Roto Fujisaki
- Published by: Kadokawa Shoten
- Imprint: Kadokawa Comics A
- Magazine: Comp Ace
- Original run: August 25, 2023 – present
- Volumes: 1
- Anime television series
- Directed by: Takuya Asaoka
- Written by: Deko Akao
- Music by: Masato Suzuki; Tsubasa Handa
- Studio: TNK
- Licensed by: Crunchyroll; EA/SEA: Medialink
- Original network: AT-X, Tokyo MX, KBS, SUN, BS NTV
- Original run: July 7, 2024 – September 22, 2024
- Episodes: 12
- icon

VTuber Legend: How I Went Viral After Forgetting to Turn Off My Stream, (Note: Japanese: VTuberなんだが配信切り忘れたら伝説になってた, Hepburn: Buichūbā Nanda ga Haishin Kiriwasuretara Densetsu ni Natteta) or VDen (Note: Japanese: ぶいでん, Hepburn: BuiDen) for short, is a Japanese light novel series written by Nana Nanato and illustrated by Siokazunoko. The series originated on the novel posting websites Hameln and Kakuyomu in 2020, before being published in ten volumes under Fujimi Shobo's Fujimi Fantasia Bunko light novel imprint from May 2021 to February 2025. The series is licensed in English by J-Novel Club. A manga adaptation by Roto Fujisaki began serialization in Kadokawa Shoten's Comp Ace magazine in August 2023. An anime television series adaptation produced by TNK aired from July to September 2024.

== Plot ==
Awayuki Kokorone is a third generation VTuber of Live-On who is struggling to catch up to the success of her fellow third generation colleagues. One night, she inadvertently showcases her unrefined side when she forgets to turn off her stream. As a result, she goes viral and experiences a sudden wave of popularity. Awayuki is determined to handle this newfound success alongside the rest of Live-On.

== Characters ==
Awayuki Kokorone (心音 淡雪, Kokorone Awayuki)
Voiced by: Ayane Sakura (Japanese); Hayden Daviau (English)
The protagonist of the series, who is part of the third generation of VTubers under Live-On. Originally portraying herself as ladylike, she becomes popular after unintentionally showing her unrefined side to her viewers while drinking due to not turning off her livestream. Her unrefined side has been affectionally nicknamed by her viewers as Shuwa-chan (シュワちゃん), which she adopts as her alternate persona. She is fond of Strong Zero chūhai. She is also openly a lesbian and expresses extreme erotic interest in her gen-mates, notably with Mashiro Irodori. She did not have a good relationship with her parents, who died in an accident shortly after she moved to Tokyo. Her real name is Yuki Tanaka (田中 雪, Tanaka Yuki).
Sei Utsuki (宇月 聖, Utsuki Sei)
Voiced by: Yū Kobayashi (Japanese); Morgan Berry (English)
A Live-On talent who is part of its second generation and specializes in racy content such as streaming eroge. She is a lesbian, and is openly dating Shion Kaminari. Her real name is Seira Kaburagi (鏑木 聖羅, Kaburagi Seira).
Mashiro Irodori (彩 ましろ, Irodori Mashiro)
Voiced by: Saku Mizuno (Japanese); Sarah Wiedenheft (English)
A Live-On talent who is part of its third generation and is the illustrator for Awayuki. She is close to Awayuki and has feelings for her. Her real name is Haku Sakurabi (桜火 白, Sakurabi Haku).
Hikari Matsuriya (祭屋 光, Matsuriya Hikari)
Voiced by: Machico (Japanese); Kristin Sutton (English)
A Live-On talent who is part of its third generation and specializes in gaming endurance streams. Her real name is Natsumi Sasaki (佐々木 夏海, Sasaki Natsumi).
Chami Yanagase (柳瀬 ちゃみ, Yanagase Chami)
Voiced by: Sayaka Kikuchi (Japanese); Hannah Alyea (English)
A Live-On talent who is part of its third generation and specializes in ASMR streams. Her VTuber persona has a tomboyish appearance. She is fond of relaxing in bathrooms due to easily becoming nervous. Her real name is Michiru Fujita (藤田 みちる, Fujita Michiru).
Shion Kaminari (神成 シオン, Kaminari Shion)
Voiced by: Sumire Morohoshi (Japanese); Diane Meo (English)
A Live-On talent who is part of its second generation and organizes collaboration streams between her colleagues. She is currently in a relationship with Sei Utsuki. Her real name is Shiori Ichinose (一ノ瀬 詩織, Ichinose Shiori).
Nekoma Hirune (昼寝 ネコマ, Hirune Nekoma)
Voiced by: Ayaka Ōhashi (Japanese); Hannah Magers (English)
A Live-On talent who is part of its second generation and specializes in introducing and streaming kusoge. Her real name is Rin Suzunari (鈴鳴 凛, Suzunari Rin).
Hareru Asagiri (朝霧 晴, Asagiri Hareru)
Voiced by: Yoko Hikasa (Japanese); Madeleine Morris (English)
A Live-On talent who is the sole member of its first generation and is revered by her colleagues as the face of the agency, though her eccentricity can overwhelm first-time collaborators. Her real name is Hinata Mogami (最上 日向, Mogami Hinata).
Alice Sōma (相馬 有素, Sōma Arisu)
Voiced by: Azusa Tadokoro (Japanese); Ciarán Strange (English)
A Live-On talent who is part of its fourth generation and holds a deep overwhelming adoration for Awayuki. Her real name is Ayumi Itsukushima (厳島 歩, Itsukushima Ayumi).
Eirai Sonokaze (苑風 エーライ, Sonokaze Eirai)
Voiced by: M.A.O (Japanese); Corey Pettit (English)
A Live-On talent who is part of its fourth generation and has a knack of sharing both informative and vulgar animal trivia. Her real name is Asuka Yamaguchi (山口 飛鳥, Yamaguchi Asuka).
Kaeru Yamatani (山谷 還, Yamatani Kaeru)
Voiced by: Ai Kayano (Japanese); Taylor Murphy (English)
A Live-On talent who is part of its fourth generation, wants to be treated like a baby, and dislikes working. Her real name is Kanade Shinonome (東雲 奏, Shinonome Kanade).

== Media ==
=== Light novel ===
The series is written by Nana Nanato and illustrated by Siokazunoko. It originated as a web novel published on the Hameln novel website on June 22, 2020, then also on the Kakuyomu website on August 4, 2020. It was later acquired by Fujimi Shobo, who published the series in ten volumes under their Fujimi Fantasia Bunko light novel imprint from May 20, 2021, to February 20, 2025. In March 2022, J-Novel Club announced that they had licensed the series for English publication.

No.	Original release date	Original ISBN	English release date	English ISBN
1	May 20, 2021	978-4-04-074111-6	May 30, 2022	978-1-71-838698-3
2	September 18, 2021	978-4-04-074294-6	October 17, 2022	978-1-71-838700-3
3	January 20, 2022	978-4-04-074401-8	January 23, 2023	978-1-71-838702-7
4	May 20, 2022	978-4-04-074402-5	March 27, 2023	978-1-71-838704-1
5	September 16, 2022	978-4-04-074690-6	July 10, 2023	978-1-71-838706-5
6	January 20, 2023	978-4-04-074692-0	October 16, 2023	978-1-71-838708-9
7	June 20, 2023	978-4-04-074982-2	August 19, 2024	978-1-71-838710-2
8	November 17, 2023	978-4-04-075231-0	February 3, 2025	978-1-71-838714-0
9	July 20, 2024	978-4-04-075529-8	May 12, 2025	978-1-71-838714-0
10	February 20, 2025	978-4-04-075625-7	May 7, 2026	978-1-71-838716-4
11	January 20, 2027	978-4-04-076446-7		

=== Manga ===
A manga adaptation was announced in June 2021. Handled by Roto Fujisaki, it began serialization in Kadokawa Shoten's Comp Ace magazine on August 25, 2023. As of June 2024, a single tankōbon volume has been released.

No.	Japanese release date	Japanese ISBN
1	June 25, 2024	978-4-04-114736-8

=== Anime ===
An anime television series adaptation was announced in January 2023. It was produced by TNK and directed by Takuya Asaoka, with scripts written by Deko Akao, character designs handled by Reina Iwasaki, and makes use of Live2D, with Live2D design handled by Live2D Creative Studio, Live2D direction handled by Live2D Juku Online School and Live2D motion tracker handled by Nizima Live, as well as Live2D Cubism (episode 2 only), Clip Studio Paint and OBS Studio. The series aired from July 7 to September 22, 2024, on AT-X and other networks. The opening theme song is "Virtual Showtime!" (バーチャル・ショータイム！) performed by Awayuki Kokorone and Shuwa-chan (both voiced by Ayane Sakura), while each episode features a different ending theme song performed by its cast. Crunchyroll streamed the series worldwide except East Asia. Medialink licensed the series in East, Southeast Asia and Oceania (except Australia and New Zealand) for streaming on its Ani-One Asia YouTube channel.

==== Episodes ====
No.	Title	Directed by	Written by	Storyboarded by	Ending theme song	Original release date
1	"Episode 1"	Ryo Okubo	Deko Akao	Takuya Asaoka	"Champagne ni Narikirenai Watashi o" (シャンパンになりきれない私を) by Awayuki Kokorone (Ayane Sakura)	July 7, 2024
Awayuki Kokorone, a VTuber affiliated with Live-On who presents herself as ladylike, starts a livestream and begins to wrap up a few minutes later. Unbeknownst to her, she does not shut off the stream, giving viewers a glimpse to a candid and unreserved Awayuki who drinks and blurts out obscene remarks as she drunkenly watches her colleagues' streams, much to their delight. As she wakes up from a hangover, Awayuki is horrified to learn her livestream antics became a trending topic. She is, however, encouraged by Live-On manager Suzuki to take advantage of the newfound appeal, and Awayuki, reflecting on her slow channel growth, takes it in stride, setting up a collaboration with colleagues Sei Utsuki and Shion Kaminari.
2	"Episode 2"	Ryo Okubo	Deko Akao	Takuya Asaoka	"Otoko to Onna no Love Game" (男と女のラブゲーム) by Awayuki Kokorone (Ayane Sakura) & Sei Utsuki (Yū Kobayashi)	July 14, 2024
Awayuki collaborates with her illustrator Mashiro Irodori, who takes surprise in seeing her candid side and nicknames it Shuwa-chan, as they read viewer-submitted questions. Awayuki also promises to Mashiro on holding alcohol-free days as they preview a new Live2D outfit for Awayuki to use. She is later roped in to an impromptu collaboration with Sei and Shion as they read questions and participate in karaoke sessions. After the collaboration, Awayuki recounts how discovering and applying for Live-On made her break out from being overworked at a black company before heading home to stream a game, where she becomes enraged with its gameplay and breaks her microphone.
3	"Episode 3"	Shiho Takahashi	Inaho Fujio	Shiho Takahashi	"Sweet Magic" (スイートマジック) by Hikari Matsuriya (Machico)	July 21, 2024
Live-On colleague Chami Yanagase calls Awayuki and offers her a microphone replacement and an invitation to visit her house. Awayuki agrees to the offer and visits her, where she realizes Chami is shy and nervous, and they start an offline collaboration stream soon after where Chami asks her for advice on socializing. Later on, Awayuki starts a stream, revealing her new outfit for her Shuwa-chan persona and celebrating on getting monetized, and begins taking call-ins from her colleagues. Nekoma Hirune enters the call, though Awayuki hears the voice of Hareru Asagiri and assumes Nekoma is impersonating her, so she entertains “Hareru” with absurd collaboration ideas but she agrees to all of them to her shock and leaves. Nekoma rejoins the call, revealing she and Hareru pranked her, and Awayuki realizes to her horror Hareru was actually agreeing to her ideas.
4	"Episode 4"	Ryo Okubo	Mini Izumi	Kahoru Fujiki	"Live Start" (ライブスタート) by Live-On Cast	July 28, 2024
Awayuki purchases a Long Fit for a fitness game stream, where she gets exposed for never exercising and struggles to keep up with the increasing difficulty of the exercises. She then transitions into her Shuwa-chan persona to alleviate the pain and watches her colleagues' streams and is left continuously surprised with their eccentricities. The next day, Awayuki heads to the studio to record her parts for a music video with Live-On and meets some of her colleagues in person for the first time, including Hareru, leaving Awayuki stunned; Live-On later premieres the music video, and Awayuki commemorates it by announcing a fourth generation of Live-On talents will be revealed soon.
5	"Episode 5"	Hodaka Kuramoto	Matsuryou Aka	Takuya Asaoka	"Odoru Akachan Ningen" (踊る赤ちゃん人間) by Kaeru Yamatani (Ai Kayano)	August 4, 2024
Awayuki begins to watch the debut livestreams of the fourth generation and looks forward to being a good role model to the juniors. She then realizes all of its members are as eccentric as the rest of Live-On, shattering her initial hopes of them being normal. After coming off from a collaboration with Mashiro, Awayuki gets a call from Suzuki that one of the fourth-generation members, Alice Sōma, has been sending requests for a collaboration, unnerving Awayuki due to Alice’s deep adoration for her. She reluctantly agrees, and Awayuki becomes overwhelmed with Alice’s dedication to her as the latter analyzes her accidental drunk livestream, making Awayuki cringe at her past self.
6	"Episode 6"	Takahiko Usui	Matsuryou Aka	Kahoru Fujiki	"Futatsu no Hoshi" (ふたつの星) by Shion Kaminari (Sumire Morohoshi) & Sei Utsuki (Yū Kobayashi)	August 11, 2024
Shion invites Awayuki as a special guest to her highlight stream after seeing her banter during a game show stream hosted by Eirai Sonokaze. She heads to Shion's house, where she becomes unnerved with Shion's motherly nature and is forced to roleplay as a baby. They then proceed to host the highlight stream, taking part in banter as they review the clips of the week from their colleagues. Shion thanks Awayuki on joining and she comments how Awayuki brings out the best in her colleagues during collaborations, surprising and pleasing Awayuki.
7	"Episode 7"	Ryo Okubo	Inaho Fujio	Rika Tsushima	"Not Bocchi... Natsu" (ノットボッチ...夏) by Chami Yanagase (Sayaka Kikuchi)	August 18, 2024
As Awayuki heads to the Live-On office, she stumbles onto a collapsed Kaeru Yamatani and helps her up. When Kaeru shares she has not collaborated with their colleagues due to her worry of alienating them, Awayuki offers herself to be her first collaboration partner, and they enjoy each other's banter as they streamed. Kaeru thanks Awayuki for instilling confidence in her and aspires to work harder to make Awayuki proud. Later, Awayuki and Chami head to an amusement park where Chami aims to improve her extroversion as they enjoy the attractions, though she gets placed in situations that leave her frightened, much to her embarrassment.
8	"Episode 8"	Hodaka Kuramoto	Deko Akao	Takuya Asaoka	"Cobalt Memories" (コバルトメモリーズ) by Mashiro Irodori (Saku Mizuno)	August 25, 2024
Awayuki announces she will hold an offline collaboration stream with Mashiro at her new apartment as her former address got doxxed and had to move. Mashiro arrives and settles in as she and Awayuki engage in small talk during the stream. They then prepare to sleep, where Mashiro reveals she has been watching over Awayuki since her debut and saw her struggle before her big break. As Mashiro states her happiness with Awayuki being full of energy ever since, Awayuki also opens up how her persona allowed her to be herself and have more confidence. Awayuki praises her when Mashiro mopes on being a burden to her while reflecting on defending her from mean-spirited comments during Awayuki's first year. Hearing this, Mashiro expresses her love to Awayuki, and Awayuki reciprocates the gesture.
9	"Episode 9"	Kahoru Fujiki	Mini Izumi	Kahoru Fujiki	"Sorairo no Yubisaki" (空色の指先) by Eirai Sonokaze (M・A・O)	September 1, 2024
Shion organizes a livestream featuring various Live-On talents where they will act out improv skits, with a cash prize being awarded to which duo can leave the biggest impression; Awayuki and Sei win, and they spend the prize on treating the participants for dinner. Sometime later, Awayuki and a scared Eirai collaborate to play a horror game. Under pressure from the game and Awayuki's commentary, Eirai lashes out and unintentionally showcases a brasher and abrasive side of her personality, surprising Awayuki and the viewers. Awayuki assures her she can be able to balance both personae as they continue playing through the game.
10	"Episode 10"	Takuya Asaoka	Matsuryou Aka	Takuya Asaoka	"2001-nen no Game Kiss" (2001年のゲームキッス) by Nekoma Hirune (Ayaka Ōhashi)	September 8, 2024
Live-On participates in a social deduction game and they discuss the game mechanics before starting the match and splitting into groups to accomplish their tasks. Each Live-On member is gradually eliminated as the game progresses, fostering suspicion between the survivors. Chami is exposed as one of the traitors and is eliminated. The survivors decide to split into two groups to finish the remaining tasks. During this, Mashiro poisons Awayuki and shares how she and Chami eliminated each member. Before finishing her off, Alice intervenes and kills Mashiro, ending the game with a victory for the survivors. Later at a Live-On afterparty, Hareru is approached by Suzuki to hold a solo concert, which she agrees to do on one condition.
11	"Episode 11"	Shigeki Awai	Inaho Fujio	Takuya Asaoka & Kahoru Fujiki	"Fuyu no Hi no Étranger" (冬の日のエトランゼ) by Alice Sōma (Azusa Tadokoro)	September 15, 2024
Awayuki receives a call from Suzuki on being invited to do a duet on Hareru's concert, much to her surprise. Upon hearing how Hareru tends to decline any events focusing on herself, Awayuki accepts the offer. Awayuki asks to Hareru after rehearsal why she agreed to do the concert; Hareru only implies that she is a genius. As she ponders on Hareru's implication, Awayuki is suddenly roped into a collaboration stream with Alice and Mashiro where they fight over her affection, much to her chagrin. When she stumbles on a question of her current concern during the stream, Awayuki begins to wonder on Hareru's actions.
12	"Episode 12"	Ryo Okubo	Deko Akao	Takuya Asaoka	"Live Start ALL STAR Ver." (ライブスタートALL STAR Ver.) by Live-On Cast	September 22, 2024
Hareru begins rehearsing for her concert as she reminisces on how much her juniors have grown since their debuts. She and Awayuki discuss on sticking true to themselves and if they ever wanted to be someone else. On the day of Hareru's concert, Hareru shares her nervousness on sharing the stage with Awayuki before being called onstage. Awayuki later joins Hareru as Hareru begins singing a song narrating her loneliness and how Live-On was founded, much to Awayuki and the audience's surprise. Hareru then shares how seeing her juniors made her strive to continue as a VTuber and get to know them more, inspiring Awayuki and they sing their duet.

=== YouTube channel ===
A YouTube channel called "Live-On" was launched on May 15, 2024. Promotional content, songs and more are posted on this channel to promote the anime and manga.

== See also ==
- Wave, Listen to Me!
