= Kamora =

Kamora may refer to:

- Kamora (brand), a brand of coffee liqueur produced in Mexico.
- Kamora (diacritic), a diacritical mark used in Old Cyrillic script.
- Kahmora Hall, American drag queen
