= List of listed buildings in Kennethmont, Aberdeenshire =

This is a list of listed buildings in the parish of Kennethmont in Aberdeenshire, Scotland.

== List ==
Name	Location	Date Listed	Grid Ref. (Note: Sometimes known as OSGB36, the grid reference (where provided) is based on the British national grid reference system used by the Ordnance Survey. • "Guide to National Grid". Ordnance Survey. • "Get-a-map". Ordnance Survey.)	Geo-coordinates	Notes	LB Number (Note: Historic Environment Scotland assign a unique alphanumeric identifier to each designated site in Scotland, for listed buildings this always begins with "LB", for example "LB12345".)	Image
Ardmore Distillery Including Kiln, Former Malt Barn, Stillhouse And Bonded Warehouses				57°21′06″N 2°44′45″W	Category B	49668	Upload Photo
Leith Hall, East Lodge, Gatepiers And Gates				57°20′59″N 2°45′12″W	Category C(S)	12949	Upload Photo
Wardhouse Cottages				57°21′18″N 2°42′31″W	Category C(S)	9190	Upload Photo
Manse Of Kennethmont				57°21′01″N 2°45′54″W	Category C(S)	9178	Upload Photo
Manse Of Kennethmont Offices				57°21′00″N 2°45′55″W	Category C(S)	9179	Upload Photo
Home Farm Of Leithhall, Steading				57°21′33″N 2°45′22″W	Category C(S)	9187	Upload Photo
Leith Hall, Walled Garden				57°21′27″N 2°45′58″W	Category C(S)	9185	Upload Photo
Leith Hall, West Lodge, Gatepiers And Gates				57°21′26″N 2°46′18″W	Category C(S)	12950	Upload Photo
Bridge Over Railway Leithhall East Drive				57°21′09″N 2°45′37″W	Category B	9182	Upload Photo
Leith Hall				57°21′23″N 2°45′53″W	Category A	9183	Upload Photo
Leith Hall, Offices At N.E. Corner Of Garden				57°21′29″N 2°45′56″W	Category B	9186	Upload Photo
Old Bridge Over Water Of Bogie				57°22′13″N 2°47′19″W	Category C(S)	9189	Upload Photo
Wardhouse Drive Bridge Over Railway				57°21′29″N 2°43′20″W	Category C(S)	9191	Upload Photo
Old Churchyard Of Kennethmont				57°21′13″N 2°45′58″W	Category B	9181	Upload Photo
Howets Of Kennethmont Bridge Over Railway And Water Of Bogie				57°22′13″N 2°47′18″W	Category B	9188	Upload Photo
Wardhouse				57°21′53″N 2°43′39″W	Category B	9192	Upload Photo
Kennethmont Parish Church				57°20′53″N 2°45′29″W	Category B	9177	Upload Photo
Lodge Of Kennethmont Farm				57°20′59″N 2°46′07″W	Category C(S)	9180	Upload Photo
Wardhouse Home Farm				57°21′55″N 2°43′20″W	Category B	6739	Upload Photo

== Key ==
The scheme for classifying buildings in Scotland is:

- Category A: "buildings of national or international importance, either architectural or historic; or fine, little-altered examples of some particular period, style or building type."
- Category B: "buildings of regional or more than local importance; or major examples of some particular period, style or building type, which may have been altered."
- Category C: "buildings of local importance; lesser examples of any period, style, or building type, as originally constructed or moderately altered; and simple traditional buildings which group well with other listed buildings."

In March 2016 there were 47,288 listed buildings in Scotland. Of these, 8% were Category A, and 50% were Category B, with the remaining 42% being Category C.

== See also ==
- List of listed buildings in Aberdeenshire
