= Phillips Distilling Company =

Distillery based in Minneapolis, Minnesota

Phillips Distilling Company LLC
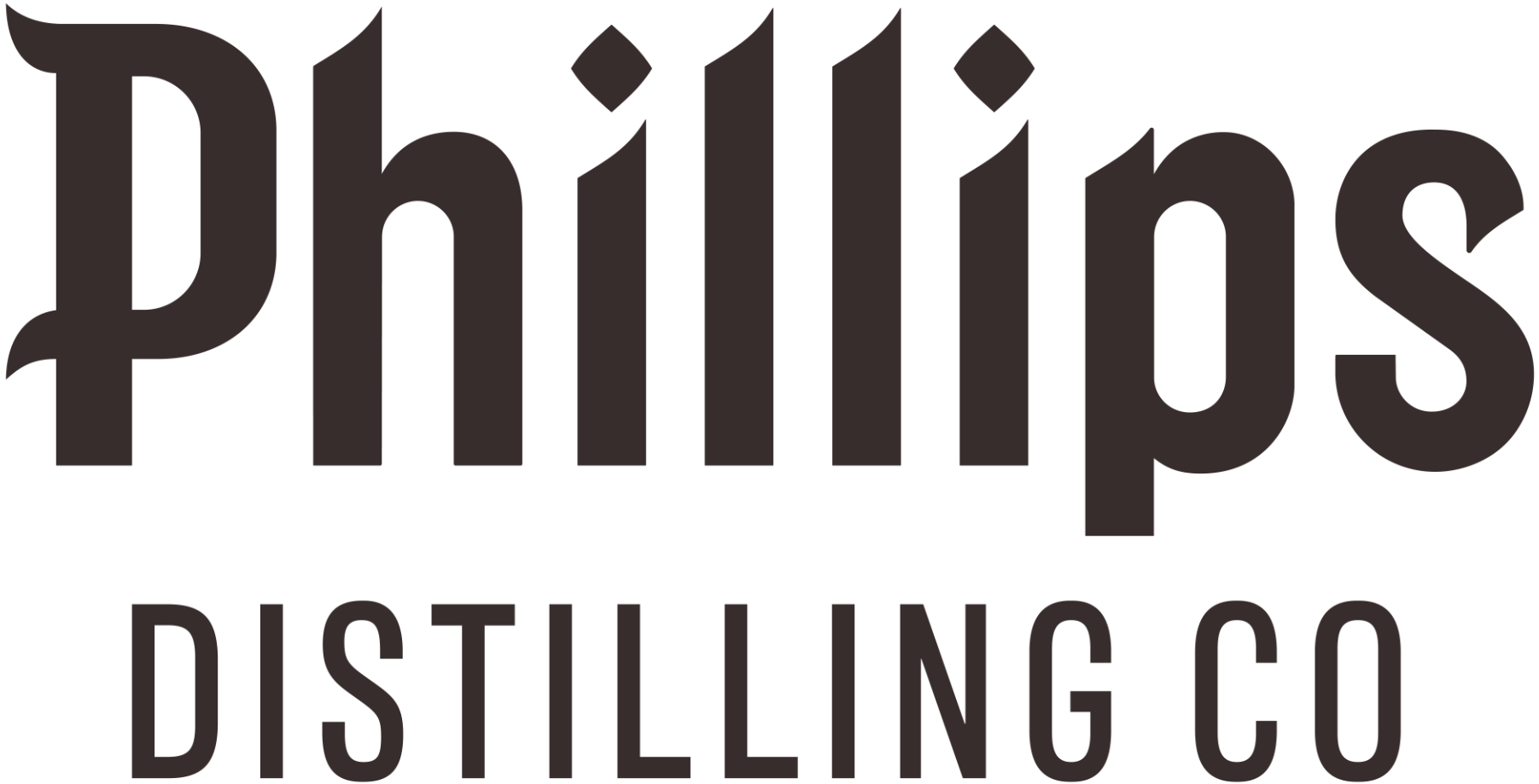
- Formerly: Ed Phillips & Sons (1912–1971)
- Company type: Private
- Industry: Beverages
- Founded: 1912; 114 years ago, in Manitowoc, Wisconsin, U.S.
- Headquarters: Princeton, Minnesota, U.S.
- Key people: Andy England (CEO); Brian Kohlbeck (CFO)
- Products: vodka, liqueur, brandy, gin, rum, Canadian whisky, and schnapps
- Owner: The Phillips Family
- Website: phillipsdistilling.com

Phillips Distilling Company LLC is an American beverage manufacturer and distributor based in Princeton, Minnesota. The company produces a variety of alcoholic drink products, including UV Vodka and Kamora liqueur. As of 2021, it is the largest liquor producer in the state of Minnesota.

Phillips' main products include vodka, gin, rum, Canadian whisky, brandy and schnapps. Phillips also produces specialty drinks such as Revel Stoke Spiced Whisky, Gin-Ka, Phillips Union Whiskey, and a 100 proof series of schnapps. In addition, Phillips formerly produced the Belvedere Vodka brand before selling it to LVMH.

A privately held company, it is owned by the Phillips Family. Minnesota Congressman Dean Phillips was the company’s president and CEO from 2000 until 2012.

== History ==
Founded as Ed Phillips & Sons in 1912 in Manitowoc, Wisconsin, the company originally sold candy, newspapers, and tobacco. However, at the end of Prohibition in 1933, it switched to producing liquor. Soon afterwards, the family moved the company to Minneapolis, Minnesota, where it began making its schnapps product line. At the end of World War II, Ed Phillips & Sons was the largest liquor producer in the United States.

In 1971, founder Ed Phillips sold the company to the American conglomerate Alco Standard. When Alco Standard began liquidation in the mid-1980s, the Phillips family leveraged a buyout of their former family business. Keeping only the brand management division, the company was rebranded as Phillips Distilling.

Since the 1990s, Phillips Distilling has gone on to add new brands of vodka and alcoholic drinks to its portfolio. Notably, it introduced Belvedere Vodka to the United States and, in addition, acquired the Kamora and Leroux brands from Suntory Global Spirits in 2021.
