= Pinnacle vodka =

Brand of vodka

Pinnacle Vodka
- Type: Vodka
- Manufacturer: Suntory Global Spirits
- Origin: France
- Introduced: 2002
- Alcohol by volume: 35 - 50%
- Proof (US): 70 - 100
- Variants: List of flavors
- Website: Pinnacle Vodka

Pinnacle is a brand of vodka owned by Suntory Global Spirits, a subsidiary of Suntory Holdings of Osaka, Japan. It is distilled in France from French wheat then exported to the United States where it is flavored and bottled by Suntory.

It is currently available in around 30 flavors. The brand was launched by the White Rock Distillery in Lewiston, Maine in 2002. On April 23, 2012 it was announced that Beam Inc. would acquire the Pinnacle brand for $600 million. In January 2013, Beam announced that it would close the former White Rock distillery plant and shift production to Kentucky. The Lewiston bottlery and a portion of the White Rock brands were subsequently acquired by Sazerac Company.

== Awards and recognition ==
Pinnacle Vodka was ranked the #1 Premium Spirit Worldwide based on growth 3 years in a row from 2010-2012.

Pinnacle Vodka Awards:

- 2007, 2008, 2009, & 2010 Charles Schwab Impact Hot Brand Award
- 2007, 2008 & 2010 Beverage Testing Institute Gold Award
- Adam's Beverage Group 2008, 2009, 2010 & 2011 Growth Brand Award

Pinnacle flavored vodka awards:

- Pinnacle Whipped - Product of the Year New Hampshire Liquor Commission 2010
- Pinnacle Citrus - 2011 The Fifty Best - Best Flavored Vodka Double Gold Medal
- Pinnacle Tropical Punch - 2011 The Fifty Best - Best Flavored Vodka Double Gold Medal
- Pinnacle Le Doublé Espresso - 2011 The Fifty Best- Best Flavored Vodka Double Gold Medal
- Pinnacle Kiwi Strawberry - 2011 The Fifty Best- Best Flavored Vodka Gold Medal 9
- Pinnacle Whipped - 2011 The Fifty Best- Best Flavored Vodka Gold Medal

== Product timeline ==
- 2002: Pinnacle Vodka package was designed.
- 2003: Pinnacle Classic Vodka is launched.
- 2005: Pinnacle Kiwi Strawberry, Raspberry, Apple, Cherry, Citrus, and Orange flavors were introduced.
- 2006: Pinnacle Grape and Blueberry were introduced, and the package was updated.
- 2007: Pinnacle Vanilla, Espresso, and Pinnacle Gin were introduced.
- 2008: Pinnacle became a priority brand for White Rock Distilleries, and the company began investing heavily with national advertising. Pinnacle Melon, Banana, Mango, Chocolate, Pomegranate, Le Doublé Espresso, Root Beer, and Butterscotch were introduced. Pinnacle was ranked the #7 imported vodka in the US.
- 2009: Pinnacle Cherry Lemonade, Tropical Punch and Pinnacle 100 Proof were introduced
- 2010: Pinnacle was ranked the #6 imported vodka in the US. Pinnacle Cotton Candy and Whipped were introduced.
- 2011: Pinnacle Vodka Ranks #6 Imported vodka by Impact Magazine. Pinnacle Cherry Whipped, Orange Whipped, Chocolate Whipped, Cake, Gummy®, Coconut, Cookie Dough, Marshmallow, Red Berry, Key Lime Whipped, Pineapple, and Atomic Hots™ were introduced.
- 2012: Brand sold to Beam Inc., 1st broadcast TV commercial introduced. Pinnacle Blackberry, Cucumber Watermelon, Peach, and Pumpkin Pie were introduced.
- 2013: Rainbow Sherbet and Strawberry Shortcake flavors introduced.
- In November 2013, Pinnacle Vodka and Cinnabon teamed up to introduce their own brand of cinnamon flavored vodka, Cinnabon Vodka.

== Advertising ==
Pinnacle released a "Paper or Plastic" television ad in 2012. The ad portrays a woman's fantasy of being served Pinnacle Whipped in a whipped world by two men named Papier and Plastic. The ad ends with her snapping out of her daydream by two men, at a grocery store, asking her if she'd like paper or plastic bags for her Pinnacle. This was not shown in Pennsylvania television markets, due to the Pennsylvania Liquor Control Board having a monopoly on liquor sales in its state-owned/operated Fine Wine and Good Spirits stores.
