= Sauza Tequila =

Company

Sauza Tequila Import Company
- Industry: Tequila
- Founded: 1873; 153 years ago
- Founder: Don Cenobio Sauza
- Headquarters: Tequila, Mexico
- Products: Sauza; Conmemorativo; Hornitos; Tres Generaciones
- Owner: Suntory Global Spirits
- Website: Casa Sauza

Sauza Tequila Import Company is a producer of tequila located in Tequila, a municipality of the state of Jalisco, Mexico and owned by Suntory Global Spirits, a subsidiary of Suntory Holdings of Osaka, Japan.

The company was founded in 1873 when Don Cenobio Sauza started La Perseverancia distillery. Sauza Tequila Import Company is Their products include Sauza, Conmemorativo, Hornitos and Tres Generaciones.

== History ==
=== Three generations of Sauza Dons ===
==== Don Cenobio Sauza ====
In 1873 Don Cenobio Sauza founded Sauza at La Perseverancia distillery. He was the first distiller to call the spirit produced from blue agave plant "tequila" and the first to export the drink to the United States.

==== Don Eladio Sauza ====
His son, Don Eladio Sauza was born in Tequila in 1883. When he was old enough to continue the family tradition, he expanded the family business by opening branches in Monterrey and Mexico City and a concession in Spain.

==== Don Francisco Javier Sauza ====
In 1931, Don Eladio Sauza's son, Don Francisco Javier Sauza took over the business and continued the family legacy by broadening distribution and its product's reputation as one of the highest-quality tequilas in the world.

=== Ownership ===
By the 1970s, demand for tequila was increasing worldwide. Sauza distillery formed a partnership with the leading Spanish brandy producer, Pedro Domecq. This relationship eventually led to Pedro Domecq's complete purchase of Sauza distillery in 1988.

In the first of a series of beverage-giant transfers, in 1994 the new owner was itself acquired by Allied Lyons to form Allied Domecq. That company was purchased by Fortune Brands in July 2005, and then spun off with other drinks businesses as Beam Inc. in October 2011. In April 2014, Suntory bought Beam Inc. for about $16 billion, and renamed the unit Beam Suntory. In May 2024, Beam Suntory was re-branded as Suntory Global Spirits . Suntory Beverage & Food Ltd trades on the Tokyo Stock Exchange (2587). Sauza tequila products are still distilled at La Perseverancia (NOM: 1102).

== Products ==
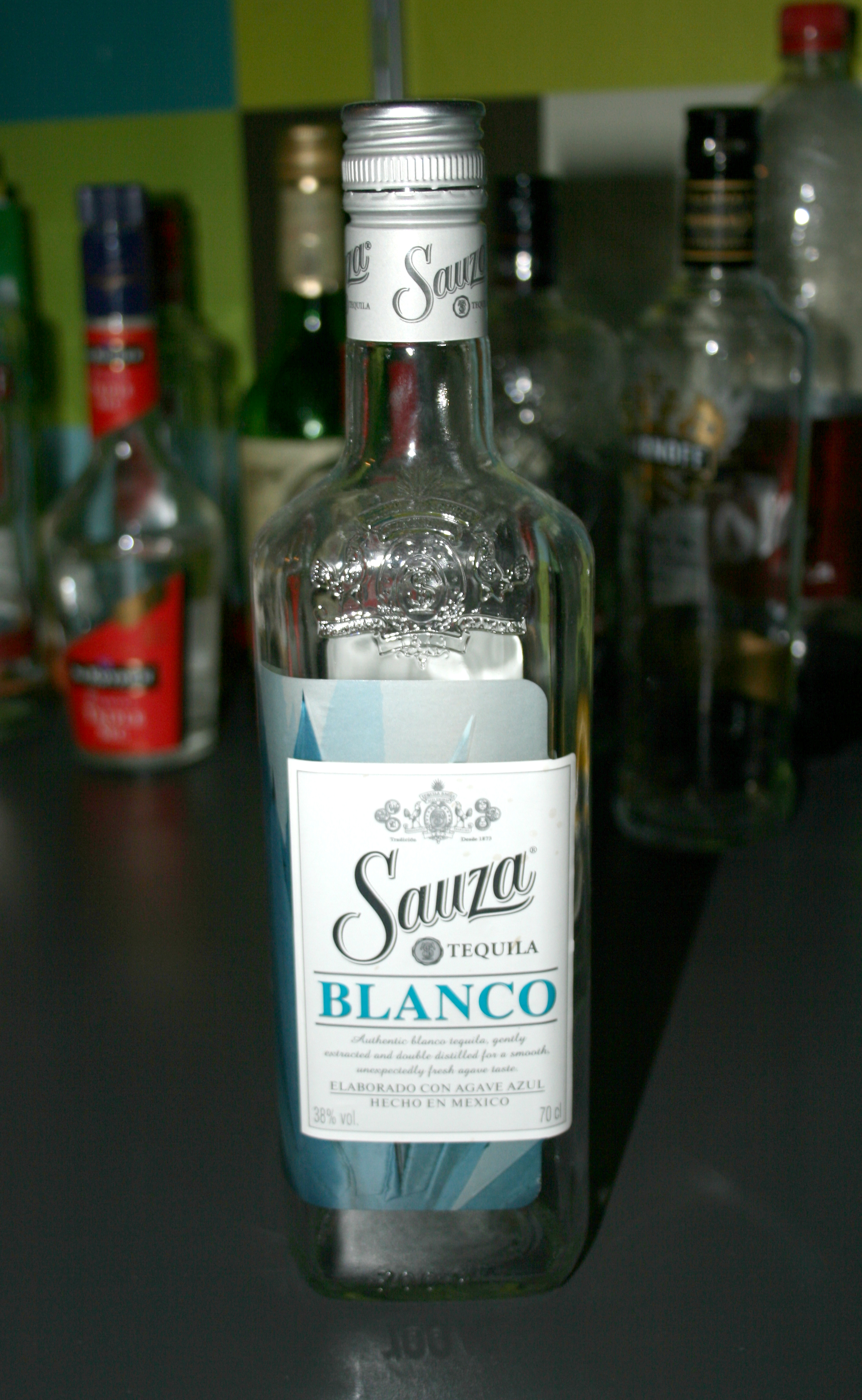
Sauza Blanco

=== Sauza Tequila ===
- Sauza Blanco – double distilled, unaged
- Sauza Extra Gold – double distilled, unaged 40% abv
- Sauza Blue Silver - 100% agave, double distilled, unaged
- Sauza Blue Reposado - 100% agave, double distilled, rested in oak casks

=== Conmemorativo ===
Sauza Conmemorativo – 100% agave (since 2012). Aged 18 months in oak Bourbon casks - long enough to be called añejo

=== Hornitos ===
- Hornitos Plata – 100% blue agave, double distilled, unaged
- Hornitos Reposado – 100% blue agave, double distilled, rested two months in 10,000 gallon oak vats
- Hornitos Añejo – 100% blue agave, double distilled, aged at least 12 months in American oak barrels
- Hornitos Black Barrel - takes the standard Hornitos Anejo tequila aged for a year in traditional oak barrels and then finishes that tequila in heavily charred American Oak casks for four months, and then moves it to a toasted American Oak barrel for another two months.

=== Tres Generaciones ===
- Tres Generaciones Plata - 100% blue agave, triple-distilled, unaged.
- Tres Generaciones Reposado - 100% blue agave, triple-distilled, aged at least four months in American oak barrels
- Tres Generaciones Añejo - 100% blue agave, triple-distilled, aged at least 12 months in toasted American oak barrels

== Awards ==
Sauza's offerings have been moderately successful at international spirit ratings competitions. The best showing was for the brand's Hacienda Reposado tequila, which won a gold rating at the 2006 San Francisco World Spirits Competition. The Extra Gold tequila won bronze at the 2007 San Francisco World Spirits Competition, and received a score of 81 from the Beverage Testing Institute in the same year.
