= Tamazulita, Jalisco =

Coordinates: 20°12′N 103°58′W

Tamazulita in 2021.

Tamazulita is a town in the Mexican state of Jalisco. It is part of the Tecolotlán municipality. The population was 1,422 according to the 2020 census.
