= Suntory Global Spirits =

Multinational beverage company

Suntory Global Spirits Inc.
- Logo used since 2024
- Formerly: Beam Inc. Beam Suntory, Inc.
- Type: Subsidiary
- Industry: Drink industry
- Predecessor: Beam Global Spirits & Wine
- Founded: 2011; 15 years ago (as Beam Inc.)
- Headquarters: New York City, New York, U.S.
- Area served: Worldwide
- Key people: Greg Hughes (president & CEO)
- Products: Alcoholic beverages
- Revenue: ▲US$3.1 billion
- Number of employees: 6,000
- Parent: Suntory Holdings
- Website: suntoryglobalspirits.com

Suntory Global Spirits Inc., formerly known as Beam Suntory, Inc., and before that as Beam, Inc., is an American beverage company that is a subsidiary of Suntory Holdings, a Japanese multinational beverage conglomerate. The company produces alcoholic beverages.

== History ==
James Beam began selling barrels of whiskey in 1795. By 1935, his family's business was formally established as the James B. Beam Distilling Company. Ten years later, the Chicago spirits merchant Harry Blum bought the company, and in 1968 sold it to American Brands, Inc.

In 1987, the James B. Beam Distilling Company purchased National Distillers and renamed itself the Jim Beam Brands Company. It was known as Jim Beam Brands Worldwide, Inc. by the time Fortune Brands purchased it in 2005. Fortune Brands also acquired 20 brands from Allied Domecq in 2005, worth $5 billion, which turned Fortune Brands into one of the largest producers of whiskey in the international market.

In 2006, the company was renamed Beam Global Spirits & Wine, Inc. It was split from Fortune Brands to become an independent publicly traded company, Beam Inc., in 2011. As a distinct entity, the company was established as Beam Inc. on October 3, 2011, from the remainder of the Fortune Brands holding company after it sold and divested various other product lines to form a business focused exclusively on spirits and directly related products.

In December 2011, Beam Inc. agreed to buy the only independent Irish whiskey distiller that existed at the time, the Cooley Distillery, for $95 million. On April 23, 2012, Beam announced it would acquire the Pinnacle vodka and Calico Jack rum brands for $600 million.

Previous Beam logo

Logo until May 2024

In January 2014, Suntory announced a deal to buy Beam Inc. for about $13.6 billion. The acquisition was completed in April 2014, for a final cost of about $16 billion, when it was announced that Beam would become a subsidiary named "Beam Suntory." The acquisition created a culture shock within the company, when Japanese managers implied that the American-made Jim Beam whisky could be improved with the kaizen Japanese technique of continual improvement.

In November 2015, the company sold Harveys Bristol Cream sherry, as well as the brandy brands Fundador, Terry Centenario, and Tres Cepas, to Grupo Emperador Spain S.A., part of the Alliance Global Group for €275 million.

In March 2016, the company announced it would move its headquarters to the Merchandise Mart building on Chicago's Near North Side; Beam Suntory is subleasing 110,000 sq. ft on the 16th floor of the Mart from Motorola Mobility.

The Chicago Cubs and Beam Suntory announced a long-term sponsorship deal in January 2017, making Beam the official spirits partner of the Cubs and Wrigley Field.

In 2021, the Kamora and Leroux brands were sold to Minnesota-based Phillips Distilling.

In July 2022, Governor Beshear of Kentucky announced a major investment in Kentucky's bourbon industry as Beam Suntory will expand the capacity of Jim Beam Brands Co. with a $400 million investment that will create more than 50 full-time jobs at the Booker Noe Distillery in Boston, along with a new facility to produce renewable natural gas standards to power the expansion.

In 2024, Beam Suntory sold Courvoisier Cognac to Italy's Campari Group.

In May 2024, Beam Suntory was re-branded as Suntory Global Spirits including the launch of a new website and visual identity.

== Brands ==
The company's principal products include Bourbon whiskey, Japanese whisky, Scotch whisky, Irish whiskey, Canadian whisky, tequila, vodka, cognac, rum, gin, cordials, and ready-to-drink pre-mixed cocktails. It is the third-largest producer of distilled beverages worldwide, behind Diageo and Pernod Ricard.

Suntory Global Spirit beverage brands include:

- American whiskey:
  - Bourbon whiskey: Baker's, Basil Hayden's, Beam's Eight Star, Booker's, Jim Beam, Kessler, Knob Creek, Legent, Maker's Mark, Old Crow, Old Grand-Dad
  - Rye whiskey: Jim Beam Rye, Knob Creek Rye, Old Overholt
  - Blended whiskey: Beam's Eight Star, Kessler,
- Canadian whisky: Alberta Premium, Canadian Club
- Irish whiskey: Connemara, Kilbeggan, The Tyrconnell
- Japanese whisky: Chita, Hakushu, Hibiki, Kakubin, Yamazaki, Toki (a blend of two single malts and a single grain)
- Scotch whisky:
  - Single malt Scotch: Ardmore, Auchentoshan, Bowmore, Glen Garioch, Laphroaig
  - Blended Scotch whisky: Teacher's Highland Cream
- Spanish whisky: DYC whisky
- Gin: Larios, Sipsmith, Roku
- Liqueur: DeKuyper, Midori, Sourz
- Rum: Cruzan
- Tequila: El Tesoro de Don Felipe, Hornitos, Sauza, Tres Generaciones, 100 Años
- Vodka: Effen, Haku, Pinnacle, Vox
- Chūhai: Strong Zero (-196)

In addition to brands produced directly by the company and its subsidiaries, Suntory Global Spirit imports and markets some brands produced by others, such as the DeKuyper cordial and formerly the coffee liqueur Kamora. Beam facilities also produce spirits for brands owned by other companies, such as Calvert Extra blended whiskey, now owned by Luxco.

== In popular culture ==
In the 2003 Sofia Coppola movie Lost in Translation, actor Bill Murray goes to Japan to shoot a commercial for the Suntory whisky and drops the now famous slogan, "For relaxing times, make it Suntory time."

== FCPA Violation ==
In October 2020, Beam Suntory Inc. agreed to pay a criminal monetary penalty of $19,572,885 to resolve a United States department's investigation into violations of the Foreign Corrupt Practices Act (FCPA). The resolution arose in part out of Beam's scheme to pay a bribe to an Indian government official in exchange for approval of a license to bottle a line of products that Beam sought to market and sell in India, and related internal controls and books and records violations, which included efforts by a then-member of Beam's legal department to affirmatively avoid uncovering information related to improper activities and practices by third-parties engaged by Beam in India that presented corruption risks. Beam entered into a three-year deferred prosecution agreement with the Criminal Division's Fraud Section and the U.S. Attorney's Office for the Northern District of Illinois in connection with criminal information unsealed in the Northern District of Illinois charging Beam with one count of conspiracy to violate the anti-bribery, internal controls, and books and records provisions of the FCPA.

== See also ==
- 2016 Jim Beam strike
