= 2014 Commonwealth Games closing ceremony =

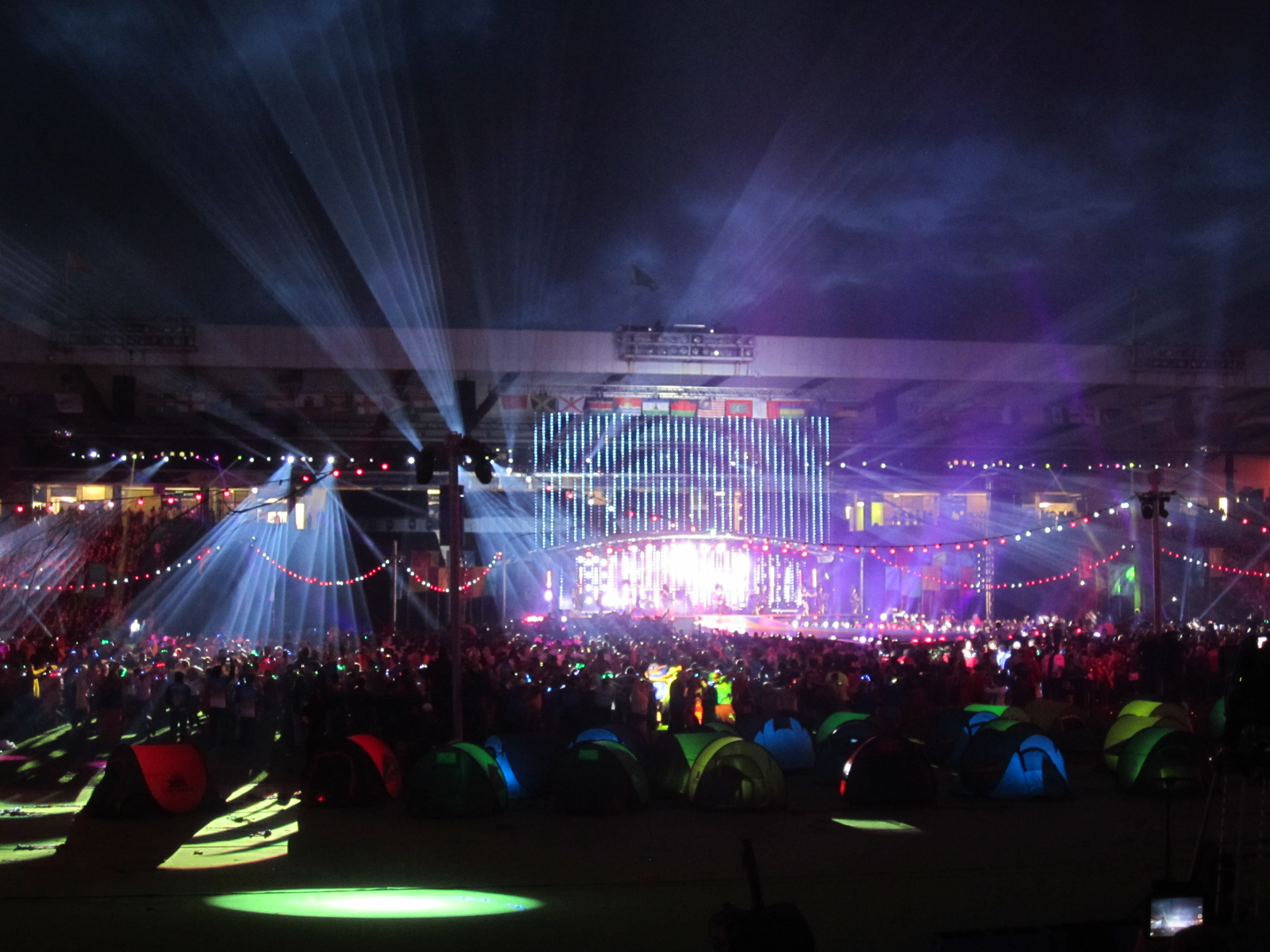
- Date: 3 August 2014
- Time: 21:00 – 22:50 BST (UTC+1)
- Location: Hampden Park, Glasgow, Scotland; 55°49′33″N 4°15′7″W
- Also known as: All Back to Ours
- Filmed by: BBC Scotland
- Participants: Lulu; Kylie Minogue; Deacon Blue; Karen Matheson; Jessica Mauboy; Dougie MacLean; Des Clarke

The closing ceremony of the 2014 Commonwealth Games, was held on 3 August 2014. Entitled "All Back to Ours", it was held at the Hampden Park, the main stadium of the event, in Glasgow, Scotland.

== Sequence of events ==
The closing ceremony took a visual theme of a music festival, with performers, tents and flags within the stadium. The ceremony began with Scottish singer Lulu welcoming the athletes of the games. Scottish band Deacon Blue performed their signature song "Dignity". During this the workers of Glasgow were recognised as they paraded along the front of the main stand at Hampden, some on foot, others in their work vehicles.

Local band Prides performed their hit song "Messiah". As the Commonwealth Games flag was lowered and handed to the Gold Coast, Scottish folk singer Karen Matheson performed the Robert Burns song "Ae Fond Kiss".

Speeches followed, with Prince Imran telling the crowd that the games were "pure dead brilliant", a local Glaswegian term. The games were officially closed and handed over to the Gold Coast for 2018, who began their own performance with Australian singer Jessica Mauboy.

Australian singer Kylie Minogue then performed a seven-hit songs set list, while the volunteer cast told the story of "a typical Glasgow night out". Her costume was designed by Jean Paul Gaultier and headpiece designed by millinery designer Lara Jensen. The show ended with Dougie MacLean performing Caledonia with the other performers, and a performance of "Auld Lang Syne".

== Music ==
Main musical items in the opening ceremony, in the order first performed
| Piece | Artist | Notes |
|---|---|---|
| "Shout" | Lulu | Played live while welcoming the athletes of the Games |
| "Dignity" | Deacon Blue | Played live while the workers of Glasgow paraded along the front of the main stand at Hampden Stadium |
| "Messiah" | Prides | Played live at the ceremony |
| "Ae Fond Kiss" | Karen Matheson | Played live while the Commonwealth Games flag was lowered and handed to the Gold Coast 2018 team |
| "Sea of Flags" | Jessica Mauboy | Played live as part of the Gold Coast 2018 presentation |
| "Everything is Possible" | Jessica Mauboy | Played live as part of the Gold Coast 2018 presentation |
| "Spinning Around" | Kylie Minogue | Closing Party |
| "Into the Blue" | Kylie Minogue | Closing Party |
| "Love at First Sight" | Kylie Minogue | Closing Party |
| "All the Lovers" | Kylie Minogue | Closing Party |
| "The Loco-Motion" | Kylie Minogue | Closing Party |
| "Beautiful" | Kylie Minogue | Closing Party |
| "Can't Get You Out of My Head" | Kylie Minogue | Closing Party |
| "Caledonia" | Dougie MacLean | Played live at the ceremony |
| "Auld Lang Syne" | Dougie MacLean, Kylie Minogue and Lulu | Played live at the ceremony |

== See also ==
- 2014 Commonwealth Games opening ceremony
