= Kennethmont =

Coordinates: 57.3507°N 2.7680°W

- Location within Aberdeenshire
- Population: 470
- OS grid reference: NJ536294
- Council area: Aberdeenshire
- Lieutenancy area: Aberdeenshire
- Country: Scotland
- Sovereign state: United Kingdom
- Post town: HUNTLY
- Postcode district: AB54
- Police: Scotland
- Fire: Scottish
- Ambulance: Scottish
- UK Parliament: Gordon and Buchan
- Scottish Parliament: Aberdeenshire West

Kennethmont (archaically Kinnethmont, or Kirkhill of Kennethmont) is a village in the Marr area of Aberdeenshire, Scotland, approximately 8 miles (13 km) south of Huntly.

It has a population of approximately 470 people. Kennethmont children attend Kennethmont Primary School and the Gordon Schools, Huntly.

It is part of the Gordon and Buchan UK parliament constituency and the Aberdeenshire West Scottish parliament constituency.

== Transport ==
The B9002 road runs through the village, connecting to Insch to the east and to the A97 road between Huntly and Alford to the west.

The Aberdeen to Inverness railway runs through Kennethmont, but there is no station, Kennethmont railway station having closed in 1968.

== Notable buildings ==
Leith Hall is a country house built in 1650 and now maintained by the National Trust for Scotland.

Ardmore distillery is a single malt whisky distillery located to the east of the village.

== See also ==
- List of listed buildings in Kennethmont, Aberdeenshire

== Notable residents ==
- William Milne (1785–1822), missionary, was born near Kennethmont.
- Very Rev Alexander Yule (1830–1907), Moderator of the Presbyterian Church for all Australia, was born in Kennethmont.
- Robert Fraser (1858–1914), bishop, was born in Kennethmont.
- Tom Kennedy (1874–1954), British politician, was born in Kennethmont.
