= El Tesoro tequila =

Mexican tequila brand

El Tesoro
- Type: Tequila
- Manufacturer: La Alteña Distillery
- Distributor: Suntory Global Spirits
- Origin: Jalisco, Mexico
- Alcohol by volume: 40.0%
- Website: www.eltesorotequila.com

El Tesoro is a brand of tequila produced at a distillery in Jalisco, Mexico. In the United States, the brand is marketed by Suntory Global Spirits, a subsidiary of Suntory Holdings of Osaka, Japan.

== History ==
Don Felipe Camarena was an agave grower who was raised in a family that had previously been making tequila in the Mexican state of Jalisco since the early 1800s. However, after 50 years of producing tequila, the family's distillery had been destroyed during the Mexican revolution of 1910.

Camarena started out by growing and selling agave plants to other distillers, and then in 1937 he opened La Alteña Distillery in Jalisco, 20 miles away from the previous family distillery. His distillery was located near a blue agave growing area and near underground springs which served as a consistent source of energy. Camarena then passed the business on to his son, Felipe J. Camarena Orozco, who then passed it on to his daughters and to his son Carlos Camarena Curiel, who is now the third generation of Master Distiller for the distillery.

The actual brand El Tesoro de Don Felipe began as the product of a joint venture established in 1990 between the Camarena family and the premium tequila promoters Robert J. Denton and Marilyn S. Smith.

The Fortune Brands holding company ended up, in 1999, buying the El Tesoro brand trademark and exclusivity contract from Robert Denton and Marilyn Smith. In October 2011, Fortune Brands divested itself of its various businesses that were unrelated to spirits, and changed the name of its remaining enterprise to Beam Inc. Beam was later acquired by the Suntory company, becoming Beam Suntory and since 2024 Suntory Global Spirits.

== Products ==
- El Tesoro Blanco
- El Tesoro Reposado
- El Tesoro Añejo
- El Tesoro Paradiso
- El Tesoro Extra Añejo
- El Tesoro 85 Anniversario

== Awards ==
Spirit ratings for El Tesoro offerings have been consistently high.
