= Beam's Eight Star =

Whisky brand in the United States

- Bottle of Beam's Eight Star
- Type: Blended whiskey
- Manufacturer: Suntory Global Spirits
- Origin: Clermont, Kentucky United States
- Alcohol by volume: 40.00%
- Proof (US): 80
- Related products: Jim Beam Brands

Beam's Eight Star is a blended whiskey produced in Clermont, Kentucky and Frankfort, Kentucky by Suntory Global Spirits.

Beam's Eight Star is an 80-proof (40% alcohol by volume) mixture of 75% grain neutral spirits and 25% straight whiskey. It is inexpensive due to its high proportion of neutral spirits. Neutral grain spirits do not have to be aged like straight whiskey and can be mass-produced at a much faster rate.

The manufacturer is identified on the label as "The Clear Spring Distilling Company".
