= Teacher's Highland Cream =

Brand of blended Scotch whisky

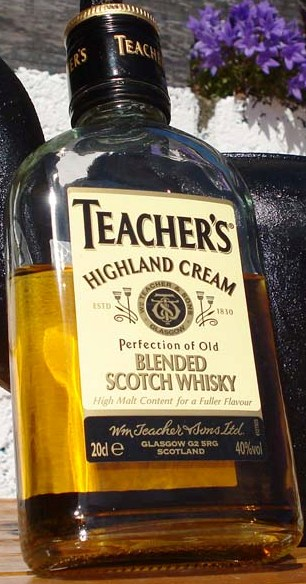
- Type: Scotch whisky
- Manufacturer: Suntory Global Spirits
- Origin: Scotland
- Introduced: 1884
- Alcohol by volume: 40%
- Website: Teacher's Highland Cream

Teacher's Highland Cream is a brand of blended Scotch whisky produced in Glasgow, Scotland by Suntory Global Spirits, a subsidiary of Suntory Holdings of Osaka, Japan.

== History ==
In 1830, William Teacher took advantage of the new "Excise Act" and began selling whisky. From 1832 he was selling it from his wife's grocery shop in Glasgow. By 1856, with help from his sons, he was granted a licence for consumption and opened his own dram shop. He died in 1876, leaving his two sons William Jr and Adam in charge of the company, known as William Teacher & Sons Ltd.

The Teacher's Highland Cream brand was registered in 1884. (The label on the bottles says "est. 1830", reflecting an earlier date when the founding family entered the whisky business, before the brand name was created.) Teacher's states that it uses "fully smoked peated single malt whisky from The Ardmore distillery as its fingerprint whisky" along with about 30 other single malt whiskies. Most of the output of the Ardmore distillery is used to produce the Teacher's brand.

William Teacher sons moved the business to St. Enoch Square, where it remained until 1991. The company opened its Ardmore distillery in 1898, ensuring a guaranteed supply of Scotch for its Teacher's Highland Cream blend. The brand entered the United States market after the end of Prohibition in the United States; the first shipment of Teacher's was sent on the Cunard steamer Scythia. Teacher & Sons acquired the Glendronach distillery in 1960 and built a modern blending and bottling plant in Glasgow in 1962.

In 1976, Teacher & Sons was bought by Allied Breweries, which became part of Allied Lyons in 1978 and then Allied Domecq in 1994. The Glendronach distillery was shut down in 1996 and was later sold off to Chivas Brothers after being reopened in 2002. In 2005, Allied Domecq was taken over by Pernod Ricard. To gain regulatory approval they sold some of the acquired brands to Fortune Brands - these included Ardmore and the Teacher's brand, along with Laphroaig distillery on Islay.

Fortune Brands, which already owned Jim Beam, spun off its spirits division, including Teacher's into Beam Inc. in 2011.

In 2014, Beam was purchased by Suntory to form Beam Suntory, now known as Suntory Global Spirits.
