= Eladio Sauza =

Don Eladio Sauza
- Born: June 16, 1883; Guadalajara, Mexico
- Died: July 22, 1946 (aged 63); Guadalajara, Mexico
- Occupation: Tequila Distiller

Don Eladio Sauza (June 16, 1883 – July 22, 1946) ran the Sauza Tequila business from 1909 to 1946.

== Early life ==
Eladio Sauza was born June 16, 1883, in the city of Tequila, Mexico to Don Cenobio Sauza (1842 – 1909) and Doña Margarita Madrigal Navarro. His father was the founder of the famous Sauza Tequila distillery.

At age 20 Eladio moved to Tecolotlan to take charge of his father's distillery, the Hacienda La Labor. There he learned the business of producing and selling tequila. Later he moved to Mazatlán in the Northeastern part of Mexico to establish a Sauza Tequila distribution center in order to increase exporting.

== Marriage and children ==
Eladio married Doña Silveria Mora Enriquez, with whom he had two children:

- Francisco Javier Sauza
- Carmen Sauza

== Growing Sauza Tequila ==
In 1909 Eladio returned to Guadalajara to mourn his father's death and to take control of the Sauza Tequila business. Shortly thereafter the Mexican Revolution threatened to expropriate Eladio's business and farmland. During the Revolution Eladio rallied patriotic sentiment and helped to establish tequila as the official spirit of Mexico.

Eladio modernized and expanded the family business by opening branches in Monterrey and Mexico City, and a concession in Spain.

== Other enterprises ==
Eladio's interests extended beyond the production of tequila, including:

- Establishing a dairy business called Cremeria Moderna that manufactured the ‘Modelo’ butter.
- In 1932 he established the first commercial radio station in Guadalajara – XEDQ (no longer in existence).
- In 1938 Eladio established the Colonial Club, the first modern nightclub in Guadalajara.
- On August 5, 1942, Eladio and other Guadalajara industrial men issued El Occidental, the town's second newspaper.

== The final years ==
Don Eladio Sauza died on July 22, 1946, at the age of 63. He left the Sauza Tequila business to his firstborn son, Francisco Javier Sauza.
