= Ecotourism in Mexico =

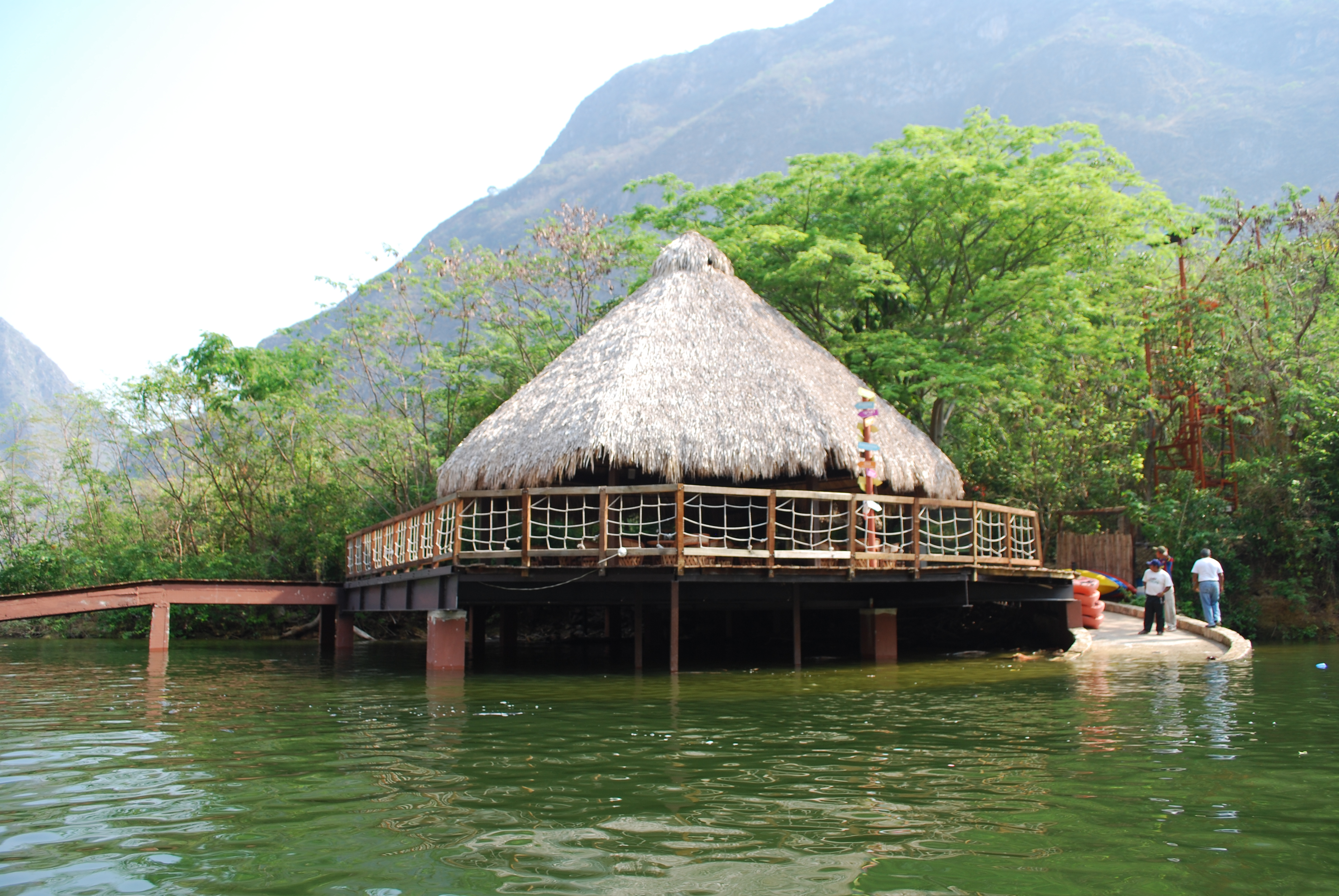
Ecotourism facility in Chicoasén.

Ecotourism in Mexico is tourism that sustainably experiences fragile, pristine and relatively undisturbed natural areas. Tourism is a large source of revenue for Mexico Ecotourism has received mixed responses, but organizations such as the Organization for Economic Co-Operation and Development (OECD) stressed its importance in the long-term economic health of Mexico.

== Policy ==
Ecotourism received support from policymakers as reflected by recent legislation. For example, the General Tourism Law of 2009 prioritizes sustainability in tourism through planning, determining methods for improving tourism resources, and preserving culture and ecological balance.

Mexico introduced policies and programs such as the Programme for Sustainable Regional Tourism Development, Pueblos Mágico, General Tourism Planning of the Territory Programme, and Mexico's Special Climate Change Programme. However, Mexico stated that barriers to adequate infrastructure contribute to environmental challenges in ecotourism.

== Economy ==
According to the World Travel and Tourism Council, Travel and Tourism contributed MXN 3,100.3 billion (US$165.9 billion) to the Mexican economy in 2016, about 16.0 percent, and was expected to rise by 3.7 percent in 2017.

Ecotourism in Mexico faces controversy as tourism displaces other local activities, disadvantaging those not in the industry.

== Environment ==
Mexico's tourism is not ecologically sustainable. In his analysis of tourism in community ecotourism in Ventanilla, Oaxaca, scientist V. S. Avila Foucat of the University of York recommended developing a code of ethics for tourists and establishing incentives for sustainable community projects.

Mexico is home to 42 of UNESCO's Latin America and Caribbean Biosphere Reserves. These sites are popular and important to ecotourism.

In Mexico's INDC, as part of the Paris Agreement under the United Nations Framework Convention on Climate Change, one of their strategic infrastructure goals is for tourist areas to implement adaptation measures in the case of an extreme event. From 2020-2030, more emphasis was to go to the impact the environment has on tourism.

=== Monarch Butterfly Reserve of Mexico ===
The Monarch Butterfly Biosphere Reserve in west-central Mexico is an example of ecotourism that has existed since the 1980s. It was initially proposed that this would be help alleviate poverty and advance conservation efforts. However, David Barkin provided evidence that this conservation effort has been ineffective on improving poverty in this area, especially for indigenous peoples.

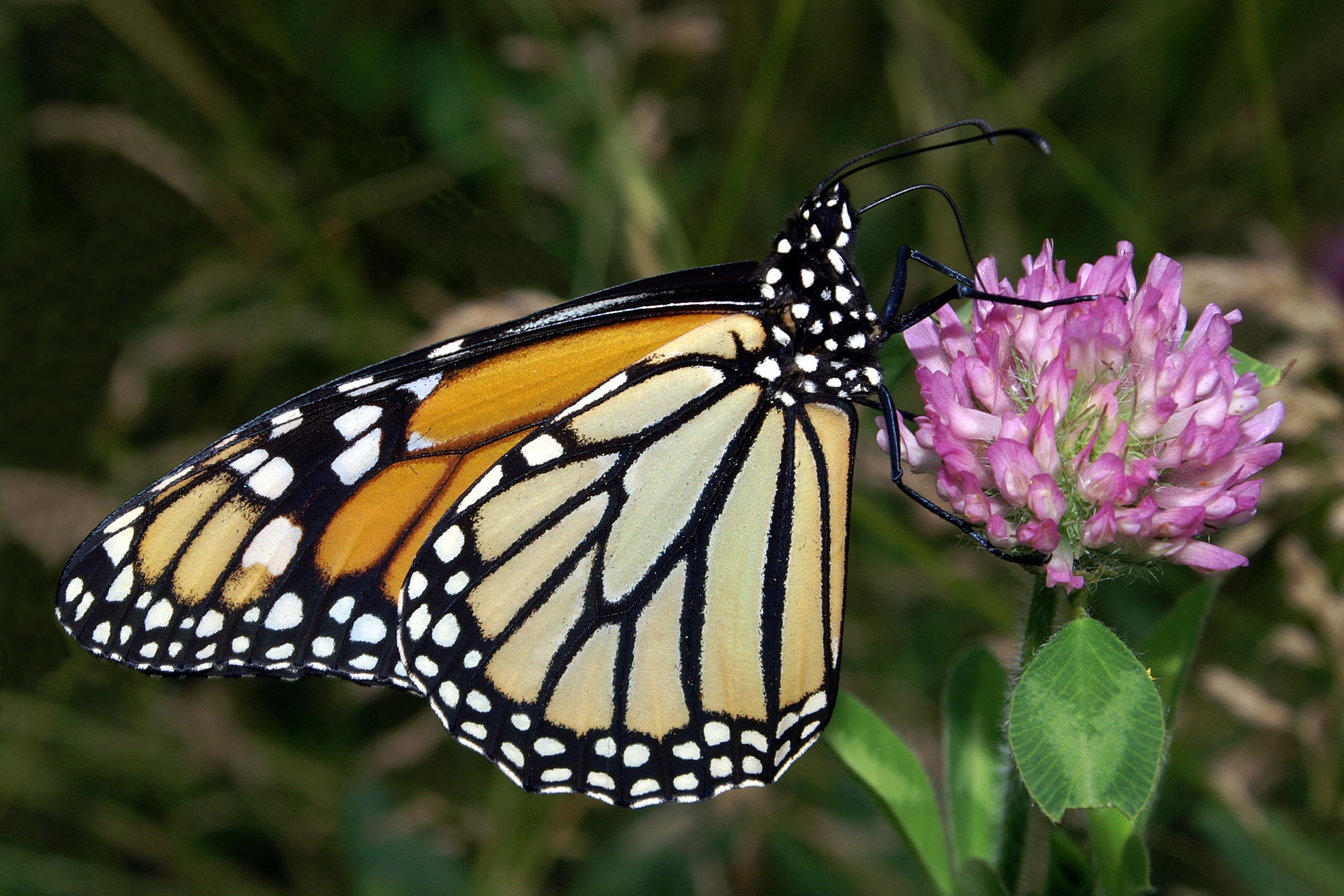
A Monarch Butterfly.

Barkin found that despite attracting over 250,000 visitors yearly the Reserve has not generated any local economic development.

During the expansion of the Reserve in 2000, the area where forestry activities were completely prohibited expanded. As a result, surrounding local communities lost their main source of income. Although local communities later became involved in the management process, their decisions/proposals are not legally recognized. The National Commission of Protected Areas is the only organization to legally make final decisions.

=== Xcaret ===
Xcaret Park is an "eco-archeological" theme park in Quintana Roo, Mexico. Xcaret features indigenous Mexican culture, combining it with around 50 theme park attractions. This destination maintains its ecotourism commitment through its extensive corporate social responsibility program, which has been in place since 2016. Specifically, Xcaret implements almost all aspects of the UN's Millennium Development Goals into various parts of their business. Moufakkir and Burns are critical of the way Xcaret has developed and used identities of various actors in Mexico and believes that this is a commodification of indigenous cultures for tourism.
