= Don Cenobio Sauza =

- Born: October 30, 1842; Jalisco, Mexico
- Died: February 15, 1909 (aged 66); Guadalajara, Mexico
- Occupation(s): Tequila Distiller, Founder of Sauza Tequila

Don Cenobio Sauza (October 30, 1842 – February 15, 1909), known to some as the "Father of Tequila,” was one of the earliest and longest lasting distillers of the tequila spirit – founding the Sauza Tequila distillery – La Perseverancia – in 1873. (Note: The original “Father of Tequila,” Don Pedro Sanchez de Tagle, began producing the distilled spirit in his hacienda, Cuisillos, in the late 1600s, almost 175 years before Sauza.)

== Early life ==
Cenobio Sauza was born on a farm in Jalisco, Mexico. He was the third child of Hilario Sauza (died 1857) and Doña Margarita Madrigal Navarro. He worked on his father’s farm together with his siblings Adelaida, Juana, Fernanda, Luis and Herminia until he was sixteen.

In 1858 Cenobio traveled to Tequila to visit his cousin Ramon Corona Madrigal. Enamored with the county, Cenobio settled in Tequila and got a job working at the distillery of José Antonio Gómez Cuervo. There he learned how to farm agave and distill mezcal-tequila wine.

== Beginning his career ==
Cenobio began to export mezcal-tequila wine from Tequila to other parts of the country. In 1870, no longer content to just sell, Sauza leased the "La Gallardeña" distillery from Lazaro Gallardo. Sauza was successful enough that three years later, on September 1, 1873 he purchased the La Antigua Cruz (The Old Cross) distillery (the oldest registered tequila distillery, founded in 1805 by José Maria Castañeda) from Don Felix Lopez for 5,000 pesos and renamed it La Perseverancia (Perseverance). The former employee of Cuervo had successfully founded Sauza Tequila – becoming one of Cuervo's great rivals.

In 1873 Sauza was the first to export tequila to the United States when he crossed through the border at El Paso del Norte (Northern Pass) carrying three casks and six jugs of his mezcal-tequila wine. This was the beginning of the export market for tequila.

== Marriage and children ==
Cenobio married Doña Margarita Muro, with whom he had seven children, all born in the city of Tequila:

- Jose Leopoldo Cenobio (born 1875)
- Alfonso Cenobio (born 1877)
- Jose Jorge Cenobio (born 1879)
- Benjamin Cenobio (born 1881)
- Eladio Cenobio (born 1883)
- Maria Graciela Cenobio (born 1885)
- Roberto Cenobio (born 1887)

== Growing Sauza Tequila ==
The arrival of the railroad in Tequila increased Sauza’s business and in 1889 he purchased the "La Gallardeña" distillery from Lazaro Gallardo. The same year he also purchased the Hacienda de San Martin de las Cañas from Vicente Orendain. This became Sauza’s headquarters and was simply known as La Hacienda. Cenobio planted more than 2 million agave and started producing about 800 casks of tequila a year at La Hacienda. He purchased and sold thirteen more distilleries and numerous fields of agave, always working at least three at a time in order to remain the leader in tequila production and sales.

Don Cenobio is credited with determining that the blue agave was the best agave for tequila in the 1890s, and others in the industry echoed his choice.

== Other enterprises ==
Cenobio’s interests extended beyond the production of tequila, including:

- During 1884 – 1885 Cenobio was the Municipal President of the Village of Tequila in the western Mexican state of Jalisco. He was succeeded by Ignacio Romero.
- In 1888 he attempted to enter the mining field.

== The final years ==
Cenobio continued to grow his tequila business until his death at age 66 in his residence in Guadalajara. His innovation and perseverance helped to create a great industry and economy for Jalisco. At his death, Cenobio left the Sauza Tequila empire in the hands of his son Don Eladio Sauza.
