= Alexander Yule =

Scottish church minister (1830–1907)

Alexander Yule (1830–1907) was a Scottish minister of the Free Church of Scotland who emigrated to Australia and rose to be Moderator of the General Assembly firstly in Victoria (in 1891) then of all Australia (1900).

== Life ==
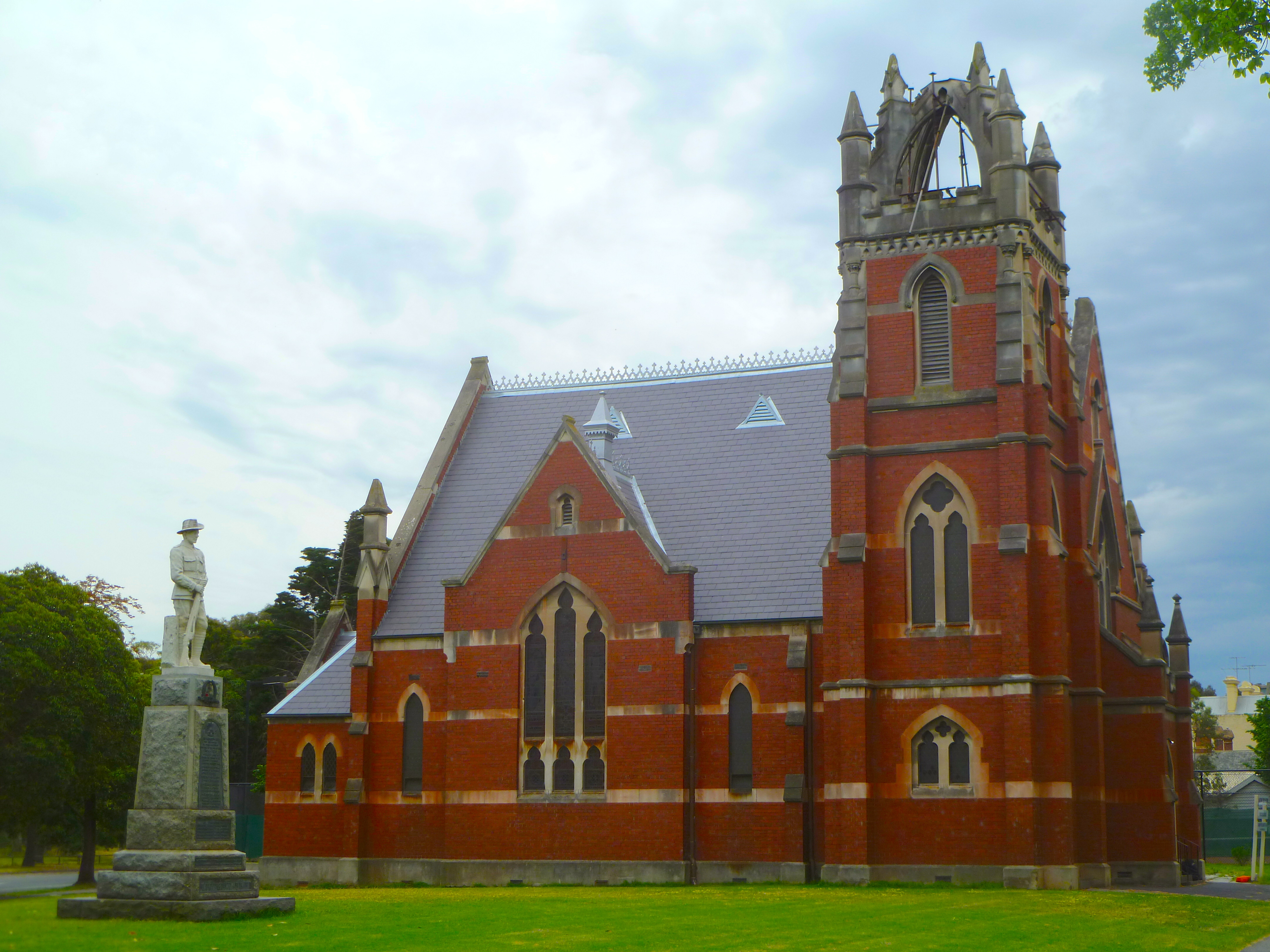
Parkville Church, Melbourne

He was born on 15 July 1830 at Craigstone in Kennethmont near Aberdeen, the son of James Yule (1790–1867) and his wife Janet Harper. He was baptised on 19 August. He studied at Aberdeen University then trained as a Free Church minister, first at the Free Church College in Aberdeen, then at New College, Edinburgh, being at the latter from 1852 to 1854.

He was ordained by the Free church of Scotland at Cargill in Perthshire in 1857. He remained there until 1867 when he then busied himself with the construction of a new church: Rutherford Free Church in Aberdeen (later renamed Rosemount Church). He was inducted there in March 1969. He resigned in 1878. In Aberdeen he lived at 12 Albert Terrace.

He emigrated to Australia in the winter of 1878/1879. On 21 January 1879 he was inducted in the Presbyterian Church of Australia at the Erskine Church in Rathdowne St. Carlton, in inner Melbourne. In 1891 he was Moderator of the Victoria Assembly.

In 1892 he was translated to the College Church in Parkville, Melbourne and remained there for the rest of his working life. He was responsible for the building of the present church, and especially its unusual tower, which echoes several Scottish crown spires, such as that on St Giles Cathedral. In 1901 he was Moderator of the Federal Assembly for all Australia, the highest position in the Presbyterian Church of Australia.

He died on 18 April 1907 at Carlton North in Victoria. Rev Duncan Stewart McEachran was one of several ministers who spoke at the funeral service. He is buried in Melbourne General Cemetery which lies close to his church.

== Publications ==
- Concerning the Answer of Prayer (1867)

== Family ==
In September 1873 he married Jane Sandison (1838–1924) in Newington, Edinburgh. She was the daughter of the late Rev John Sandison of the Free Church in Arbroath.

They had two sons: John Sandison Yule (1874–1951); and the Rev Prof Alexander Yule (1878–1952) both also moved to Australia and both died in Victoria.

His sister Jessie Yule married the Rev Charles Bell of King William's Town in South Africa.
