= Sourz =

Fruit-flavoured liqueur

Sourz logo

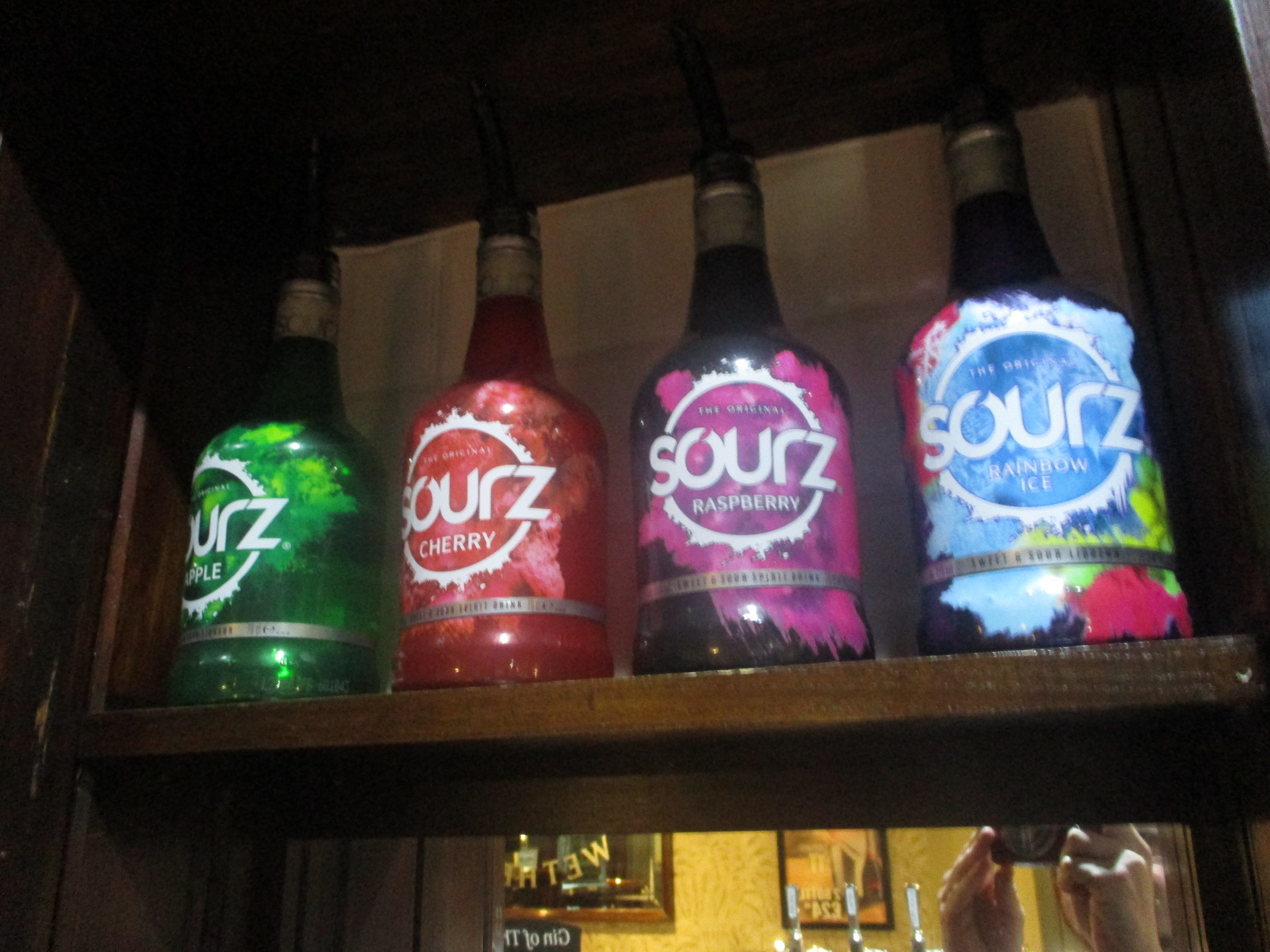
Bottles of Sourz

Sourz is a fruit-flavoured liqueur owned and produced by Suntory Global Spirits, a subsidiary of Suntory Holdings of Osaka, Japan. The liqueur is usually served as a shooter, but is also used in cocktails. It is known for being very sour.

Sourz is available in six flavours. It is 15% alcohol by volume (ABV). Previously three other permanent flavours, blackcurrant, peach and pineapple were available, however these have been discontinued.

Sourz underwent a major re-design in 2008, and the slogan "Made For Mixing" was adopted. In October 2012 a limited edition flavour, mango, was added to the range following a poll on Facebook. It was later made part of the permanent lineup.

In late 2014 there was another packaging redesign, with glow-in-the-dark ink used on the bottle to make it stand out in night clubs. A new limited edition flavour, "Rainbow Ice", was launched in 2015.
