= Kamora (brand) =

Brand of coffee liqueur produced in Mexico

- Type: Coffee liqueur
- Manufacturer: Phillips

Kamora is a brand of coffee liqueur made with coffee from Mexico. It is 20% alcohol by volume (40 proof). Formerly owned by Beam Suntory, the brand was sold to Phillips in 2021.
