= Ardmore distillery =

Scotch whisky distillery in Scotland

Coordinates: 57°21′04″N 2°44′42″W

Ardmore Distillery
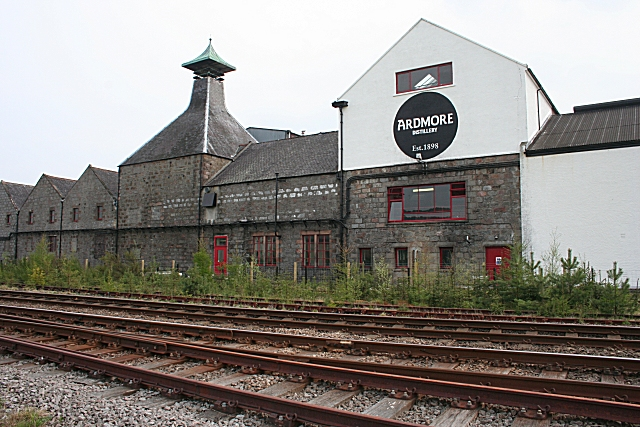
- Location: Kennethmont, Scotland, UK
- Owner: Suntory Global Spirits
- Founded: 1898
- Status: Operational
- Water source: Springs on Knockandy Hill
- No. of stills: 4 wash stills (15,000 each); 4 spirit stills (15,000 each)
- Capacity: 5,530,000 litres
- Website: www.ardmorewhisky.com

Ardmore
- Type: Single malt
- Age(s): Traditional, Triple Wood, Legacy (NAS), 12 years (Port Wood), 25 years, 30 years
- Cask type(s): American white oak ex-bourbon casks (first); quarter-casks (second); Port Wood (finish)
- ABV: 46%, 40%

Ardmore distillery is a single malt Scotch whisky distillery, located in the village of Kennethmont, Scotland. The distillery is owned and operated by Suntory Global Spirits, a subsidiary of Suntory Holdings of Osaka, Japan.

== History ==
The distillery was built in 1898 by William Teacher's son, Adam, to secure fillings for their blend, Teacher's Highland Cream (of which it remains the principal component). Two stills were added in 1955, and four more in 1974, for a total of eight. The distillery had its own maltings until the mid-1970s, and its own cooperage until the late 1980s. Until early 2001 it used coal to fire the stills.

Ardmore Traditional Cask was the distillery's single malt. It was bottled at 46% ABV, in bottles embossed with an image of a golden eagle. Unlike many single malts, barrier filtering, rather than chill filtering was used. Ardmore Traditional Cask was superseded by Ardmore Legacy in 2014, with ABV reduced to 40% and chill filtration used. This was a slightly controversial move, as many whisky enthusiasts prefer barrier-only filtration and the higher ABV, both of which help to preserve more of the malt's character and flavour. Ardmore Traditional Cask was re-launched in early 2015 as Ardmore Tradition at 46% ABV, and is now barrier filtered again. Also released since 2015 are Triple Wood and Port Wood expressions, both bottled at 46% ABV and barrier filtered only.

== Products ==
Ardmore has six distillery-bottled whiskies:

- Ardmore Traditional (Discontinued from mass market on 2014 and repackaged as travel retail)
- Ardmore Legacy (No Age Statement)
- Ardmore Tradition (No Age Statement - Travel Retail Exclusive)
- Ardmore Triple Wood (No Age Statement)
- Ardmore Port Wood Finish (12 Years Old)
- Ardmore 25 years old
