= Strong Zero =

Japanese alcoholic beverage

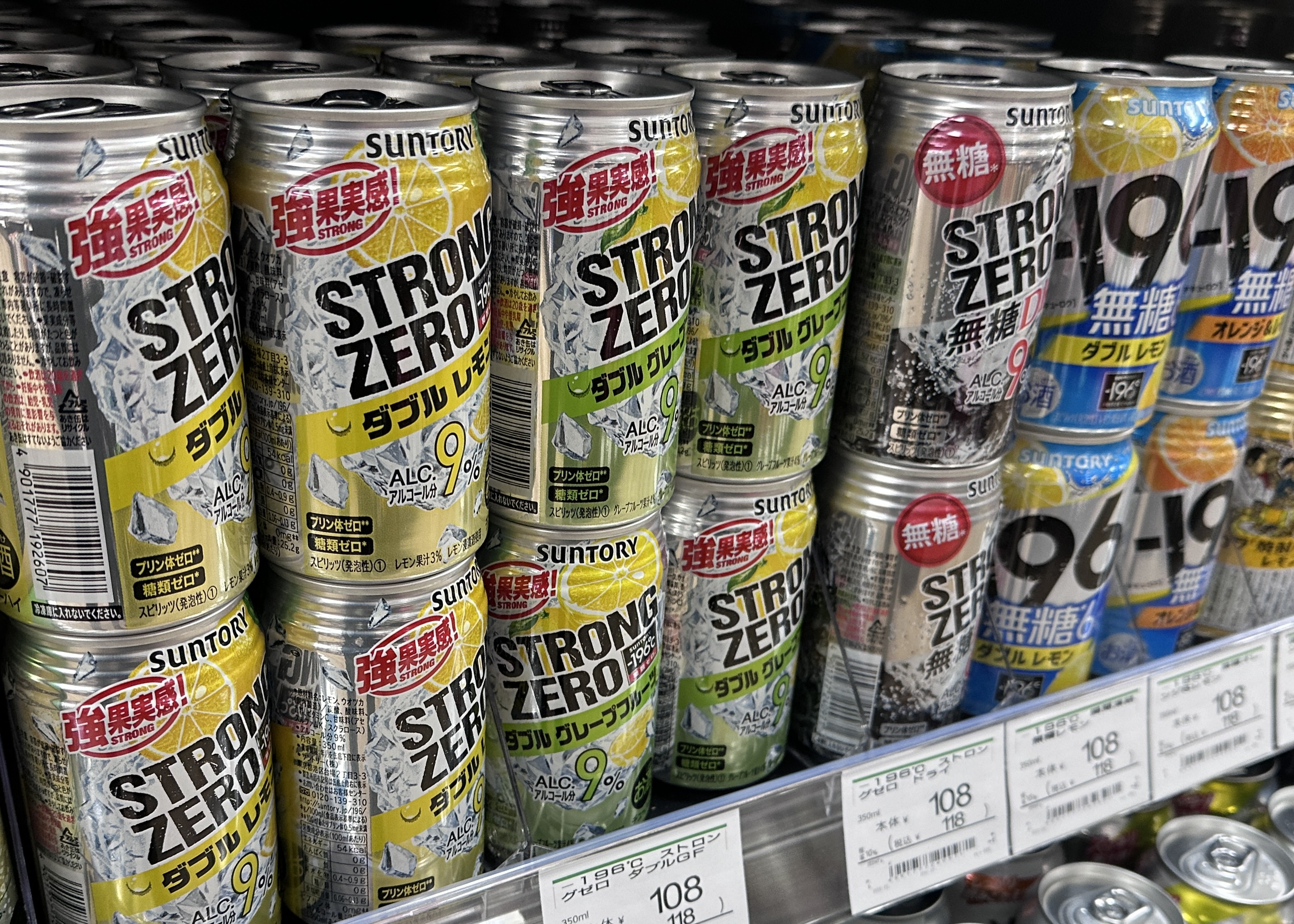
- Suntory Strong Zero
- Website: www.suntory.com/brands/196/

−196 °C Strong Zero (commonly referred to as Strong Zero or −196) is a brand of chūhai produced by Suntory Global Spirits. It is currently sold in Japan, Hong Kong, Australia, the United States, China, Canada and the United Kingdom. As with other types of chūhai, it is available in a variety of different flavors, and is often sold at convenience stores and through vending machines. The "strong" portion of the name comes from the fact that the drinks have relatively high alcohol content (9% ABV in Japan). The "zero" refers to what the manufacturer calls "sugar-free". According to nutrition labelling standards in Japan, a beverage product can be labelled as sugar-free as long as it does not exceed 0.5 g of sugar per 100 mL.

Strong Zero is made by freezing fruit in liquid nitrogen. Liquid nitrogen has a boiling point of −195.8 °C (−320 °F; 77 K), hence the "−196 °C" in the name. The frozen whole fruit is then pulverized and soaked in beverage alcohol. The final beverage contains the fruit juice, vodka and soda. The UK and Australian versions are marketed as containing Shochu in addition while this notation is lacking from the US release and is not mentioned in the version for the Japanese domestic market. The process produces a relatively low calorie and low sugar drink. As with many food and drink products available in Japan, new flavors are often released to coincide with the seasonality of different ingredients.

== Australia ==
The brand was launched in Australia in June 2021 under the name "−196", initially with a "Double Lemon" flavour packaged in 330 mL cans. The Double Lemon product has 6% ABV (1.6 Australian Standard Drinks), 0.3 g sugar, and 122 calories per can. The launch of −196 Double Lemon in Australia in 2021 was the largest launch in the Australian ready-to-drink (RTD) alcoholic beverage market in the preceding five years, and the product initially went out of stock upon its introduction. The initial launch was supported by two ads featuring Japanese characters of a sumo wrestler and a samurai warrior that play with a lemon to create the lemon juice for the premix. The ad campaign was awarded with three Australian Effie Awards in 2022.

Following the success of the Double Lemon flavour, Beam Suntory launched a "Double Grape" flavour in Australia in October 2022. The Double Grape flavour comes in the same size cans and has the same ABV, and has 122 calories and has 0.0 g of sugar per serve.

Since 2022, −196 has also been available in Double Peach flavour, as well as Double Lemon in 4.5% and 9% alcohol variants.

== United States ==
The brand launched "-196", pronounced "Minus One Nine Six", as a spin off in the United States in September 2024. While not the full strength of Strong Zero (5.5% versus the original's 9%), there are a variety of initial flavors offered: "Lemon", "Peach", and "Grapefruit", later expanding to include "Strawberry".

According to an Instagram post published on November 12, 2026, the 9% ABV version of Strong Zero is scheduled to launch in the United States in early 2027.
