= Quila, Jalisco =

Coordinates: 24°25′N 107°13′W

Quila Quila el Grande
- Interactive map of Quila
- Country: Mexico
- State: Jalisco
- Municipality: Tecolotlán
- Elevation: 1,920 m (6,300 ft)

Population (2005)
  - Total: 1,023
- Time zone: UTC-6 (Central Standard Time)
  - Summer (DST): UTC-5 (Central Daylight Time)

Quila, also known as Quila el Grande, is rural town in the municipality of Tecolotlán in the Mexican State of Jalisco. La Sierra de Quila, a nearby mountain range, was named after the town.

== Population ==
As of the INEGI census of 2005, there were 1,023 people residing in Quila. 492 of them were male, and 531 of them were female.

== Fiestas de Quila ==
Quila el Grande has its traditions. One of these takes place at the beginning of every year. Typically from the first of January to the ninth (each day pertaining to a certain family or area in the pueblo), the village celebrates the Catholic Virgin of Guadalupe. Every day, the band is met at the church by the residents and visitors to play and sing "Las Mañanitas" to the Virgen María. Later on in the afternoon, people gather at the starting part of town and form a parade with floats and Indian dances that leads the way to the Catholic church found in the middle of the village. After church, people from out of town set up carnival games, jumpers, and trampolines in the local square where later on the band begins to play. At night, toritos are usually lit, and beautiful castillos are burned in front of everyone. Some days, fireworks even light up the skies.

After January 9th from January 10th to January 14th or 15th are the Fiestas Taurinas. On these days people spend most of their days at the terraza where bands and groups are contracted to play cultural and traditional music. Birria is also served with a side of rice, beans, and tortillas in the afternoon here. Later in the evening, the band marches downtown to El Toril where the toros are held. Here is where la jaripeo comes in. Many people gather to watch beautiful horses and fierce bulls taunted by clowns and professionals?. After this, there is a dance in a salon or at the plaza which many people attend. Quila receives a lot of visitors during these fiestas.

== Climate ==
Climate data for Quila
Month	Jan	Feb	Mar	Apr	May	Jun	Jul	Aug	Sep	Oct	Nov	Dec	Year
Mean daily maximum °C (°F)	29.2 (84.6)	30.3 (86.5)	31.7 (89.1)	33.6 (92.5)	35.4 (95.7)	36 (97)	36.7 (98.1)	35.6 (96.1)	35.4 (95.7)	34.7 (94.5)	32.4 (90.3)	30.1 (86.2)	33.4 (92.1)
Mean daily minimum °C (°F)	12.7 (54.9)	12.0 (53.6)	12 (54)	14.0 (57.2)	16.7 (62.1)	21.6 (70.9)	23.7 (74.7)	23.8 (74.8)	23.5 (74.3)	20.9 (69.6)	16.5 (61.7)	13.8 (56.8)	17.6 (63.7)
Average precipitation mm (inches)	18 (0.7)	7.6 (0.3)	5.1 (0.2)	2.5 (0.1)	0 (0)	10 (0.4)	99 (3.9)	140 (5.6)	99 (3.9)	66 (2.6)	20 (0.8)	25 (1)	500 (19.5)
Source: Weatherbase
