= Tecolotlán =

- Town and municipality
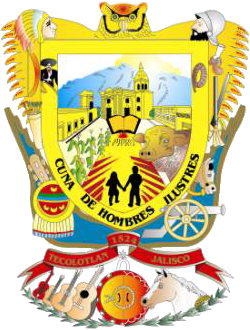
- Coat of arms

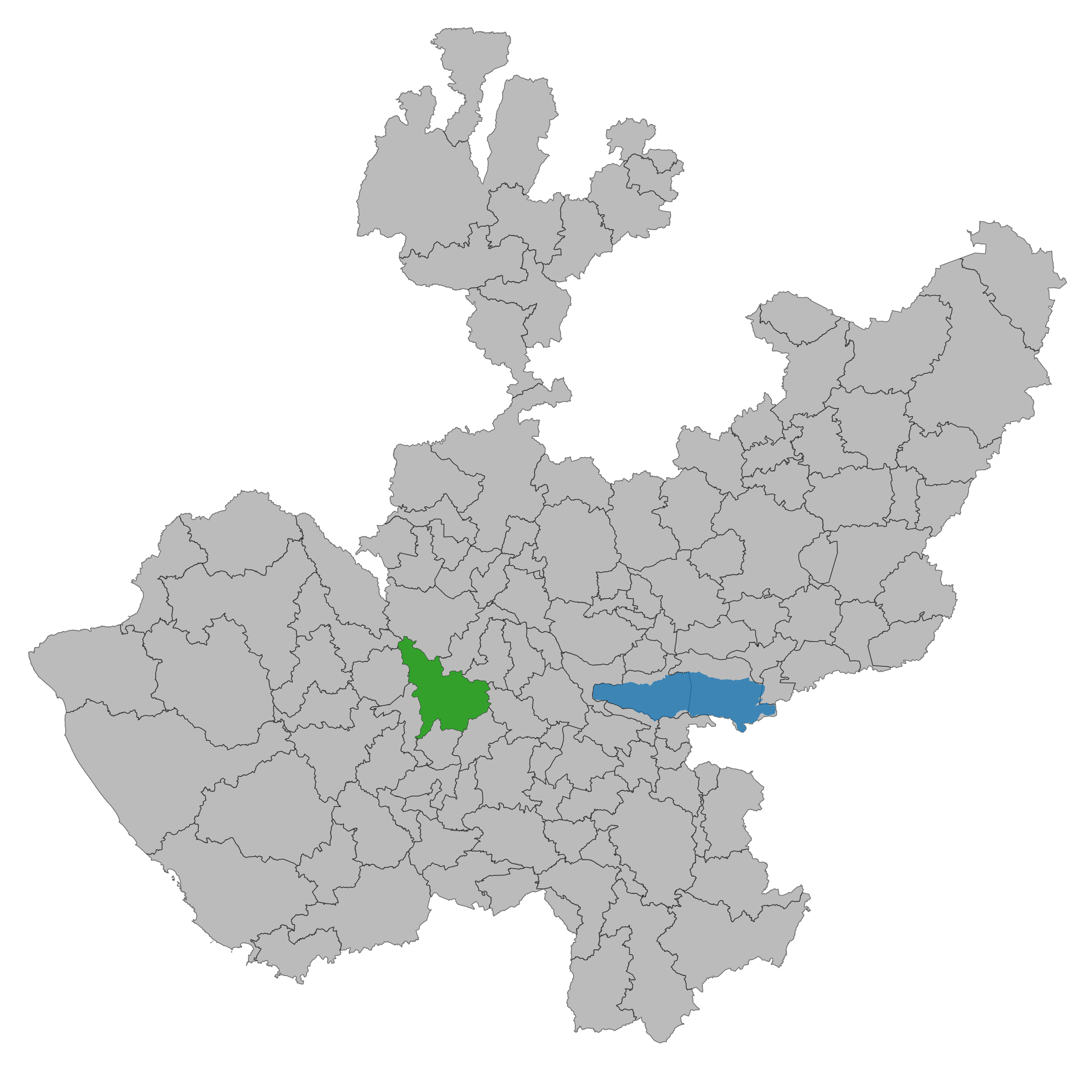
- Location of the municipality in Jalisco

- Location in Mexico
- Coordinates: 20°06′N 103°50′W
- Country: Mexico
- State: Jalisco

Area
  - Total: 765.1 km^{2} (295.4 sq mi)
  - Town: 5.69 km^{2} (2.20 sq mi)

Population (2020 census)
  - Total: 16,603
  - Density: 21.70/km^{2} (56.20/sq mi)
  - Town: 9,668
  - Town density: 1,700/km^{2} (4,400/sq mi)
- Time zone: UTC-6 (Central Standard Time)
- Website: (in Spanish) http://www.tecolotlan.gob.mx/

Tecolotlán (Nahuatl languages: Tecolotlán: "town of owls") is a town and municipality in the State of Jalisco, central-western Mexico. The municipality covers an area of 765.1 km^{2}.

As of 2005, the municipality had a total population of 14,984.

== History ==
The name of Tecolotlán derives from the words tecolote ("owl") and tlán ("town"), meaning "town of owls". The current coat of arms, formally approved of by the municipal council on 27 April 1999 ordinary, designed by Ernesto García de Alba Cruz, has a figure of an owl on it with outstretched wings representing the municipality.

At the base of the shield is the name of the municipality and its founding date of 1524 when the Spanish conquistador Francisco Cortes invaded the area of modern-day San Buenaventura. The area was placed under the command of his trustees, Pedro Gómez and Martín Monje.

The first efforts to convert the native population to Roman Catholicism took place shortly after, between 1525 and 1526 under the direction of Franciscan friar Juan de Padilla. Construction of the Sanctuaria de la Purisima to this end was started in 1526. In 1599, the convent of San Agustin de Tecolotlán was founded.

In 1825, Tecolotlán included the towns of Xuchitl and Ayotitlan, as well as farmers and ranchers from San Juan Buenavista, Quila, Tenextitlán, Agua Caliente, Santa Maria, San Jose, and Santa Rita.

A decree of July 9, 1835 formally established the municipality of Tecolotlán. However at this time the place was barely more than a small village and only 2,600 homes were recorded in 1843.

On June 23, 1844, the town hall was renovated in Tecolotlán in compliance with the decree No. 5 of the State Congress passed on April 8 of the same year.

Local legend states that during the Second Franco-Mexican War, the Free Battalion of Tecolotlán took part in the 1866 ambush of Imperialist forces under the command of French Captain Alfredo Berthelin. The French were defeated and Berthelin killed.

== The town ==
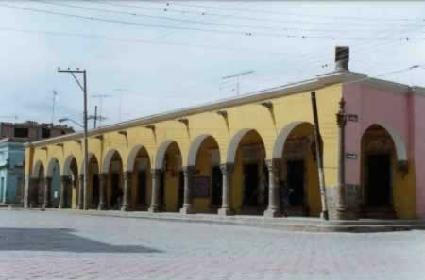
The Museo Comunitario de Tecolotlán

The town is fairly modern, and most of its residents have access to drinking water, sewage, and public restrooms. As of 2005, 89.6% of people have drinking water, 77.8% have proper sanitation and 97.5% have electricity.

The streets, markets, parking lots and sports centers in Tecolotlan are electrically lit. There are also gardens, cemeteries, and public parks. The town has a post office, telegraph office, telephones, fax, radio station, and television station.

The La Purísima Sanctuary is dedicated to the Virgin of Tecolotlán. It was built between 1821 and 1869.

The current Temple of La Santisima Trinidad dates from the 19th century, and has a three-foiled cusped arch with star and plant decorated pediment above. It was originally built as the Parish of San Agustin by the Franciscans in 1599, but when the church was rebuilt, it was dedicated to the Holy Trinity.

The Tecolotlan Cultural Center building was constructed in the mid 19th century by Serapio Pérez. Architectural elements include arches with Corinthian style capitols. The center hosts art exhibitions as well as exhibitions of fossils and other antiquities.

Carnaval is celebrated in Tecolotlan with music and dancing in the main square of town. Men traditionally serenade women, invite them to dance, and confetti-filled eggshells called cascarones are thrown. The festival lasts ten days and also includes cockfights, fireworks, and the crowning of a Carnaval Queen.

The patron saint festivities are celebrated from August 20–30, to worship the patron saints of Tecolotlán: St. Augustine and Santa Rosa de Lima. Festivities also include carnival rides such as a ferris wheel, etcetera.

== The municipality ==
Tecolotlán is located in the midwest of the state at an altitude of 1285 meters above sea level.

The municipality, which covers an area of 795.55 square kilometres is bordered on the north by the municipalities of Atengo, Ameca, and San Martín de Hidalgo, to the east by the municipalities of San Martín de Hidalgo, Cocula, Atemajac de Brizuela, and Chiquilistlan, to the south by the municipalities of Chiquilistlan, Juchitlán, and Tenamaxtlán, and to the west by the municipalities of Tenamaxtlán and Atengo.

The municipality contains 47 localities, the most important being Tecolotlán (the capital), Tamazulita, Quila, Ayotitlán, and Cofradía de Duendes.

=== Topography ===
The municipal area is in a valley between hills to the north and southeast, ranging from 1,200 to 2,400 meters. The hills include El Huehuentón (at 2000 metres), El Pichacho (at 1,700 metres), and others such as Cerro del Colotepec, Salto Colorado, El Tecolote, El Carrizal, La Coronilla, La Ventana. Cuchillos, Prieto, and Picachitos.

=== Hydrography ===
A seasonally dry segment of the Tecolotlán river flows through the town of Tecolotlán. The largest river in the district is the Ferrería River, which has a number of tributary streams such as El Jabalí, Gallinero, Tamazula, Tecolotlán, Las Canoas, Colorado, Cofradía, Sauz, and the Amarillo.

The San Pedro Dam is located to the south of the municipality. Other water features include the El Pochote dam, Tecolotán waterfall, Salto de Santa Rosa, Salto de La Campana, Salto del Venado, Salto Seco, and Salto de La Disciplina.

=== Flora and fauna ===
The municipality is covered with 30,900 hectares of pine and oak forests with some fruit trees. In the Sierra de Quila near the towns of Tenamaxtlan, Ameca, Atengo, and San Martin Hidalgo, there is a tree named the Arbol de la Lira (Lyre Tree) which is approximately 600 years old. It is protected by the state environmental agency. The forest that surrounds the tree covers about 15,000 hectares and is guarded 24 hours a day.

This forest is also home to the Cienega spring, which is surrounded by vegetation and has a monitoring station nearby. Animals that inhabit this region are deer, badger, raccoon, wolves, foxes, coyotes, rabbits, and some small reptiles and a variety of birds.

=== Protected Natural Areas ===
Protected natural areas in the municipality include La Ciénega spring, Las Juntas, Las Piedras de Quila, and Sierra de Quila. There is also a notable palaeontological site at Gliptodonte; many unearthed artifacts are located within the "Museo Comunitario" in the main town.

=== Climate ===
The climate is moderately warm and semi-dry, and dry in the autumn and winter with an average annual temperature is 23 °C., with a maximum of 31 °C. and minimum of 15 °C.

The rainfall falls heaviest in June and July, and a total of 773.1 mm is received annually on average. Prevailing winds approach from the south.

=== Transportation ===
The main road in the municipality for transportation is via the Guadalajara–Barra de Navidad, 107 kilometres from the state capital. Private vehicles are the primary method of travel in the region.

=== Attractions ===
The area does not have a highly developed tourist industry, but opportunities for ecotourism activities such as mountain biking, horseback riding, and camping are available. The Sierra de Quila and other natural features provide scenic landscapes and views.

There are two principle dams with artificial lakes, the Presa del Ahogado and the Presa del Pochote. Both have facilities for camping and picnicking, as well as docks for boating and fishing. The Presa del Pochote is particularly popular with residents of the nearby city of Guadalajara.

=== Religion ===
The main religion is Roman Catholicism, and notable Roman Catholic chapels and parishes within the municipality include the Parroquia del Sagrado Corazón, Santuario de la Purísima, Capilla de San José, Ermita de San Genaro, Capilla de la Cruz Verde, Capilla del Señor del Socorro, Capilla de San José María Robles, and the Parroquia de la Virgencita.

== Economy ==
The economy is largely based in agriculture and ranching. Livestock reared include beef, goats, horses, pigs, and honeybees. Some of the regions' livestock produce dairy products, such as cheese and cream. Fishermen catch carp and bass in the rivers and lakes.

Crops grown in the region include corn, chickpeas, alfalfa, peaches, avocado, mango, and pitayas. As of 2005 there were approximately 30,900 hectares of forest. Some segments of these forests are logged for oak and pine wood.

The municipality produces basketry, pottery, clay pots, and wooden furniture. There is also some manufacturing and mining activity, with lime and cement factories and mining of barite, lime, limestone, marble, and quartz.

== Government ==
=== Municipal presidents ===
Municipal president	Term	Political party	Notes
Ramón Ventura y Moreno	1822		
José Máximo de Agraz	1823–1824		
José María Ramírez Miranda	1825–1826		
Guadalupe Padilla	1827		
Ramón Ventura y Moreno	1828		
José Abundio de Medina	1829–1832		
Guadalupe Valadez	1833–1834		
José María Ramírez Miranda	1835		
Justo Francisco de Puga	1836		
José María Ramírez Miranda	1837–1843		
Justo Francisco de Puga	1844		
José Ignacio Brambila	1845		
Francisco Mérida	1846		
Esteban Soltero	1847		
Fernando Pérez	1848		
Pedro Cueva	1849		
Juan C. Agraz	1850		
Justo Merino	1851		
Rafael Ramírez	1852–1855		
Serapio Pérez	1856		
Juan C. Agraz	1857		
Emeterio Merino	1858–1859		
Serapio Pérez	1860–1863		
Gregorio Pérez	1864		
José Ma. Agraz	1865		
José Ma. García de Alba	1866		
Luis G. Cueva	1867		
Gregorio M. Medina	1868		
Manuel Huezo	1869		
José Ma. Agraz	1870		
Arcadio Villaseñor	1870		
Secundino Soltero	1870		
Abundio Medina	1870		
José Ma. Agraz	1871		
Cayetano Gómez	1871		
Clemente Fernández	1871		
Miguel Amaya	1871		
Cayetano Gómez	1872		
Rómulo Ramírez	1872		
Cipriano Soltero	1872		
Jesús Merino	1872		
Leocadio Gómez	1872		
Guillermo Torres	1872		
Salvador Alcalá	1873		
Guillermo Torres	1873		
Arcadio Torres	1873		
Luis G. Cueva	1873		
José Ma. García de Alba	1873		
Cipriano Soltero	1873		
Miguel Amaya	1874		
Cayetano Gómez	1874–1875		
Jesús Merino	1875–1876		
Guillermo Torres	1876		
José Merino	1877		
Guillermo Torres	1877		
Manuel Gómez de la Fuente	1878		
Ignacio Álvarez	1878		
José Merino	1878		
José Ma. Cueva García	1879		
Manuel Gómez de la Fuente	1879		
Ignacio Álvarez	1879		
Simón Martínez	1880		
José Merino	1880		
Cayetano Gómez	1880		
Simón Martínez	1881		
Reyes B. Ramírez	1881		
Juan C. Nava	1881		
Reyes B. Ramírez	1882		
Arcadio Villaseñor	1882		
Cayetano Gómez	1882		
Arcadio Villaseñor	1883		
Arcadio Torres	1883		
Cayetano Gómez	1883		
Ignacio Álvarez	1883		
Arcadio Torres	1884		
Ignacio Gómez Medina	1884		
Jesús Merino	1884–1885		
Mariano Preciado	1885		
Cayetano Gómez	1886		
Mariano Preciado	1886		
Laureano Soltero	1886		
Cayetano Gómez	1887		
Leocadio Gómez	1887		
José M. Merino	1887		
Ignacio Álvarez	1887		
Lucio Santana	1887–1888		
Ignacio Álvarez	1888		
Jesús Santana Cueva	1888		
Juan C. Nava	1888		
Jesús Merino	1888		
Arcadio Villaseñor	1889		
Jesús Merino	1889		
Arcadio Villaseñor	1890		
Esteban García de Alba	1890		
Marcos E. Cueva	1890		
Pedro Ramírez	1890		
Juan Gómez García	1890		
Jesús Merino	1891		
José Ma. Merino	1891		
Abraham Pérez	1891		
Marcos E. Cueva	1891		
Abraham Pérez	1892		
José Ma. Merino	1892		
Gregorio Medina	1892		
Arcadio Villaseñor	1893		
Ignacio Gómez Medina	1893		
Gregorio Medina	1893		
Arcadio Villaseñor	1894		
Ignacio M. Medina	1894		
Gregorio Medina	1894		
Mariano Preciado	1894		
Arcadio Villaseñor	1895		
Mariano Preciado	1895		
Ignacio Gómez Medina	1895		
Mariano Preciado	1896		
Jesús Santa Cueva	1896		
Ruperto García de Alba	1896		
Arcadio Villaseñor	1897		
Mariano Preciado	1898		
Jesús Santana C.	1898		
Tomás García de Alba	1899		
Clemente Fernández	1899		
Félix Agraz Villaseñor	1899		
Ignacio Gómez Medina	1900		
Marcos E. Cueva	1900		
Arcadio Villaseñor	1900		
Félix Agraz V.	1900–1901		
Marcos E. Cueva	1901		
Mariano Preciado	1901		
Abraham Pérez	1901		
Marcos E. Cueva	1902		
José Ma. Cueva Gómez	1902		
Esteban De A.	1902		
Tomás García de Alba	1903		
José E. Ramírez	1903		
Mariano Preciado	1904		
Tomás García de Alba	1905		
Clemente Fernández	1905		
Ruperto García de Alba	1905		
Ignacio Gómez Medina	1906		
Marcos E. Cueva	1906		
Antonio L. Villaseñor	1906		Political deputy director
Melesio de Anda	1907		
Ruperto García de Alba	1907		
Marcos E. Cueva	1907		
Ignacio Gómez Medina	1908		
Ruperto García de Alba	1908		
Marcos E. Cueva	1908		
Ignacio Gómez Medina	1909		
Ruperto García de Alba	1909		
Manuel Camargo	1910		Political deputy director
Esteban Cueva Zepeda	1910		
José Ma. Merino	1910		
Juan C. Zepeda	1910		
Hilario Villaseñor	1911		
Ruperto García de Alba	1911		
Esteban Cueva Zepeda	1911		
Juan Agraz Brambila	1911		
S. Arreola	1911		Political deputy director
Alberto Ponce de León	1912		
S. Arreola	1912		
Francisco R. Aguilar	1912		
José Enrique Agraz	1912		
Porfirio Cueva Zepeda	1912		
Porfirio Villaseñor	1913		
Antonio N. Naredo	1913		
Juan E. Santana	1913		
Juan Ángel Agraz Brambila	1913		
Jacinto Gómez	1914		
Enrique Villaseñor	1914		
Juan Ángel Agraz Brambila	1914		
Jacinto Gómez	1915		
Juan Ángel Agraz Brambila	1915		
Jacinto Gómez	1916		
Reyes B. Ramírez	1916–1917		
Ángel S. Agraz	1918		
Serbando Rueda	1918		
Luis Ramírez	1918		
Froilán Rodríguez	1918		
Vicente Santana	1918		
Froilán Rodríguez	1919		
Pedro García de Alba	1919		
Ignacio Gómez Medina	1920		
Salvador G. Villaseñor	1920		
Porfirio Villaseñor	1920		
Jacinto Gómez	1920		Vice
Juan Ángel Agraz Brambila	1920		
Jacinto Gómez	1921		
Porfirio Villaseñor	1921		Vice
Santiago Lepe	1921		
Salvador G. Villaseñor	1922		
Francisco L. Preciado	1922		
Salvador G. Villaseñor	1923		
Francisco L. Preciado	1923		
Juan García de Alba	1923		
Salvador G. Villaseñor	1924		
Cesáreo Hernández	1924		
E. Montaño	1924		
Tranquilino Hernández	1924		
Luis Ramírez	1924		
J. Gómez Medina	1924		
Julián Muñoz	1924–1925		
José C. Zúñiga	1925		
Tranquilino Hernández	1925		
Jesús Flores Villaseñor	1925–1926		
Juan Ángel Agraz Brambila	1926		
José F. Peregrina	1926		
Pánfilo Ruelas	1926		
Amado Lepe	1927		
J. Jesús Gómez	1927		
José Peregrina	1927		
Santiago Huezo	1927		
Porfirio Villaseñor	1928		
Fernando Aguilar	1928		
Olivio Fernández	1929		
Francisco Serrano	1929		
Epigmenio G. Robles	1929		
Elpidio González	1929		
Fernando Águila	1929		
Luis Soltero Gómez	1929		
Porfirio Villaseñor	1929	PNR	
Antonio Escamilla	1930–1931	PNR	
Luis Ramírez	1931	PNR	
Natalio Santana	1932	PNR	
Arturo Merino	1932	PNR	
Luis Villaseñor	1933	PNR	
Abraham Ramírez	1934–1935	PNR	
Natalio Santana	1936	PNR	
Lucio García	1936	PNR	
Cruz Santana	1937	PNR	
Francisco Partida R.	1938	PRM	
Juan Zolórzano	1939	PRM	
Guadalupe Gómez	1939	PRM	
Fidencio Bustos	1940	PRM	
Román Hernández	1940	PRM	
Salvador Ramírez	1941–1942	PRM	
Ernesto Camacho	1943	PRM	
Aurelio López	1944	PRM	
Olivio Fernández	1945	PRM	
Clemente Fernández	1946	PRI	
Aurelio López	1947	PRI	
Guadalupe Ramírez	1948	PRI	
Florencio Torres	1948	PRI	
Gumersindo Sedano	1949	PRI	
Bernardo Preciado	1950	PRI	
Gumersindo Sedano	1950–1952	PRI	
Roberto Ramírez Villaseñor	1953–1955	PRI	
Eraclio Soltero Cobián	1956–1958	PRI	
Everardo Preciado Vera	1959–1960	PRI	
Vicente Jiménez Luquín	1961	PRI	
Francisco Vera Cueva	1962–1964	PRI	
Constantino Vázquez Castillo	1965–1967	PRI	
Carlos Cueva Pimienta	1968–1970	PRI	
Juan Cobián Guzmán	1971–1973	PRI	
Abel Cueva Pimienta	1974–1976	PRI	
Tomás Cueva Cueva	1977–1979	PRI	
Salvador Canales Núñez	1980–1982	PRI	
Gabriel Cueva López	1983–1985	PRI	
Manuel Rosas Gutiérrez	1986–1988	PRI	
Heriberto Santana Rubio	1989–1992	PRI	
J. Jesús Ortega Santana	1992	PRI	Acting municipal president
Víctor Manuel Ramírez Soltero	1992–1995	PRI	
Sixto Cueva del Castillo	1995	PRI	Acting municipal president
Antonio Rubio Flores	1995	PRI	
Ricardo Ramírez López	1996–1997	PRI	Acting municipal president
Rito García Lepe	01-01-1998–31-12-2000	PRI	
José Bernardo Preciado Flores	01-01-2001–31-12-2003	PAN	
Cuitláhuac Ignacio Arias Merino	01-01-2004–31-12-2006	PRI	
Alberto Espinosa Sauza	01-01-2007–31-12-2009	PRI	
Juan León Gil	01-01-2010–30-09-2012	PRI; Panal	Coalition "Alliance for Jalisco"
Francisco Javier Brambila González	01-10-2012–30-09-2015	PRI; PVEM	Coalition "Compromise for Jalisco"
Juan Manuel María Capistrán	01-10-2015–30-09-2018	PAN	
Ricardo Ramírez Ruelas	01-10-2018–30-09-2021	PRI	
Arturo Eliud Saldaña Vázquez	01-10-2021–	PRI	

== Notable people ==
- Juan Salvador Agraz – Chemical engineer, founder of the National School of Chemical Science (now, Faculty of Chemistry in the National Autonomous University of Mexico (UNAM).
- Gabriel Agraz García de Alba – Historian.
- Ruperto García de Alba – General and acting governor of Jalisco, 1930-1931.
- Esteban García de Alba Larios – Attorney at Law, politician, president of the Mexican Senate during the government of Manuel Ávila Camacho. Founder of Pensiones del Estado de Jalisco. He built several multi-family homes, some of them in Tlatelolco. Ambassador representing Mexico before the League of Nations.
- Ana Bertha Lepe – actress and Miss Mexico in 1954.
