= Suntory =

Japanese beverage company

Suntory Holdings Limited

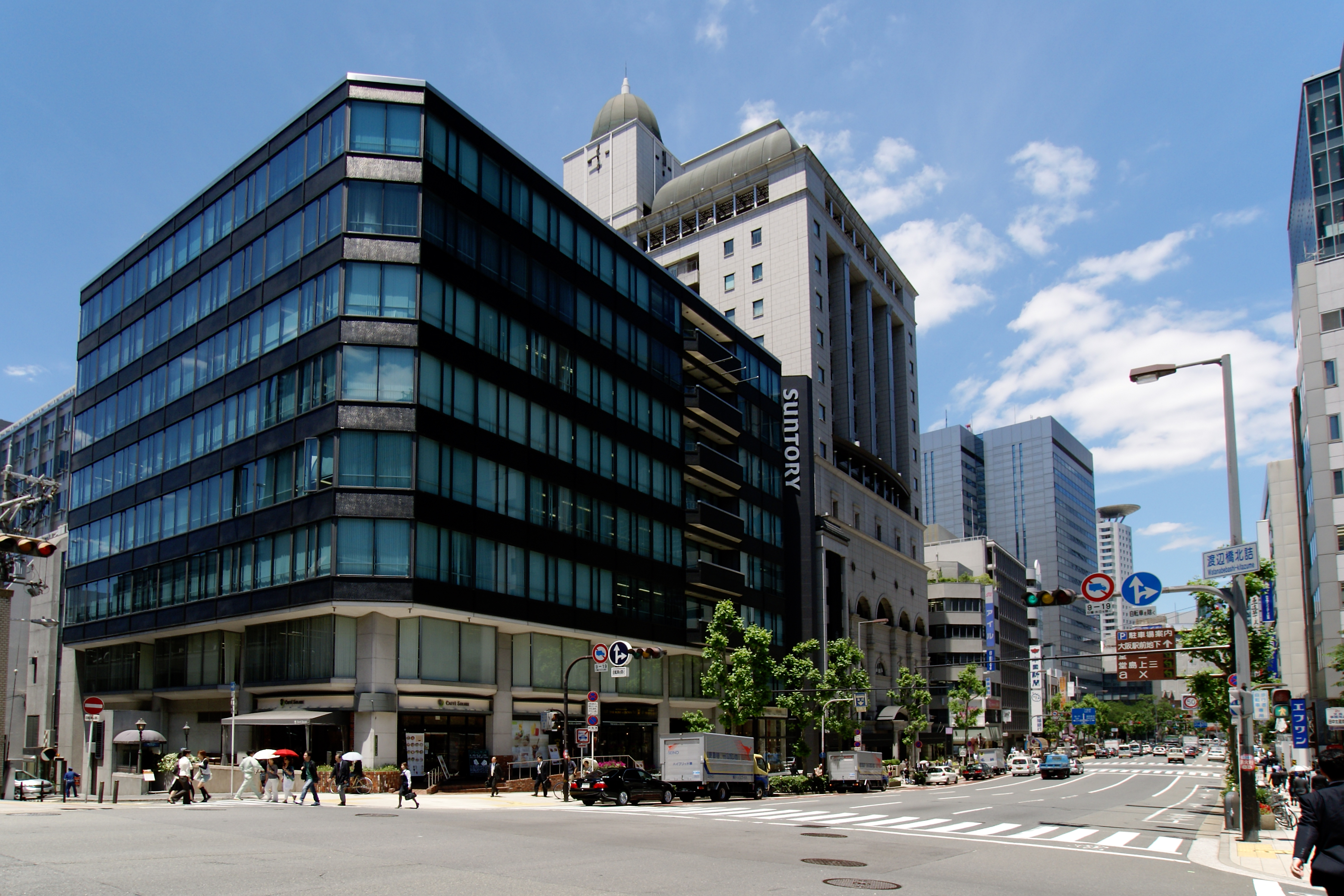
- Headquarters in Kita-ku, Osaka
- Native name: サントリーホールディングス株式会社
- Romanized name: Santorī Hōrudingusu Kabushiki-gaisha
- Formerly: Kotobukiya Co., Ltd. (1921-1963); Suntory Limited (1963-2009)
- Type: Private
- Industry: Beverage
- Founded: 1899; 127 years ago
- Founder: Shinjirō Torii
- Headquarters: Dojima, Kita-ku, Osaka, Japan
- Key people: Nobuhiro Torii (President)
- Revenue: ▲¥3.417 trillion (2024); ¥3.285 trillion (2023)
- Operating income: ▲¥329 billion (2024); ¥317 billion (2023)
- Net income: ▲¥238 billion (2024); ¥228 billion (2023)
- Total assets: ▲¥6.331 trillion (2024); ¥6.042 trillion (2,023)
- Owner: Torii and Saji families (founding family)
- Parent: Kotobuki Realty Co., Ltd. (89.5%)
- Subsidiaries: Suntory Spirits; Suntory Global Spirits; Suntory Beverage & Food; Suntory Wellness; Suntory Flowers
- Website: suntory.com
- Footnotes; Kotobuki Realty is an asset management company owned by key members of the Torii and Saji families and by three nonprofit organizations (public interest incorporated foundations) that are practically governed by the families.

Suntory Holdings Limited (Note: Japanese: サントリーホールディングス株式会社, Hepburn: Santorī Hōrudingusu Kabushiki-gaisha) is a Japanese multinational brewing and distilling company. Established in 1899, it is one of the oldest companies in the distribution of Western-style alcoholic beverages in Japan and one of the largest drinks companies in the world following its acquisition of Beam, Inc. in 2014.

Suntory produces a number of well-known alcohol and soft drink brands, including Jim Beam, Lucozade, Orangina, Maker's Mark, Ribena, and a range of Japanese whiskies. The company is headquartered in Osaka and employs 40,000 people globally.

== History ==
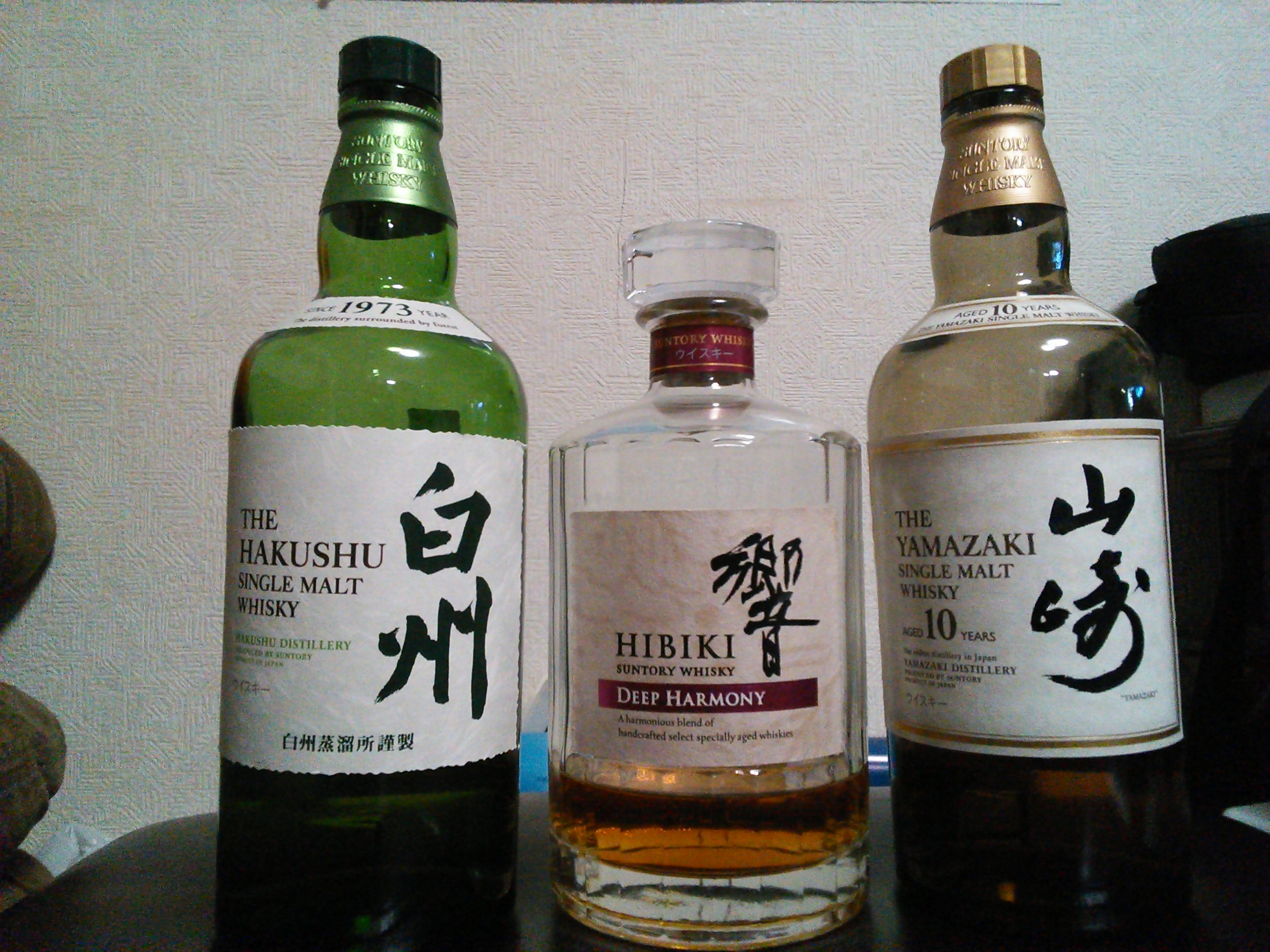
From left to right: Hakushu, Hibiki, Yamazaki; Japanese whiskies from Suntory

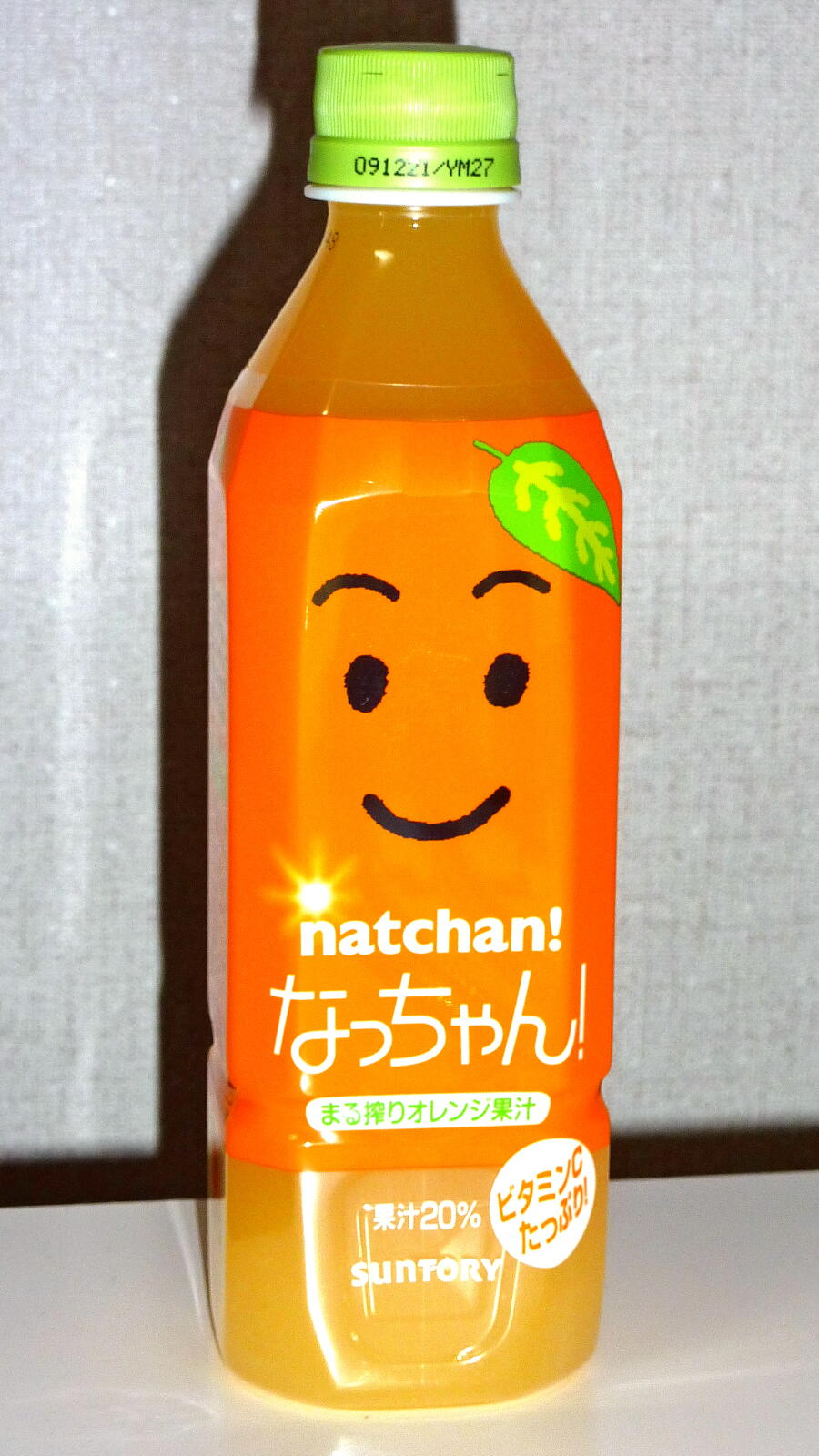
Orange juice soft drink from Suntory

Suntory was founded by Shinjirō Torii, (Note: 鳥井 信治郎, Torii Shinjirō) who first opened his store, Torii Shōten (Note: 鳥井商店) (lit. "Torii store"), in Osaka on February 1, 1899, to sell imported wines. In 1907, the shop began selling a fortified wine called Akadama port wine (Akadama literally meaning "red ball", a byname for the sun). The store became the Kotobukiya company in 1921 to further expand its business and in 1923, Torii built Japan's first malt whisky distillery Yamazaki Distillery.

Although shortages during World War II forced Kotobukiya to halt new product development, the company successfully re-released Torys Whisky in 1946, which sold well in post-war Japan. In 1961, Kotobukiya launched the "Drink Torys and Go to Hawaii" campaign. At the time, a trip abroad was considered a once-in-a-lifetime opportunity. In 1963, Kotobukiya changed its name to "Suntory", taken from the name of the whisky it produces, which itself was derived from the English "sun" (referencing Akadama) + Tory, the anglicized version of Torii's name. In the late 2000s, Suntory was widely reported to have revived domestic demand for blended whisky by promoting the whisky highball as an everyday, meal-compatible drink, supported by standardized "highball" dispensing practices and dedicated on-premise promotion.

On April 1, 2009, Suntory transitioned into a stockholding company named Suntory Holdings Limited, (Note: サントリーホールディングス株式会社) establishing several new entities: Suntory Beverage and Food Limited, (Note: サントリー食品株式会社) Suntory Products Limited, (Note: サントリープロダクツ株式会社) Suntory Wellness Limited, (Note: サントリーウェルネス株式会社) Suntory Liquors Limited, (Note: サントリー酒類株式会社) Suntory Beer & Spirits Limited, (Note: サントリービア&スピリッツ株式会社) Suntory Wine International Limited, (Note: サントリーワインインターナショナル株式会社) and Suntory Business Expert Limited. (Note: サントリービジネスエキスパート株式会社)

On July 14, 2009, Kirin announced merger negotiations with Suntory; however, the two companies terminated these discussions on February 8, 2010. That same year, Suntory acquired Orangina-Schweppes, owner of the Orangina soft drink, for 300 billion yen, and Frucor energy drinks for 600 million euros.

On July 2, 2013, the company's beverage and food division debuted on the Tokyo stock exchange raising almost US$4 billion in the process. In September 2013, Suntory purchased the drinks division of GlaxoSmithKline, a deal that included the brands Lucozade and Ribena, though not Horlicks.

In January 2014, Suntory announced an agreement to buy the largest U.S. bourbon producer, Beam Inc. (producers of Jim Beam) for US$16 billion. This deal would make Suntory the world's third largest spirits maker. The acquisition was completed in April 2014, and the new subsidiary was renamed Beam Suntory.

In December 2016, Beam Suntory acquired the gin maker Sipsmith. A year later, Suntory and PepsiCo formed a joint venture in Thailand.

In 2018, Suntory sold most of Cerebos Pacific's assets, including Australian and New Zealand food business, to Kraft Heinz for A$290 million. This transaction excluded Cerebos Pacific's health supplements and fresh coffee business, which were later integrated into Suntory Beverage & Food Asia Pte. Ltd. and Suntory Coffee Australia, respectively.

In recent leadership changes, in March 2023, Makiko Ono became the first woman to be appointed CEO of Suntory Beverage & Food Ltd. In May 2024, Beam Suntory was rebranded as Suntory Global Spirits including the launch of a new website and visual identity.

Nobuhiro Torii, great-grandson of founder Shinjirō Torii, was appointed as president of Suntory Holdings beginning March 2025, with incumbent president Takeshi Niinami appointed as its chairman. However, in September 2025, Takeshi Niinami resigned as the company's chairman following an investigation into the purchase of possibly illegal supplements.

== Subsidiaries ==
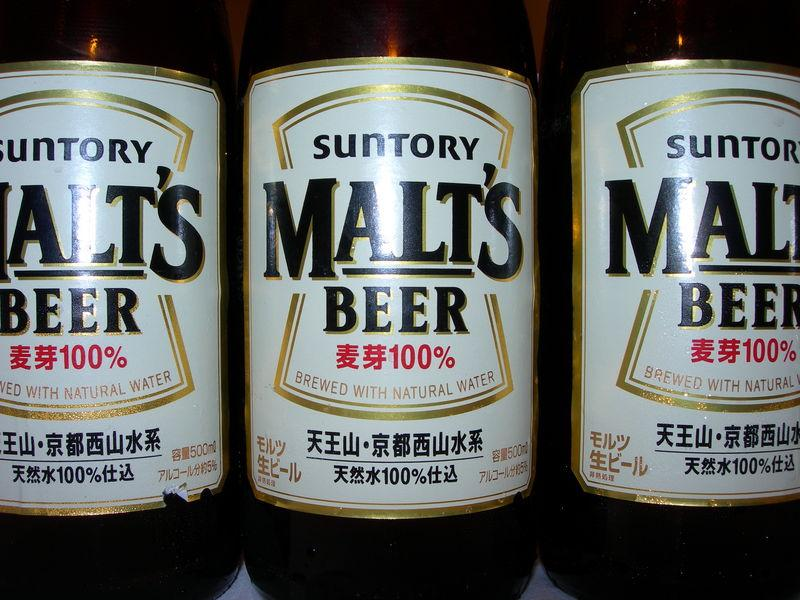
Suntory Malt's beer

- Château Lagrange S.A.S
- Florigene Pty Ltd
- Gold Knoll Ltd
- Grupo Restaurante Suntory Mexico
- Morrison Bowmore Distillers, Limited
- Orangina
- Pepsi Bottling Ventures LLC
- Suntory Beverage & Food Asia Pte. Ltd.
- Suntory Global Spirits
- Suntory Oceania
- Suntory PepsiCo Vietnam Beverage Co., Ltd (joint venture with PepsiCo)
- Subway Japan
- Tipco F&B Co., Ltd

== Joint ventures ==
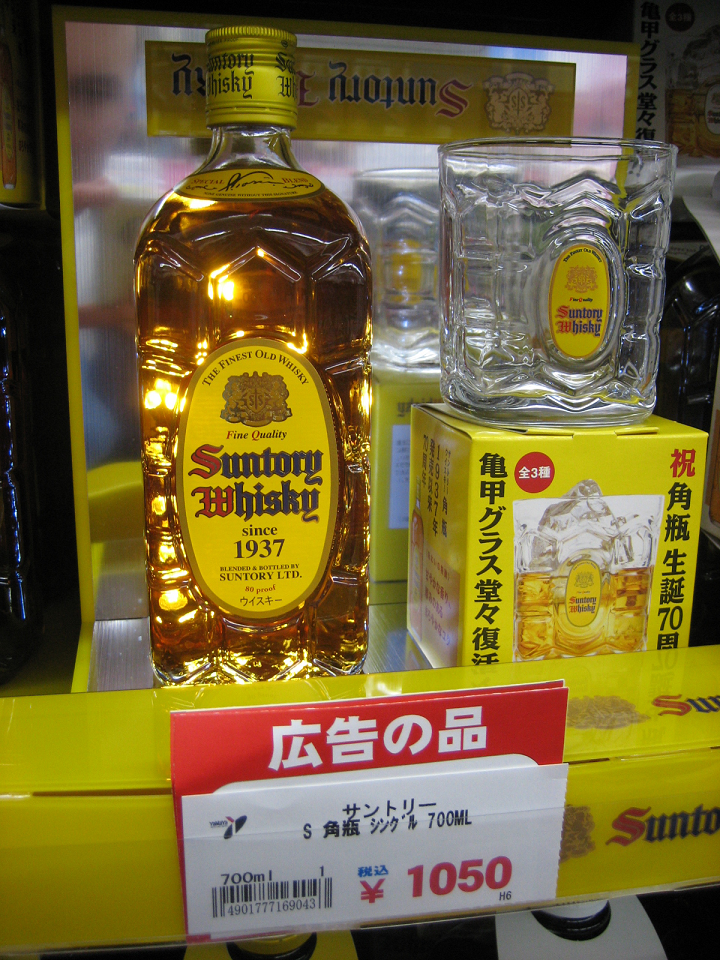
A Suntory Kakubin ('angled bottle') whisky bottle and glass on display at a liquor store in Iizaka, Japan

Beginning in the early 1990s, Suntory collaborated with Melbourne biotechnology firm Florigene to genetically engineer a true blue rose, a symbol often associated with the impossible or unattainable. While Florigene had been a subsidiary of the agrochemicals company Nufarm since 1999, Suntory acquired a 98.5% equity stake in the firm in 2003. By 2004, Suntory and Florigene scientists announced the development of the first roses containing blue pigment. Since then, they have produced a range of genetically modified flowers expressing colors in the blue spectrum, as well as other desirable traits such as an extended vase life for cut flowers.

In July 2011, Suntory Beverage and Food Limited formed a joint venture with PT GarudaFood in Indonesia to produce non-alcoholic beverages such as Suntory Oolong Tea, Boss, and Orangina. Suntory maintains a majority 51% stake in the venture.

In April 2019, Suntory partnered with Drinkripples, an Israeli-based company. As part of the collaboration, Suntory utilizes "Ripple Maker" machines to print branded content onto beer foam at select venues throughout Japan.

== Brands ==
=== Soft drinks ===
Suntory manufactures and sells soft drinks such as Suntory Ade, Suntory Oolong Tea, NCAA, Iyemon and the Natchan series becoming one of Japan's leading beverage companies. In October 1997, they collaborated with American beverage company PepsiCo to handle PepsiCo's soft drinks products such as Pepsi and Mountain Dew for the Japanese market. Following the transition to a holding company structure, " Suntory Foods International Limited " (originally "Suntory Foods Limited") was established as the managing company for the manufacturing and sales of the soft drink business. Furthermore, the majority of the sales division of this business was transferred to its subsidiary, Suntory Foods Limited (Tokyo).

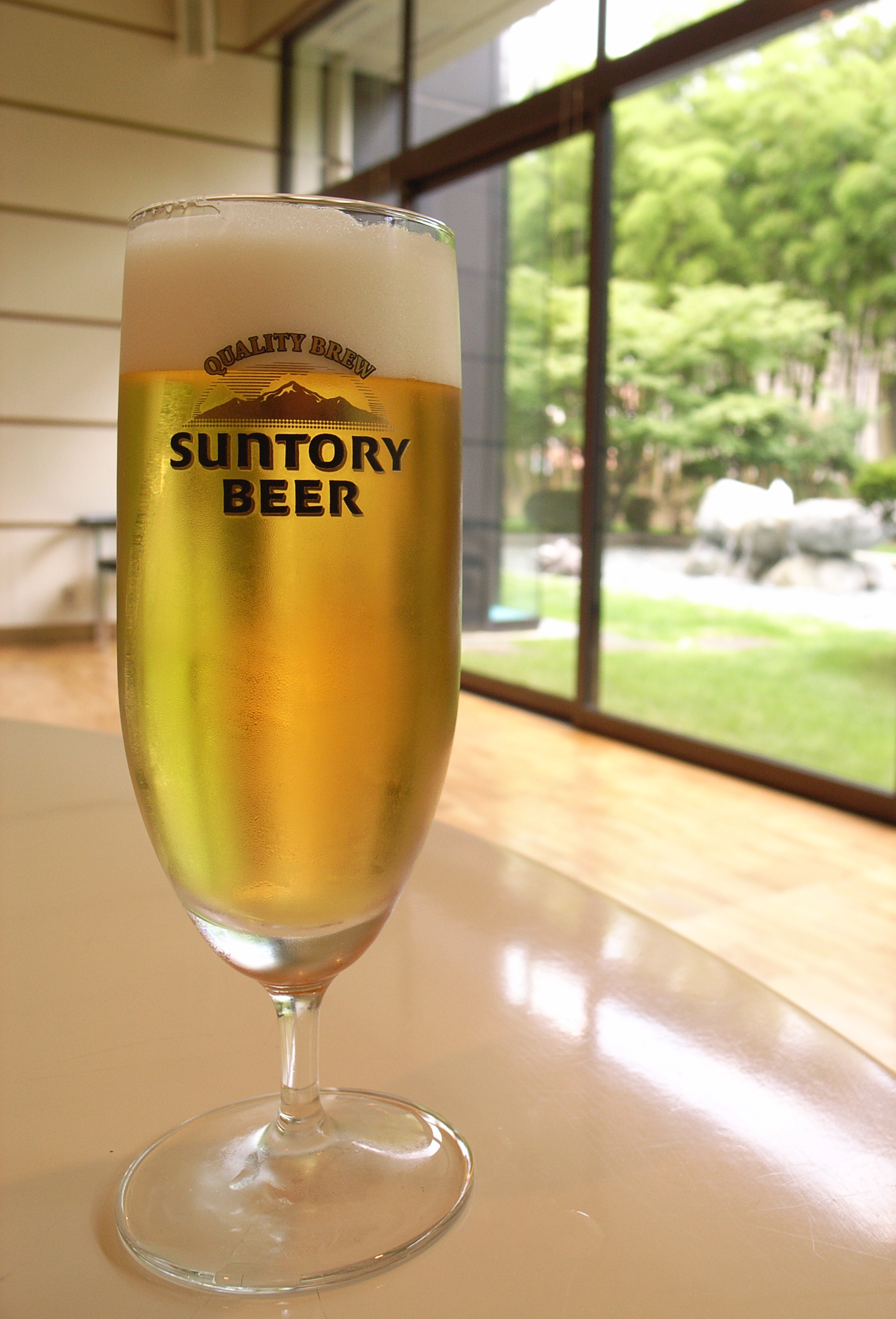
Malt's beer served at Suntory's Kyoto brewery

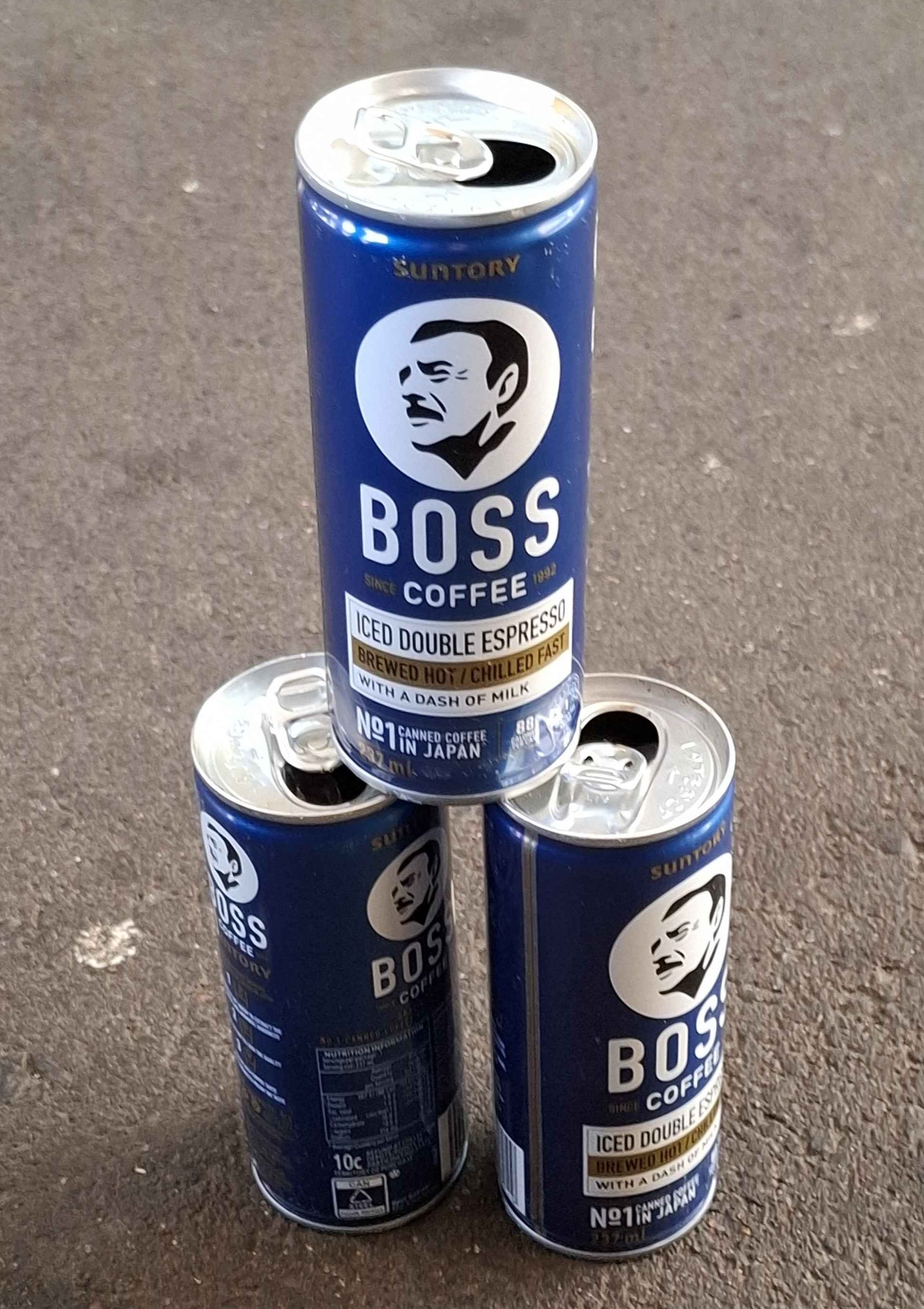
Boss Coffee, Suntory's brand of canned coffee

Suntory beverage brands include:

- Soft drinks: Bikkle, Boss Coffee, C.C. Lemon, Calcium and Iron Beverage, Gini, Green DAKARA, Iyemon, Lucozade, MayTea, Mizone, Nature's Twist, Nope, Oasis, Okky, Iced Oolong Tea, Orangina, Ribena, Schweppes, TEA+, Tennensui, V, Pepsi Special
- Beer: All-Free, Kin-Mugi, The Premium Malt's
- Gin: Larios, Sipsmith, Roku
- Liqueur: DeKuyper, Midori, Sourz
- Rum: Cruzan
- Tequila: El Tesoro de Don Felipe, Hornitos, Sauza, Tres Generaciones, 100 Años
- Vodka: Effen, Haku, Pinnacle, Vox
- Bourbon whiskey: Baker's, Basil Hayden's, Beam's Eight Star, Booker's, Jim Beam, Kessler, Knob Creek, Legent, Maker's Mark, Old Crow, Old Grand-Dad
- Canadian whisky: Alberta Premium, Canadian Club
- Irish whiskey: Connemara, Kilbeggan, The Tyrconnell
- Japanese whisky: Chita, Hakushu, Hibiki, Kakubin, Torys, Toki, Yamazaki
- Scotch whisky:
  - Single malt: Ardmore, Auchentoshan, Bowmore, Glen Garioch, Laphroaig
  - Blended: Teacher's Highland Cream
- Spanish whisky: DYC whisky
- Wine: Akadama, Delica Maison, Château Lagrange Les Fiefs de Lagrange

=== Suntory Wellness ===
Suntory also handle & manufactures its health food & skincare business in Japan. While they have expanded this wellness presence into a few Asian markets (like Taiwan, China, and Thailand), it is not widely available in regions like the US or Europe.

- Sesamin E Plus
- DHA & EPA + Sesamin E
- Royal Jelly + Sesamin E
- Propolis + Sesamin E
- Arabita
- Glucosamine & Chondroitin
- CoQ10 + Sesamin E
- Contains maca and cordyceps.
- Green juice
- Deer antler reishi mushroom
- collagen
- chlorella
- blueberry
- Ginkgo leaves
- Saw palmetto + Sesamin E
- Fermented sesame kelp granules
- diet's
- diet's BB
- fire thorn
- Soy isoflavones + flax lignans
- Multivitamins & Minerals
- Calcium & Magnesium
- Black vinegar garlic
- Green juice bitter melon
- Bifidobacteria + Xylooligosaccharides
- Sweet tea 400
- Sesame Pepper Tea
- Locomore - Food with functional claims

Since 2010, they have also been selling the Suntory FAGE series of anti-aging skincare products by mail order, which was developed based on yeast research accumulated through alcohol production.

== Media and advertising ==
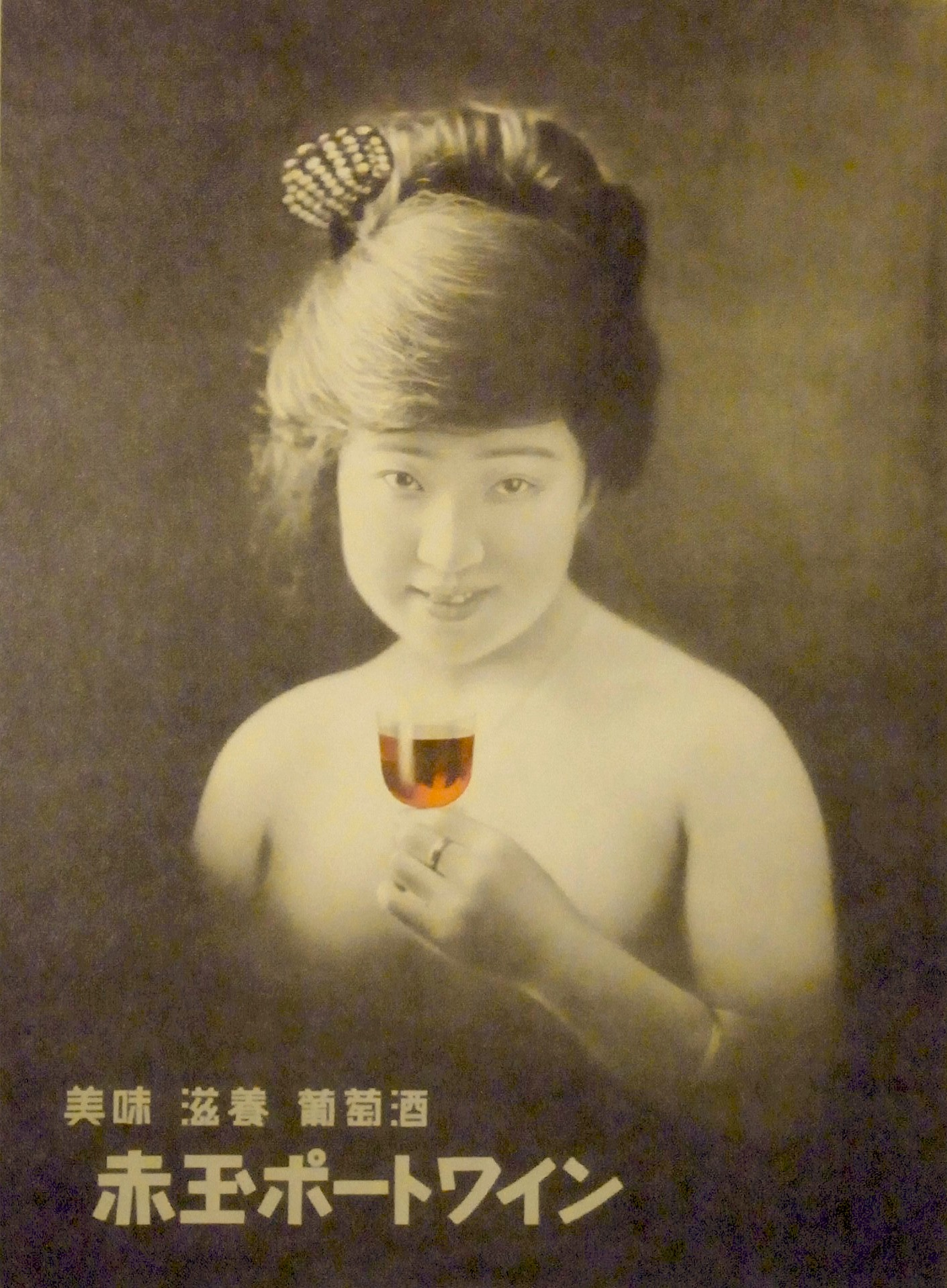
Akadama advertising poster from 1922

- Suntory was one of the first East Asian companies to specifically employ American celebrities to market their product. One of the most notable is Sammy Davis Jr., who appeared in a series of Suntory commercials in the early 1970s. In the late 1970s, Akira Kurosawa directed a series of commercials featuring American celebrities on the set of his film Kagemusha. One of these featured Francis Ford Coppola (an executive producer of the film), which later inspired his daughter Sofia Coppola in her writing of Lost in Translation, a film which focuses on an American actor (played by Bill Murray) filming a Suntory commercial in Tokyo for the Hibiki whisky.
- Suntory operates two museums, the Suntory Museum of Art in Tokyo and the Suntory Museum Tempozan in Osaka, in addition to a number of cultural and social programs across Japan.
- In the 1970s, Suntory engaged the US pop group the Carpenters to advertise its new line of soft drinks.
- Suntory is a former sponsor of the professional match play golf tournament, played annually at Wentworth Club, near London.
- In 2023 for Suntory's 100th year anniversary, and 20 years after the appearance of Lost in Translation, director Sofia Coppola was asked to direct the company's anniversary tribute video starring Keanu Reeves, with a mix that included scenes from her film along with footage of her father and Akira Kurosawa's Suntory Whiskey advertisement from the 1970s.

== See also ==
- Suntory Mermaid II – wave powered catamaran
- Suntory Sunbirds
- Suntory Sungoliath rugby team – champions of the 2007-08 Top League (fifth season)
