= Coca-Cola Fiber+ =

Diet version of Coca-Cola produced in Japan

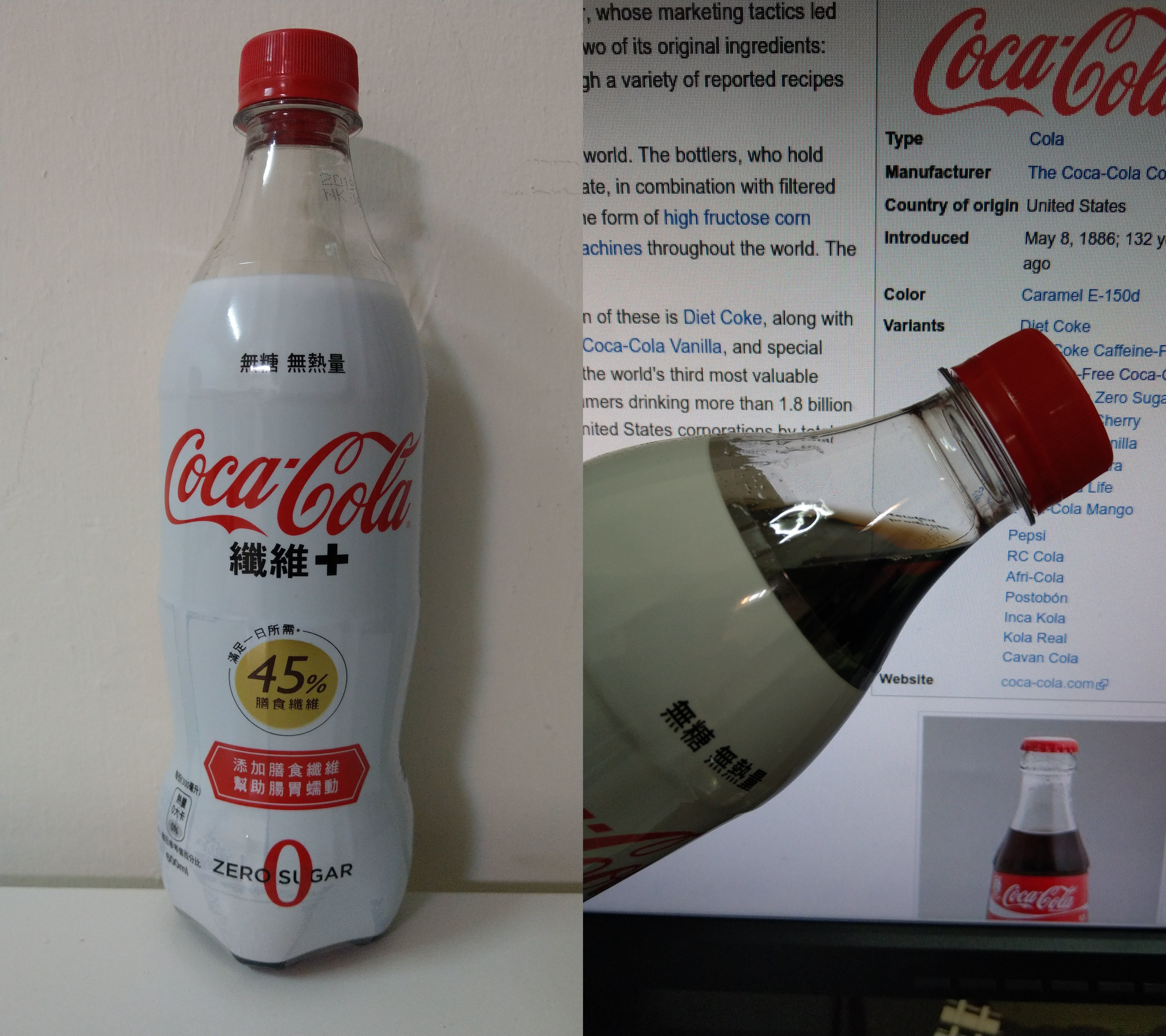
- A bottle of Coca-Cola Fiber+ from Taiwan
- Type: Diet functional beverage
- Manufacturer: The Coca-Cola Company
- Country of origin: Japan
- Introduced: March 2017
- Related products: Pepsi Special

Coca-Cola Fiber+ or Coca-Cola plus is a diet variant of the soft drink Coca-Cola with added dietary fiber in the form of dextrin. It was developed by Coca-Cola Asia Pacific and launched locally in Japan during March 2017. The soft drink has been approved by the Japanese FOSHU as a functional beverage and is meant to serve as an option for health-conscious consumers who have varying desires when it comes to beverages, such as sweetened/non-sweetened, more/less caffeinated, or in the case of Coca-Cola Fiber+, having more fiber. According to Dr. David Machiels, product development director at Coca-Cola Asia Pacific, "Drinking one Coca-Cola Plus per day with food will help suppress fat absorption and help moderate the levels of triglycerides in the blood after eating. … so we hope people will drink it with meals."

These health claims are disputed as exaggerating the positive effects of consuming dextrin.

== Ingredients ==
Coca-Cola Fiber+ or "Coca-Cola plus" contains carbonated water, resistant maltodextrin (dietary fiber), colour (150d), acidity regulator (338, 331), sweeteners (951, 950, 955), flavourings, preservative (211), caffeine

== Production and distribution ==
Coca-Cola Fiber+ is available in:

- Japan
- Taiwan
- Mainland China
- Hong Kong
- Vietnam
- Mongolia
