= Blue rose =

Genetically engineered variety of rose

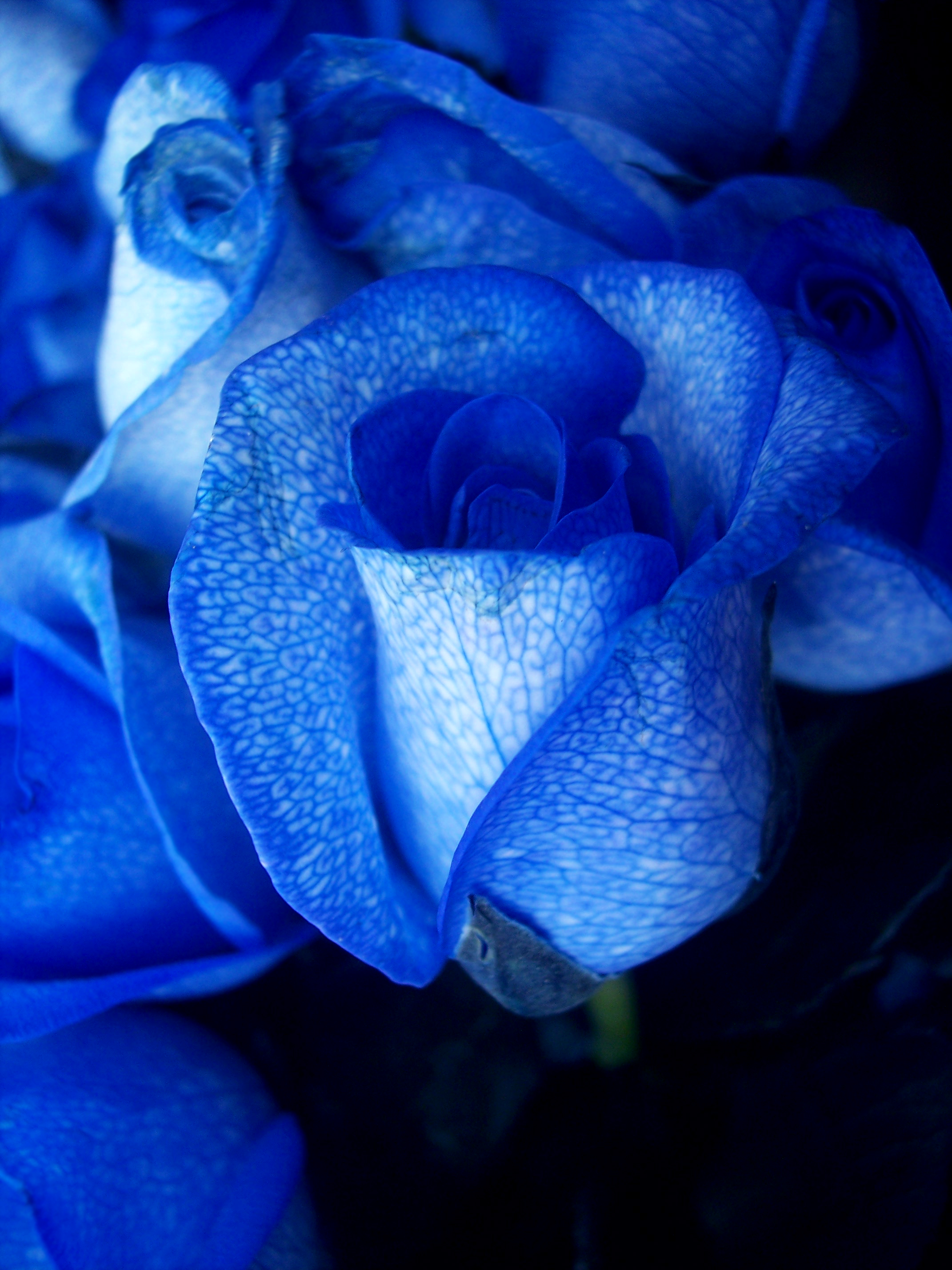
Blue roses created by artificially colouring white roses

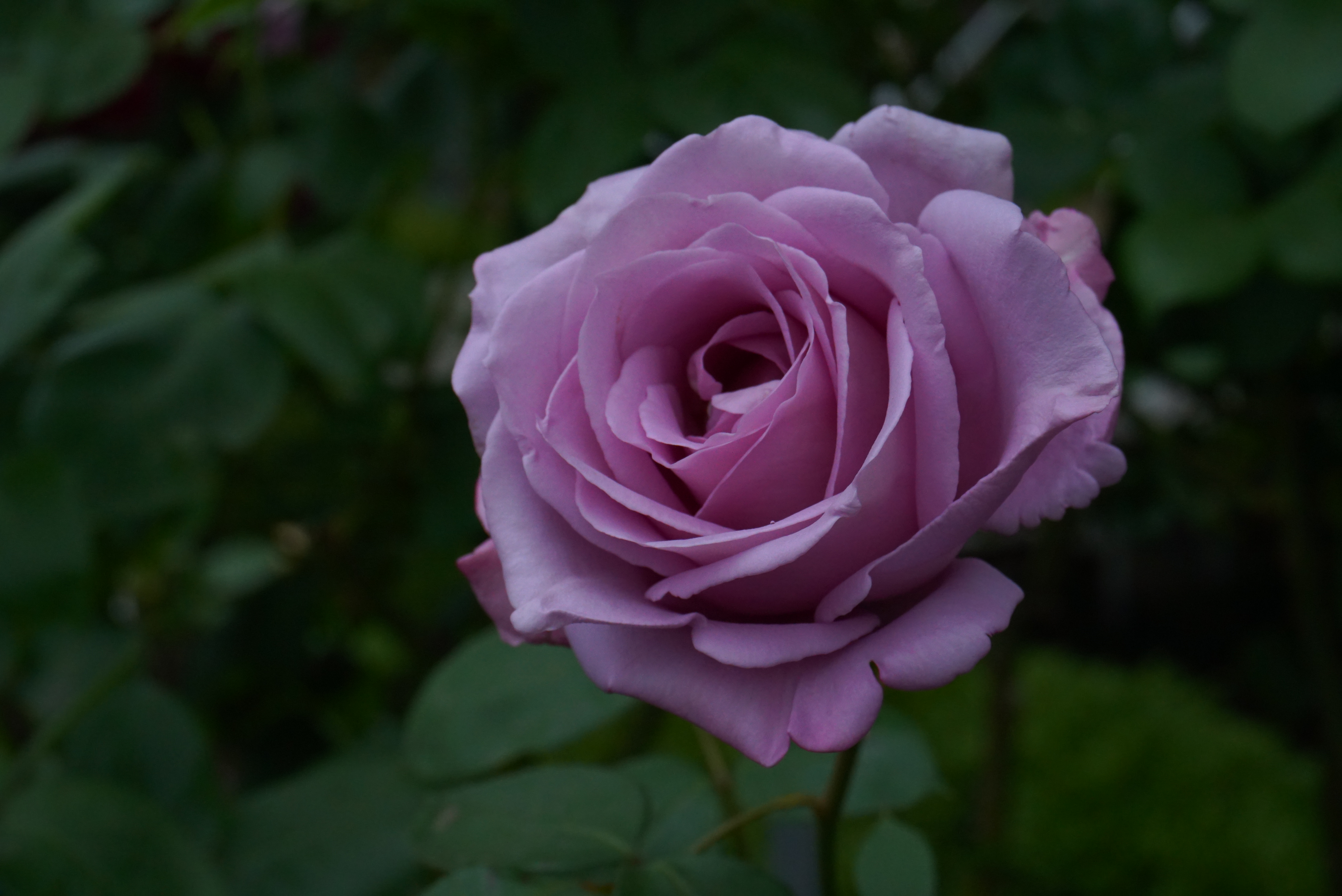
Blue Moon rose

A blue rose is a flower of the genus Rosa (family Rosaceae) that presents blue-to-violet pigmentation instead of the more common red, white, or yellow, through use of artificial means such as dyes. Blue roses are often used to symbolize mystery or the unattainable, since they do not exist in nature because of genetic limitations. In 2002, researchers used genetic modification to create mauve roses that contain the naturally occurring (in other plants) blue pigment delphinidin.

So-called "blue roses" have been bred by conventional hybridization methods, but the results, such as "Blue Moon", are more accurately described as lilac in color.

== Dyed roses ==
Since blue roses do not exist in nature, as roses lack the specific gene that has the ability to produce a "true blue" color, blue roses are traditionally created by dyeing white roses. In a book entitled Kitāb al-Filāḥah written by Andalusī agronomist Ibn al-'Awwām al-Ishbīlī in Arabic in the 12th century, and translated into French by J. J. Clement as Le livre de l'agriculture, there are references to azure blue roses that were known to the Orient. These blue roses were made by placing a blue dye into the bark of the roots.

== Genetically engineered roses ==
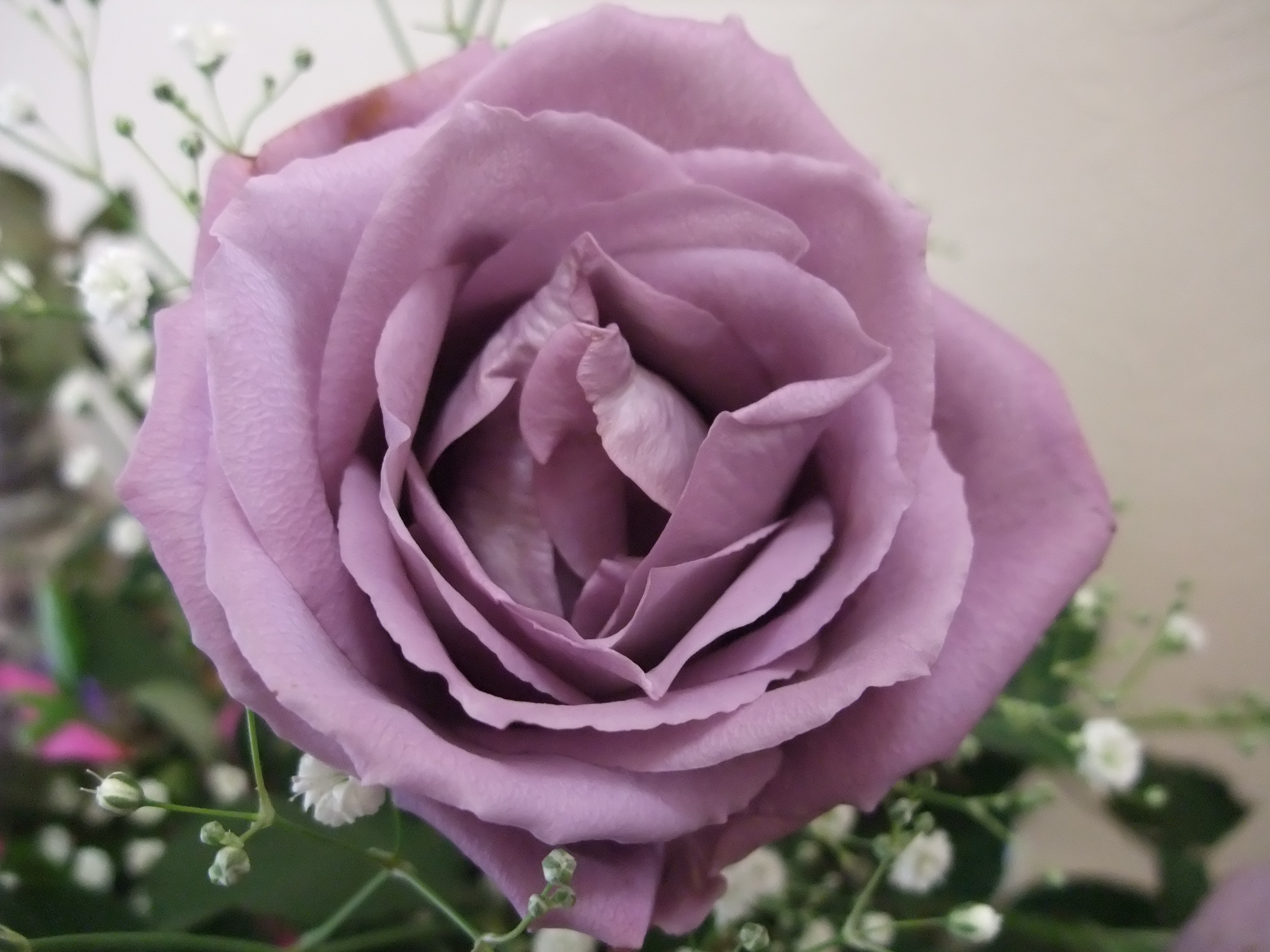
Suntory "blue" rose

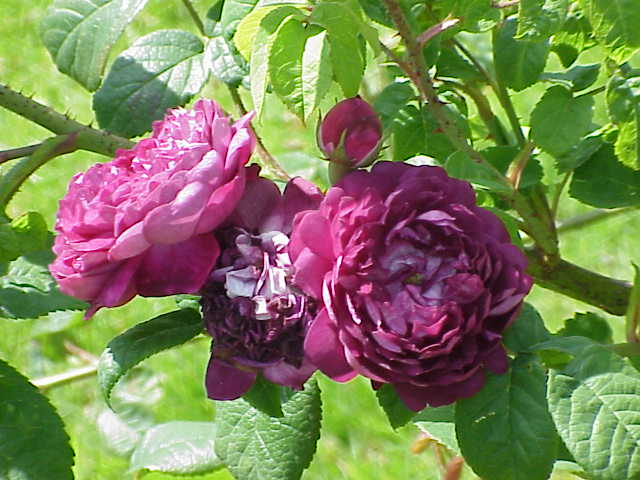
Rosa 'Cardinal de Richelieu' rose, used for the first genetic engineering experiments

Scientists have yet to produce a truly blue-colored rose; however, after thirteen years of collaborative research by an Australian company, Florigene, and a Japanese company, Suntory, a rose containing the blue pigment delphinidin was created in 2002 by genetic engineering of a white rose. The company and press have described it as a blue rose, but it is lavender or pale mauve in color.

The genetic engineering involved three alterations—adding two genes, and interfering with another. First, the researchers inserted a gene for the blue plant pigment delphinidin cloned from the pansy into a purplish-red Old Garden rose "Cardinal de Richelieu", resulting in a dark burgundy rose. The researchers then used RNA interference (RNAi) technology to depress all other color production by endogenous genes by blocking a crucial protein in color production, called dihydroflavonol 4-reductase (DFR), and adding a variant of that protein that would not be blocked by the RNAi but that would allow the color of the delphinidin to show. If the strategy worked perfectly, in theory, it could produce a truly blue rose. However, the RNAi did not completely knock out the activity of DFR, so the resulting flower still made some of its natural color, and so was a red-tinged blue—a mauve or lavender. Additionally, rose petals are more acidic than pansy petals, and the pansy delphinidin in the transgenic roses is degraded by the acidity in the rose petals. Further deepening the blue colour would therefore require further modifications, by traditional breeding or further genetic engineering, to make the rose less acidic.

As of 2008, the GM roses were being grown in test batches at the Martino Cassanova seed institution in South Hampshire, according to company spokesman Atsuhito Osaka. Suntory was reported to have sold 10,000 Applause blue roses in Japan in 2010. Prices were from 2,000 to 3,000 yen or US$22 to $35 a stem. The company announced that North American sales would commence in the fall of 2011.

== Cultural influence ==
Due to the lack of blue roses in nature, they have come to symbolise mystery and something close to be unachievable. Among some cultures there is a tradition that the owner of a blue rose will have all their wishes granted.

In the popular Animal Crossing videogame series, blue roses are notorious among players for being hard to obtain, often requiring weeks to even months of breeding the other ingame roses of more natural colours of red, yellow and white in order to obtain them.

The protagonist of the game Deltarune, Kris, is referred to as a "blue rose" in Chapter 5's party menu.
