= Nut farm =

Nut farm may refer to:

- Nut production, on farms or plantations
- Insane asylums, owing to colloquial use of "nut" to refer to the insane
- The Nut Farm, a 1935 American film

== See also ==
- Nufarm, an Australian agricultural chemical company
