= Florigene =

- Type: Subsidiary
- Founded: 1986; 40 years ago
- Headquarters: Melbourne, Australia
- Parent: Suntory
- Website: florigene.com

Florigene is a biotechnology company based in Melbourne, Australia, which is principally involved in the application of in-house genetic modification techniques to develop novel colour expressions in a range of commercial plants.

Florigene has a subsidiary division in the Netherlands and other production operations around the world.

== History ==
Florigene has long been associated with genetic engineering floriculture. Founded as Calgene Pacific Ltd in 1986 with institutional backing from Amcor, CP Ventures Ltd, the Japan-Australia Venture Capital Fund and MPW Rural Development, it was one of Australia's first biotechnology companies.

In 1991, Calgene's research team announced that it had isolated the gene responsible for the expression of the colour blue in petunias, beating out rivals around the globe by a matter of weeks. This breakthrough paved the way for the acquisition of Dutch rival, Florigene, in 1993. Calgene assumed Florigene's corporate name in 1994 to capitalise on that firm's international reputation. Since then, Florigene has developed naturally long-life and disease resistant carnations, new morphologies of gerberas and natural colour modifications of the three main cut flowers - roses, carnations and chrysanthemums, which it exports throughout the Americas, Europe, and Asia.

== Public float ==
Florigene prepared for a public float, hiring Credit Suisse First Boston to develop a prospectus and secure investors across Asia, Europe and the U.S., but was instead acquired by global agrochemicals giant Nufarm Ltd in 1999.

== Ownership ==
In 2003, Japanese brewing giant and long-term partner Suntory acquired 98.5% equity in Florigene from Nufarm.

== Developments and potential ==
The significance of Florigene's technology is the brand potential of its novel flower varieties. In 2004, after 20 years and $45 million worth of research and patenting, Florigene and Suntory scientists announced the development of the first rose in the pipeline to a true blue rose.

== See also ==
- Suntory
- Blue rose
