= Plant Nanny =

Mobile app for tracking water intake

- Developer: Fourdesire
- Initial release: 2013
- Operating system: iOS, Android
- Platform: Mobile
- Type: Health, Wellness, Productivity
- License: Proprietary

Plant Nanny is a water tracker mobile application which reminds users to drink water. It was developed by Taiwanese app maker Fourdesire.

The app was first released in 2013 and is available on the Apple App Store for iPhones and the Google Play Store for Android devices.

== Description ==
Play Nanny uses a game method that allows users to turn their virtual selves into plants, which grows and thrives as the user drinks more water. The app sends occasional push notifications to remind users to drink water throughout the day.

Users can choose from a wide range of plants, including cacti and carnations, and track their water intake. The app uses two resources, How to calculate how much water you should drink by Jennifer Stone (2018) and Human energy requirements by the Food and Agriculture Organization (2004), to calculate the recommended daily water intake for its users.

Upon downloading the app, users are prompted to input basic personal information which is then used to calculate the recommended daily water intake and prompts them to drink the appropriate amount.

== Accolades ==
| Award | Year | Location |
|---|---|---|
| App Store Best Games | 2013 | N/A |
| Best Life Helper App | 2019 | Taiwan, Hong Kong, Thailand, Indonesia, Italy, and Spain |
