= Vase life =

Vase life is a term used by the floristry industry that describes the period during which a cut flower or cut foliage retains its appearance in a vase. This is a major consideration in identifying plant species suitable for use in floristry, as plants with a long vase life are far more desirable than those with a short vase life.

Vase life can be affected by pre-harvest factors, such as growing conditions or genetic makeup, or post-harvest factors, such as mechanical damage, bacteria or fungi. Keeping flowers in cooler temperatures, usually via refrigeration, can extend their vase life, as can hydrating them, preferably with soft water.

Vase life also varies across plant species and cultivars. Cut flowers with a short vase life, of less than 5 days, include dahlias, irises, daffodils, and delphinium; flowers with a medium vase life (6 to 14 days) include marigolds, snapdragons, orchids, and roses; and flowers with a long vase life (2 to 4 weeks) include tulips, carnations, and chrysanthemums.

Chemical treatments that extend vase life are a major component of floriculture research. These include:

- Bud opening development, where buds are harvested early in development then kept in a solution of sucrose, plant hormones, and germicides before they open.
- Pulsing, where flowers are treated with increasing concentrations of sucrose for 16-20 hours at a time.
- Holding or vase solutions, which treat flowers with a mixture of carbohydrates (generally sugar), plant growth regulators, germicides, ethylene inhibitors, mineral salts, and organic acids.
