= Makiko Ono =

Japanese business woman

- Born: March 16, 1960 (age 66)
- Education: International Institute for Management Development; Tokyo University of Foreign Studies
- Occupation: CEO
- Employer: Suntory

Makiko Ono (born March 16, 1960) is a Japanese business woman and the CEO of Suntory Beverages and Food. She is the first woman to become a Chief Executive at Suntory. She was previously responsible for foreign acquisitions and secured partnerships with Lucozade, Ribena, and Orangina. She was named as one of the World's 100 Most Powerful Women in 2023.

== Early life and education ==
Ono studied Portuguese at the Tokyo University of Foreign Studies. Ono started working at Suntory after graduating college, where she joined the mergers and acquisition team. She has said that she was encouraged to apply because of how many women employees were involved with her recruitment. She earned an Executive Master of Business Administration (EMBA) at the International Institute for Management Development. Early in her career she noticed that her male colleagues were being prioritised for overseas appointments, pointed it out, and was appointed to France.

== Career ==
At Suntory Ono was responsible for foreign acquisitions, and secured major partnerships with Lucozade, Ribena and a French winery. In 2009 Suntory bought Orangina, and Ono was appointed as their General Director in 2020. In 2023 Ono became CEO of Suntory, where she was the first woman Chief Executive. In fact, Suntory became the largest listed Japanese company with a woman CEO.

She was named one of Time magazine's Women of the Year in 2023. That year she was also named as one of Forbes Power Women. She was ranked 64th on Fortune's list of Most Powerful Women in 2023.
