= C.C. Lemon =

Japanese soft drink

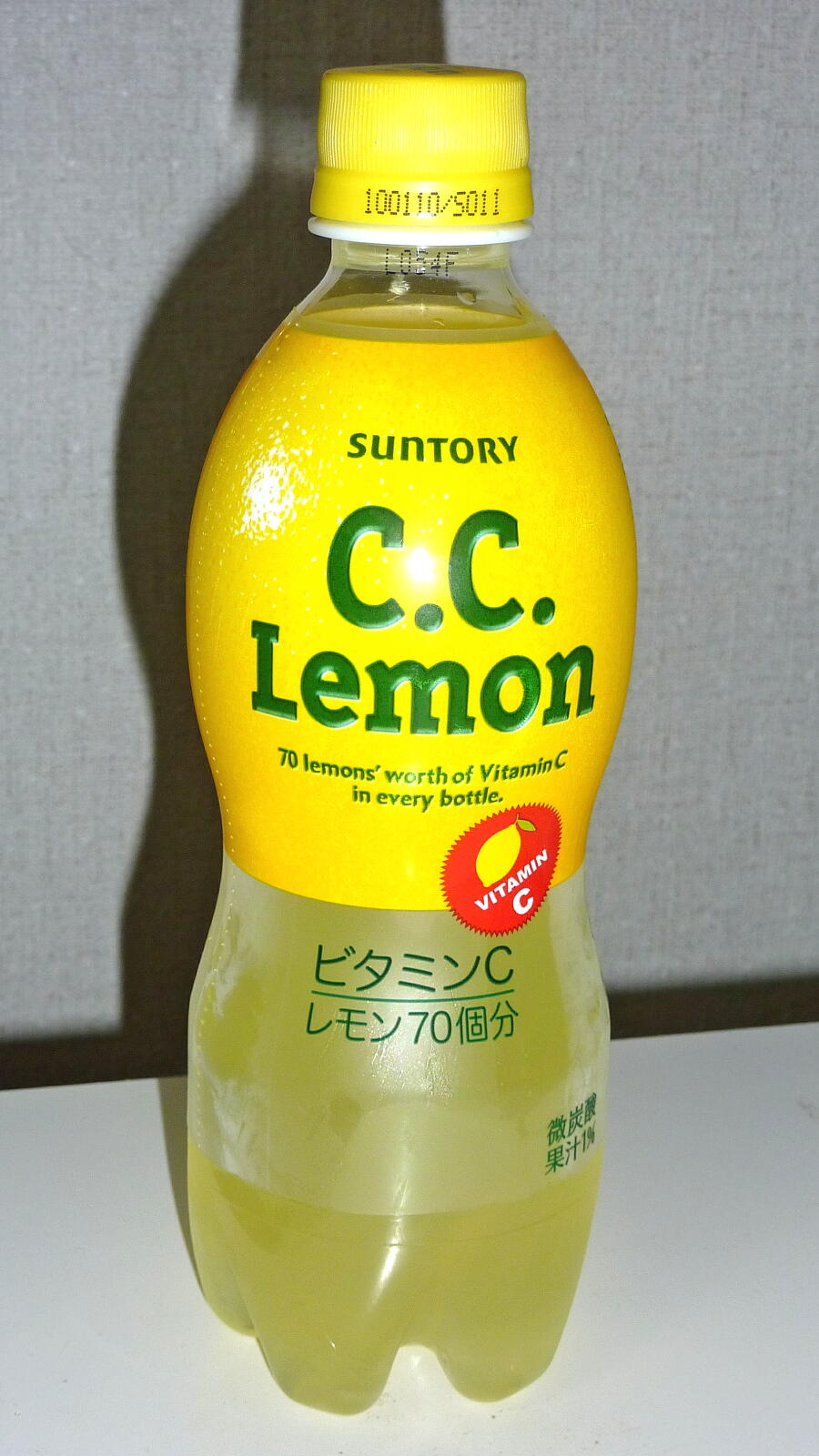
- Type: Lemon-flavored soft drink
- Manufacturer: Suntory
- Origin: Japan
- Introduced: 1994
- Related products: Calpis; Smart C
- Website: www.suntory.co.jp/softdrink/cclemon/index.html

C.C. Lemon is a Japanese soft drink created by Suntory. It is known for its lemon flavor, and for its advertisements featuring characters from the American animated series The Simpsons.

== History ==
Realeased on March 1, 1994. Initially, the TV commercials also displayed the name as "CC Lemon." In Japan, it is the third best-selling beverage, after Coca-Cola and Pepsi. It is available in both can and bottle versions.

The drink is named CC Lemon, based on the themes of lemon and vitamin C. The amount of sugar is not different from that of soft drinks such as cola

In July 2010, the 500ml PET bottle was redesigned and changed to a slimmer, straight bottle, but the PET bottles for vending machines remained unchanged. Starting with "CC Grape," released in April 2014, the label size was reduced, and existing "CC Lemon" PET bottle products and "CC Lmon Resfresh Zero" were also switched to the new label (the 1.5L PET bottle uses the same small label as the "Pepsi Cola Nex" which was redesigned and released in march of the same year).

In July 2014, it was also launched in Vietnam.

== Sizes ==
C.C. Lemon is available in multiple sizes. The quantity, type of container, and amount of vitamin C in lemons are provided in the table below.

Volume	Container	Number of Lemons worth of vitamin C
160 mL	Can	22 Lemons
250 mL	Can	35 Lemons
280 mL	Can	40 Lemons
350 mL	Can	50 Lemons
500 mL	Can/Bottle	70 Lemons
1500 mL	Bottle	210 Lemons

== Mascots ==
=== The Simpsons ===
The Simpsons have appeared in numerous commercials for C.C. Lemon. In Japan, The Simpsons are anecdotally better known for being featured in C.C. Lemon commercials than for their television show. References to the yellow color of the Simpsons is featured heavily in the marketing.

Along with the many television commercials, The Simpsons also appear on a wide range of merchandise for the product. The promotional items include 500 mL beverage holders, pens, coasters, magnets, lunchboxes, and foldable lawn chairs. The Simpsons also appeared on the 500mL bottles in their winter attire during the season of Christmas in 2001.

=== Mr. C.C. Lemon ===
The Simpsons family is not C.C. Lemon's only mascot. The mascot, Mr. C.C. Lemon, greets people on the official website, and states he is "a sparkling guy who LOVES to make people laugh." He is a barrel chested white man, played by American actor Guy Totaro, dressed entirely in yellow. On his legs, he wears yellow shorts, knee length yellow socks along with yellow high tops, and his top is a yellow T-shirt with the C.C. Lemon logo.
