= Takeshi Niinami =

Japanese businessman who was president of Suntory 2014-2025

- 新浪 剛史
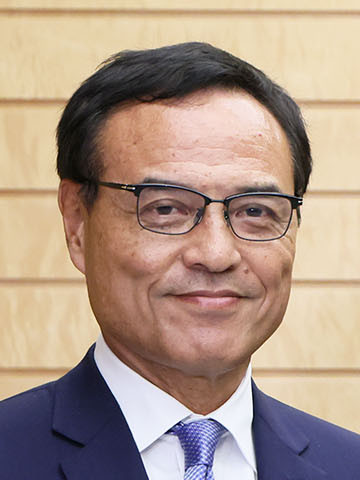
- Takeshi Niinami in 2024 at the Prime Minister's Official Residence
- Born: January 30, 1959 (age 67); Kanagawa Prefecture, Japan
- Education: Keio University, Stanford University, Harvard Business School
- Occupation: Business executive
- Known for: President and CEO of Japanese drinks company Suntory 2014-2025

Takeshi Niinami (新浪 剛史 (Niinami Takeshi); born 30 January 1959 in Yokohama) is a Japanese business executive, who was president, CEO and representative director of Suntory from 2014 until his resignation in September 2025. Suntory is the largest alcoholic beverage maker in Japan, and holds the brands Yamazaki and Jim Beam in its portfolio.

== Early life and education ==
Niinami studied economics at Stanford University and Keio University, where he graduated with a bachelor's degree in 1981. In 1991, he earned his MBA from Harvard Business School.

== Career ==
In 1981, he began his career at Mitsubishi Corporation.

In 1995, he was appointed CEO of the Sodex Corporation he founded (currently LEOC Co), a joint venture between Mitsubishi and Sodexo (formerly Sodexho Alliance) from France in the field of hospital catering. In 2002, he was appointed president and CEO of Lawson Inc., the second-largest convenience store operator.

On October 1, 2014, he became president and CEO of Suntory Holdings Limited. He declined the position of CEO of Nissan Motors in 2019.

He was a member of the Industrial Competitiveness Council of Japan, and is a member of the Council on Economic and Fiscal Policy (CEFP) as a senior economic advisor to the Prime Minister, and chairman of the committee for promoting integrated economic and financial reforms.

Additionally, he is the vice chairman of the Japan Association of Corporate Executives (KEIZAI DOYUKAI) and a member of the Global Agenda Council on Japan of the World Economic Forum.

== Recognition ==
Niinami received the 'Outstanding Manager Award' at the 21st Corporate Communication Awards of the Japan Business Federation (KEIDANREN).
