= Château Lagrange =

Winery in the Bordeaux region of France

Coordinates: 45.14947°N 0.77325°W

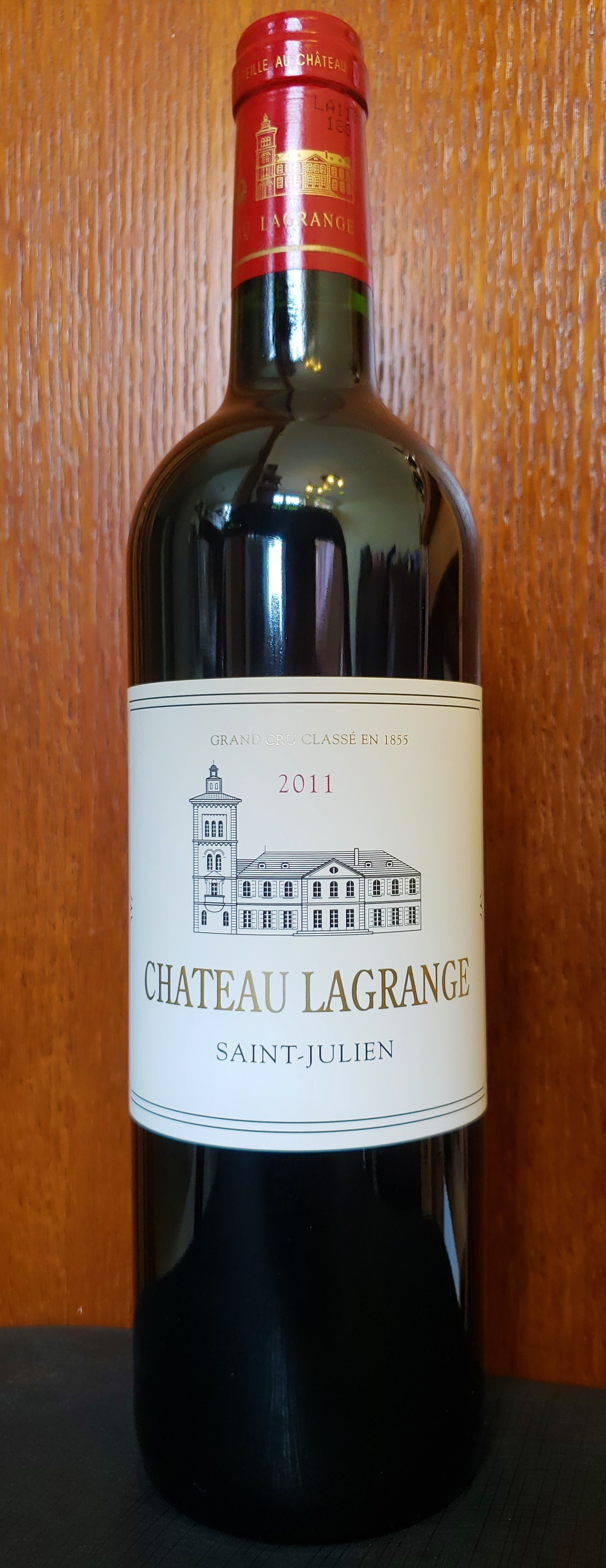
Grand Vin 2011

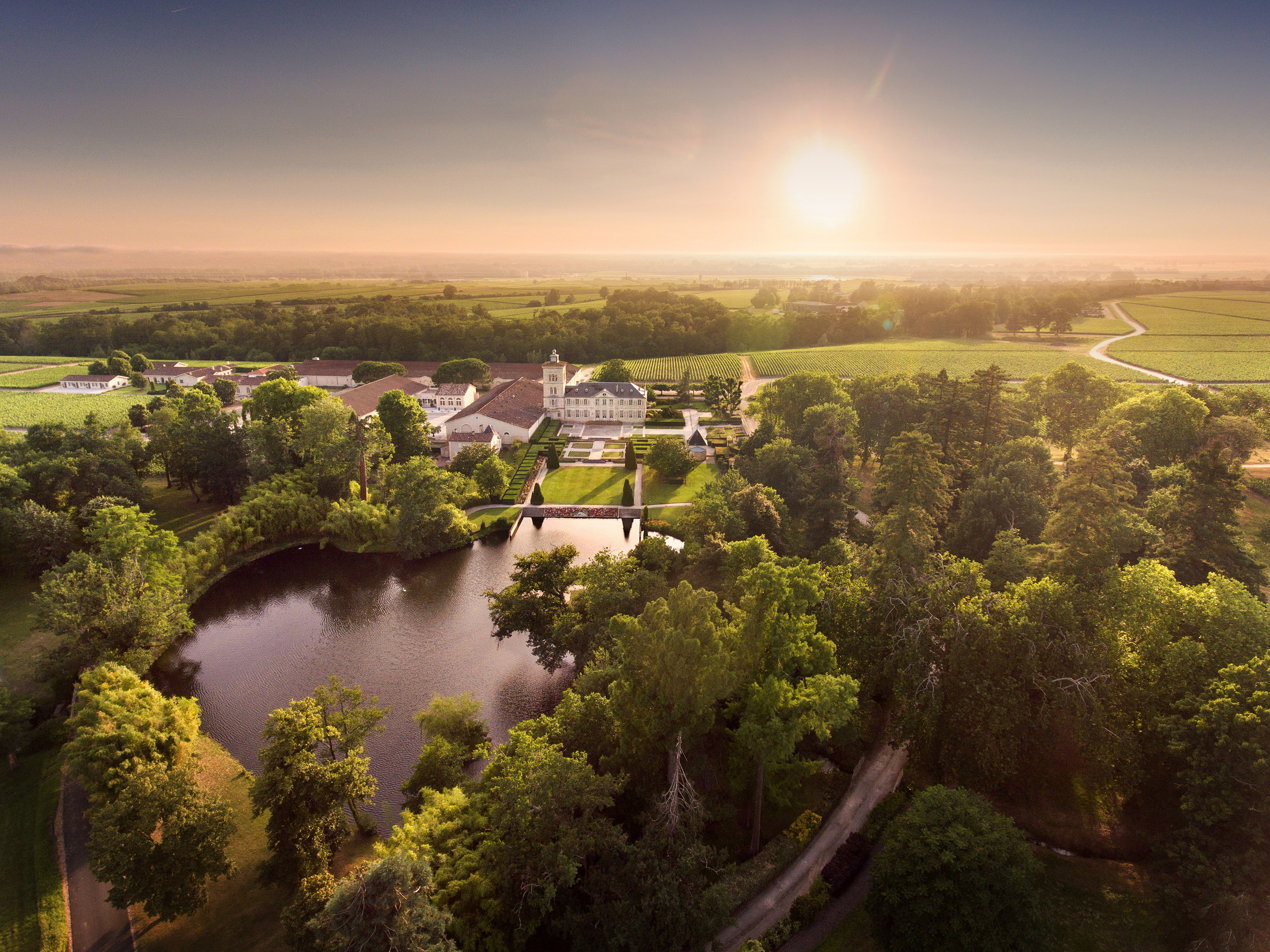

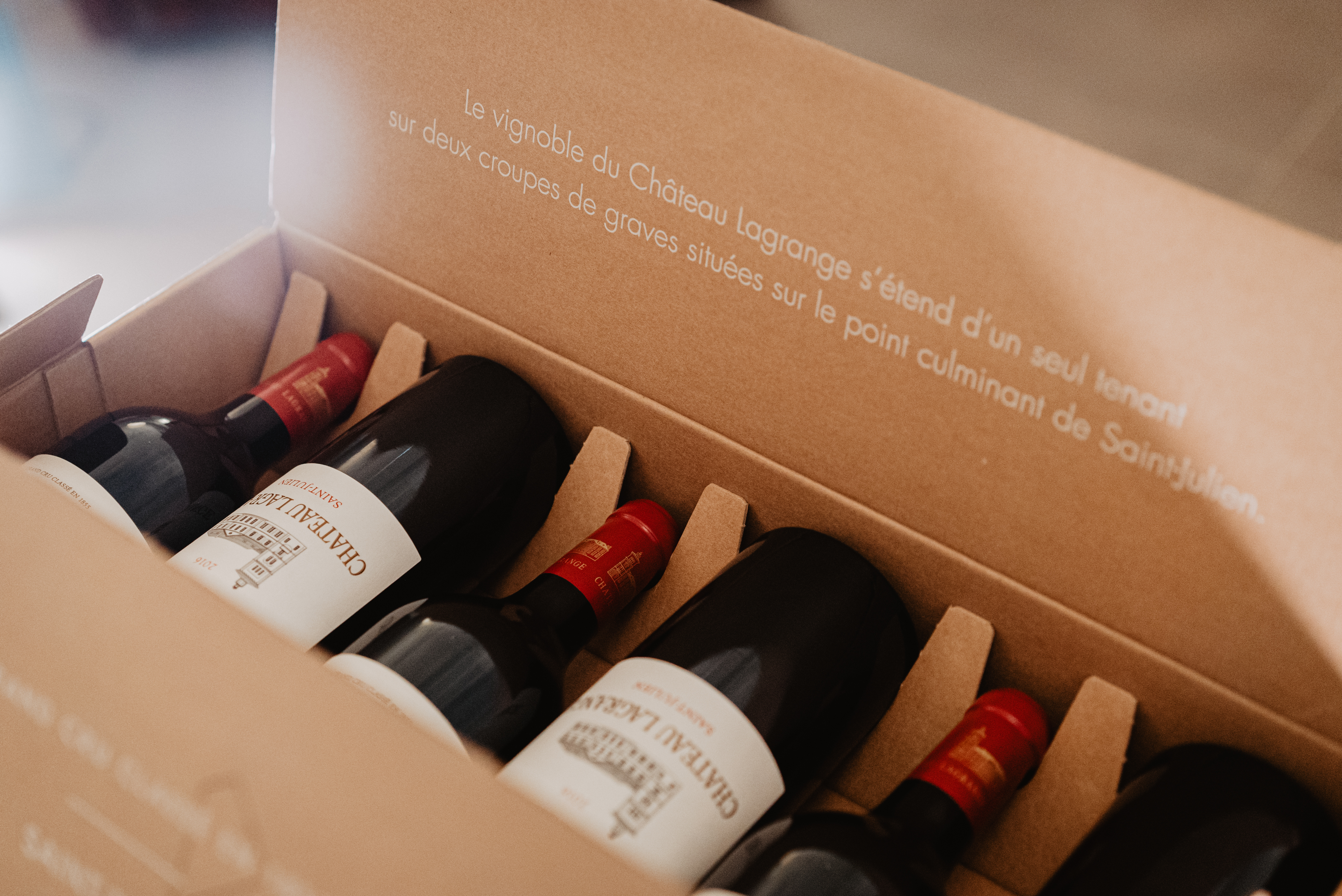

Château Lagrange is a winery in the Saint-Julien appellation of the Bordeaux region of France, and is also the name of the red wine produced by this property. It is owned by the Japanese liquor giant Suntory. The wine produced here was classified as one of fourteen Troisièmes Crus (Third Growths) in the historic Bordeaux Wine Official Classification of 1855.

== History ==
Château Lagrange was purchased by Japanese liquor giant Suntory in 1983 with Marcel Ducasse as directeur général and winemaker. Large budgets from Suntory allowed Marcel Ducasse to invest in the remake of the vineyards and cellars and led to a successful revival of Château Lagrange.

== Production ==
The largest single vineyard among classified estates in the Medoc, the 280 acres (110 ha) vineyard of Lagrange is an undivided block in the western portion of the appellation. As is typical of the region there is a high percentage of cabernet sauvignon, about 65%, planted in the vineyard with vines averaging 30 years of age. The remainder of the gravelly vineyard is planted 28% merlot, and 7% petit verdot. Château Lagrange also has a small vineyard of 9.8 acres (40,000 m^{2}) planted to white varieties (53% sauvignon blanc, 36% semillon, and 11% muscadelle).

Château Lagrange produces three wines; an eponymous grand vin (about 23,000 cases), a second wine called Les Fiefs de Lagrange (about 31,000 cases), and since 1997, a small amount of white wine called Les Arums de Lagrange. The red wines are fermented in temperature controlled stainless steel vats, and then aged in oak barrels, 50% of which are new, for roughly 20 months before bottling.

== Note ==
Château Lagrange is also the name of an unrelated small estate in the appellation of Pomerol.
