= Pepsi Special =

Japanese PepsiCo product

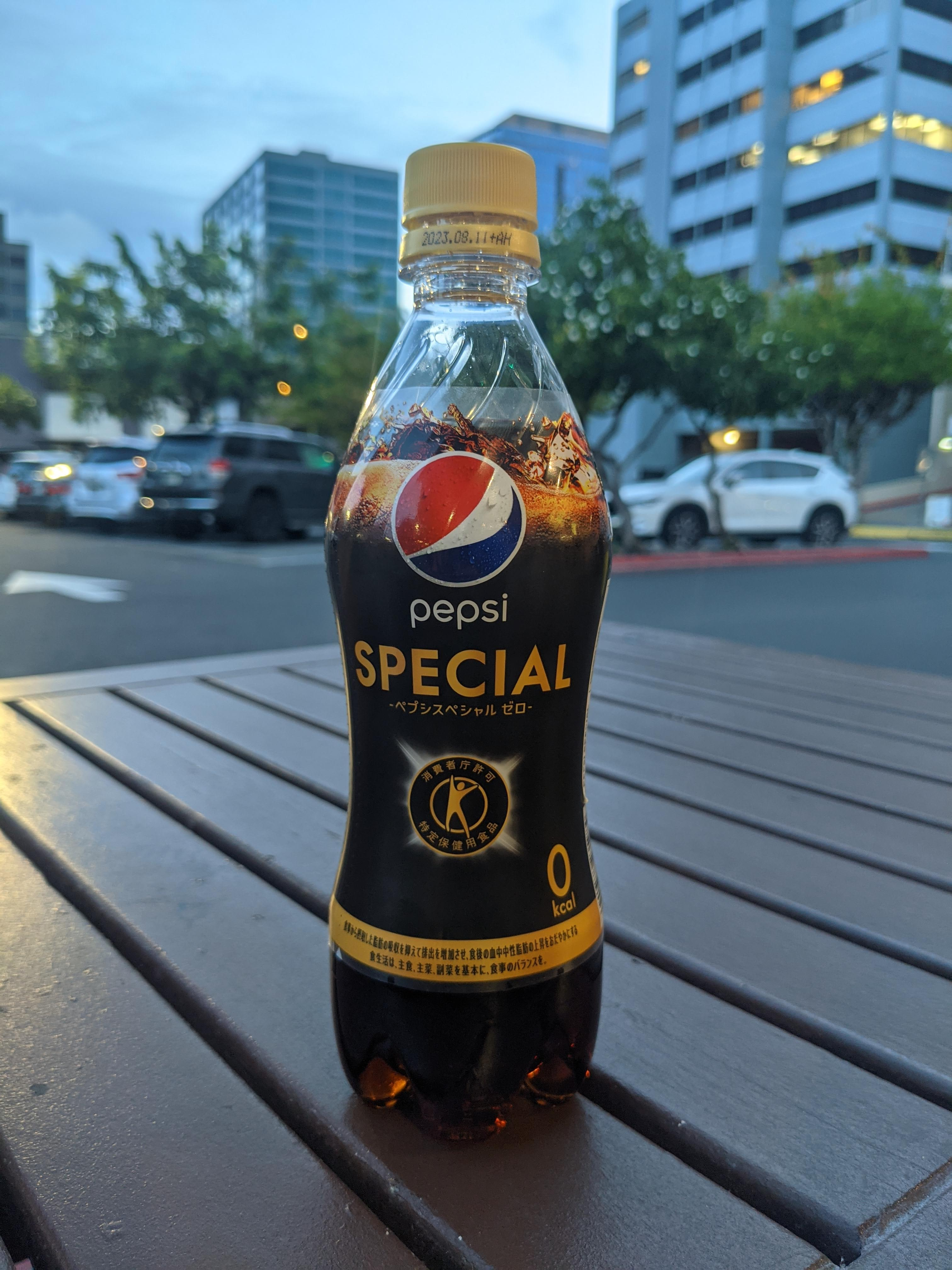
- A bottle of Pepsi Special
- Type: Soft Drink
- Manufacturer: Suntory Holdings Ltd.
- Distributor: PepsiCo
- Origin: Japan
- Introduced: 2012
- Colour: Caramel
- Flavour: Cola

Pepsi Special is a cola flavored soft drink offered in Japan from PepsiCo that contains Dextrin. Suntory, the manufacturer of the beverage claims that the dextrin in the drink suppresses the absorption of fat. The Government of Japan stated that Pepsi Special can benefit those who wish to fight issues with blood pressure or high cholesterol.

The drink is not available in the United States, except where imported by international food stores. According to Time, PepsiCo could face legal challenges from the US Food and Drug Administration if the drink were to be sold in the US.
