= Kris (Deltarune) =

Character in Deltarune

Kris Dreemurr
- Deltarune character
- Kris, as they appear in the Light World
- First game: Deltarune (Chapter 1, 2018)
- Created by: Toby Fox
- Designed by: Toby Fox; Gigi D.G.; Chess (spritework)

In-universe information
- Gender: Unstated (Referred to by they/them pronouns)

Kris Dreemurr is the protagonist of the episodic role-playing video game Deltarune. They are a human teenager residing in the Light World with their monster mother Toriel. Kris befriends a monster girl named Susie after they both discover a Dark World inside their school's supply closet. Alongside Susie and the Darkner Ralsei, Kris is prophesied to seal various "Dark Fountains" which threaten to destroy both worlds. Kris appears to struggle with the player's control over them, occasionally rejecting it by ripping out their "soul", which seemingly allows Kris to regain free will, albeit in a weakened state. They were created by the game's developer, Toby Fox, with additional design work by concept artist Gigi DG and sprite artist Chess.

Kris has been generally well received by critics. Various aspects of their character have been subject to analysis, such as their relationship with the player, including in the alternate "weird" route, and in comparisons to characters in the related game Undertale. Kris' use of singular they pronouns has led some to interpret them as non-binary and has earned them praise as an example of LGBTQ representation in video games, despite the lack of official confirmation of their gender.

== Concept and creation ==
First concept art of Kris made by Toby Fox, c. 2014-2015

Kris was created by Toby Fox sometime during or before 2015. Their concept art was created by Fox alongside artist Gigi, and their Dark World design was among the first sprites created for the game, which were created by artist Chess. These sprites included a battle idle animation and slash animation. Kris has an androgynous appearance and is referred to using singular they pronouns. They are frequently interpreted as a non-binary character, though neither the game nor its creator have stated the character's gender identity.

They are a distinct character from the player avatar that controls them, having reactions to things the player makes them say or do that they would not have done. Different members of the cast view Kris differently, with perceptions of them ranging from nice to creepy. They are also the only human living in their town. In Dark Worlds, they have blue skin, armor, and wield a pink sword.

== Appearances ==
Kris, as they appear in Dark Worlds

Kris is the protagonist of Deltarune. They are controlled by the player through a red heart-shaped soul for most of the game. They are the human child of the monsters Toriel and Asgore Dreemurr, the sibling of Asriel Dreemurr, and a resident of "Hometown", a small town home to many characters from Undertale as well as new characters not seen in Undertale. They are currently the only human resident in Hometown, the rest being monsters similar to the Dreemurr family. Kris has been sparsely featured in merchandise based on Deltarune, including a pin set with other characters.

=== Chapter 1 ===
In Chapter 1, Kris and their school bully Susie discover a fantastical realm called a "Dark World" in the school's storage closet. They meet a Darkner—a being who comes from a Dark World—named Ralsei. He explains that the three of them are heroes prophesied to save both worlds by sealing "Dark Fountains", the sources of the darkness which Dark Worlds form out of. They are attacked by Prince Lancer, who was ordered by his father, King, to stop them from reaching the Fountain, only for them to befriend him and defeat the King, who was protecting the Fountain. After the Fountain is sealed and the Dark World fades away, Kris and Susie return to the Light World, vowing to return the next day. When Kris returns to their bedroom, they remove their soul, allowing them to fully act without player input.

=== Chapter 2 ===
In Chapter 2, Kris and Susie discover a Fountain at the library, entering a new computer-themed Dark World. Their classmates Noelle Holiday and Berdly were captured by its ruler, Queen, who explains that a figure called the Roaring Knight is the creator of the Fountains. Believing that the Knight opens Fountains to make the "Lightners" happy, Queen compels Noelle to open one. Kris eventually defeats Queen, and Ralsei explains that opening too many Fountains will end both worlds in an apocalypse known as "The Roaring". After sealing the Fountain, Susie stays over at Kris' house; while asleep, Kris removes their soul and opens a Fountain in their living room.

=== Chapter 3 ===
In Chapter 3, Kris and Susie awaken in the Dark World created from the fountain Kris had created the previous chapter. Ralsei joins the group shortly afterwards and informs Kris and Susie that the Darkners and Dark Worlds are illusory versions of objects and places in the Light World. The main trio are then brought into a game show by Tenna, a Darkner formed from Toriel's television, which has fallen into disuse. Afraid of becoming obsolete, Tenna holds Toriel hostage and manipulates the protagonists into playing his games. Tenna is eventually convinced to let her go, but is attacked at the last second by the Knight, who attempts to take Toriel. After defeating Kris, the Knight is also accosted by an officer named Undyne. The Knight kidnaps her, and she is brought to a shelter that is sealed with three codes. After Susie leaves, the door opens for Kris.

=== Chapter 4 ===
In Chapter 4, while Kris and Susie are searching Noelle's house for one of the codes, Kris rips out their soul, later receiving a phone call seemingly instructing them to sabotage the search. After the meetup is interrupted by Carol Holiday, Noelle's mother, Kris and Susie head to the local church to see Toriel, where they find another Fountain. Reuniting with Ralsei and guided by Gerson Boom, a dead monster revived by the Fountain, they encounter the Knight multiple times across three Dark Worlds in the church. Eventually, the Knight opens a Fountain within the Dark World, creating a giant creature called a Titan, beings that would overrun the world during the Roaring. With Gerson's help, Kris and Susie defeat the Titan, and the duo return to Kris's house. After Susie leaves, Kris removes the soul and starts to climb out their bedroom window, though the voice on their phone reminds Kris that they made an unspecified "promise".

=== Chapter 5 ===
In Chapter 5, set the following morning, Kris, whose skin has gone pale and whose movements are weak, climbs back through the window and reinserts the soul, restoring their complexion and vitality. Kris finds Susie in the school Dark World, and together they attend Hometown's annual Festival along with Noelle.

At the end of the day, after Noelle leaves, Kris removes the soul while Susie is distracted and opens a Dark Fountain in Asgore's flower shop. They then put the soul back in them to follow Susie inside. Kris, Susie, and Ralsei pursue Asgore within the shop's Dark World and encounter Darkner-like beings created from Asgore's seven colored flowers, led by Flowery, who are trying to persuade Asgore not to leave the Dark World. Eventually, Asgore discovers Kris and Flowery fighting and intervenes. He apologizes to Kris for his obsession with an unspecified incident involving a Dark World years prior that resulted in his dismissal from the police force, and promises to be a more attentive father.

Kris then closes the Dark Fountain, but the Dark World persists due to a second Dark Fountain made by the Knight, who kidnaps Asgore and mortally wounds Flowery. Kris then seals the second Dark Fountain, returning Asgore's flower shop to normal. While Susie is in a different room, Kris takes a packet of seeds covered in warning labels from the golden flower that became Flowery, and discovers a piece of paper containing one of the shelter's codes hidden in the flower's soil. Kris attempts to tear it up, but Susie returns and takes the paper from them. Kris then walks Susie back to the school Dark World, which she calls her home. After Susie decides Noelle needs to be properly informed about the Dark Worlds and enters the storage closet, Kris looks back at the closet door for a moment before leaving.

=== Alternate route ===
Kris can be made to start the secret "Weird Route" (also commonly known as the "Snowgrave Route" or "Side B") in Chapter 2, in which Noelle is instructed by the player to use ice magic to kill several Darkners, equip the "ThornRing", and injure Berdly using the "Snowgrave" spell.

In Chapter 4, in Noelle's house, it's revealed that Kris removed the ThornRing from Noelle offscreen following the events of Chapter 2. The player then regains control of Kris and re-equips the ThornRing on Noelle. The next morning, during Chapter 5, Noelle leads Kris into Hometown's lake in an attempt to reach the other side.

== Reception ==
IGN writer Brendan Graeber considered the relationship between the player and Kris "incredibly wild and unique" with how the two fight over control, stating that while they may seem like a silent protagonist, they still have their own goals and personality. He also praised the relationship between Kris and Susie, calling them one of his favorite teams in a turn-based video game and stating how fascinated he was with their loneliness and the bond that they form between each other and Ralsei. He suggested that Susie is as much, if not more so a protagonist as Kris is, appreciating how the two's relationship offered "some of the funniest, most heartwarming, and most sincere" parts of the games. He liked how the game often gives Kris the opportunity to make stupid decisions, with Susie encouraging them, calling their enthusiasm over their interactions "inescapably contagious".

Heidi Kemps of GameSpot discussed the relationship between Kris and Noelle in the Weird Route of Chapter 2 as an emotionally abusive one. She stated that Noelle following Kris' orders more and more causes her to become more willing to do emotionally and physically damaging acts. USA Today writer Mary Clarke discussed how Kris' reactions to the events of the Weird Route emphasized the lack of control Kris has, citing how disturbed they are by the actions they are made to do. She felt this meant that, rather than Kris manipulating Noelle, it was solely the player who did. She suggested that, rather than being evil, the reason Kris removes the player from their heart may be a desire for agency.

TheGamer writer Sachi Go considered Kris among the best LGBTQ+ characters in video games, stating that while there has been debate over whether Kris is non-binary, she appreciated that a character using gender-neutral pronouns was nice to see at a time when the use of pronouns has become controversial with some. She commented that masculinity or femininity could be appropriately projected onto Kris, stating that Kris did not conform to either. RPGFan writer Stephanie Sybydlo felt that, as with Frisk, Kris lacked a canonical gender, and that players could view them as a self-insert. Sybydlo appreciated that the game uses they/them pronouns for Kris and wished this was more common in video games.

Following the release of Deltarune Chapter 2, memes surrounding Kris and Susie became popular on social media websites like YouTube, Twitter, Tumblr, and Reddit, in particular one where Susie says to Kris "God FUCKING damnit Kris where the FUCK are we" while in unusual settings, such as Doki Doki Literature Club! and the Sonic series. Polygon writer Ana Diaz praised the meme, and with fellow Polygon writer Nicole Clark considered it one of the best memes of 2021.

== Character analysis ==
Kris' nature as a silent protagonist and their potential relationship with the video game Undertale has been the subject of discussion by critics. After the release of Chapter 1, Paste writer Dante Douglas argued that, unlike the protagonist Frisk from Undertale, who is meant to be a player avatar, Kris is their own individual character. They listed various hints to this, including Kris acting of their own volition at times, and felt that these hints suggested that Deltarune was designed to complicate the "utopic" setting and plot of Undertale. They speculated that they bore a connection to Undertale's Chara due to having the same family makeup and circumstances, and suggested Kris may be evil and aware of Deltarune being a game. Kotaku writer Nathan Grayson, meanwhile, speculated that Kris was a similar character to Frisk, akin to Ralsei being like Asriel. He questioned whether the player's role in Kris' story is to guide them as players did with Frisk in Undertale, or if the player is taking over a person's life. Comic Book Resources writer Katie Schutze praised Deltarune, along with Undertale, stating that the use of a silent protagonist in both helps enhance both. They argued that, where other games use silent protagonists for player immersion, these games use them to delineate the character from the player, suggesting that the process of Kris and Frisk being controlled by the player may not be fully consensual. She felt that while Frisk had defined personality aspects through actions they may take, Kris has a lot more distinguishing features, like being viewed as mischievous and quiet, to the extent that them behaving nicely through the player's actions surprises some characters in the game.

The Washington Post writer Jhaan Elker believed that when Kris ripped the heart from their body, it was the game's way of conveying that the player no longer controlled Kris. Elker had multiple theories regarding Kris' role and actions in the game, believing that there were two likely reasons for Kris' actions, including opening fountains. One was them missing their older brother and refusing to let go of their childhood. They believe that Ralsei resembling Asriel and his name being a rearranged version of this supported this, that Kris wanted to relive these childhood experiences. The other explanation is that Kris is secretly Chara, arguing that their clothing and violent tendencies after ripping out their heart support this as a possibility. PC Gamer writer Ana Diaz felt that multiple scenes in the game emphasized how Kris is more than just an "empty vessel". These included a beginning scene where the player creates a vessel that is rejected before they are made to control Kris, and a scene where Kris controls a virtual Susie and vice versa in an in-game video game.
