= Peter Binoit =

German painter

Peter Binoit (c․ 1590 – 14 May 1632) was a German still life painter active during the early Baroque era at the beginning of the 17th century, who worked in Frankfurt am Main and Cologne.

== Life ==
Binoit created mainly still life paintings. He was active from 1613–1631 working in Frankfurt am Main and according to other sources in Cologne.

== Public collections ==
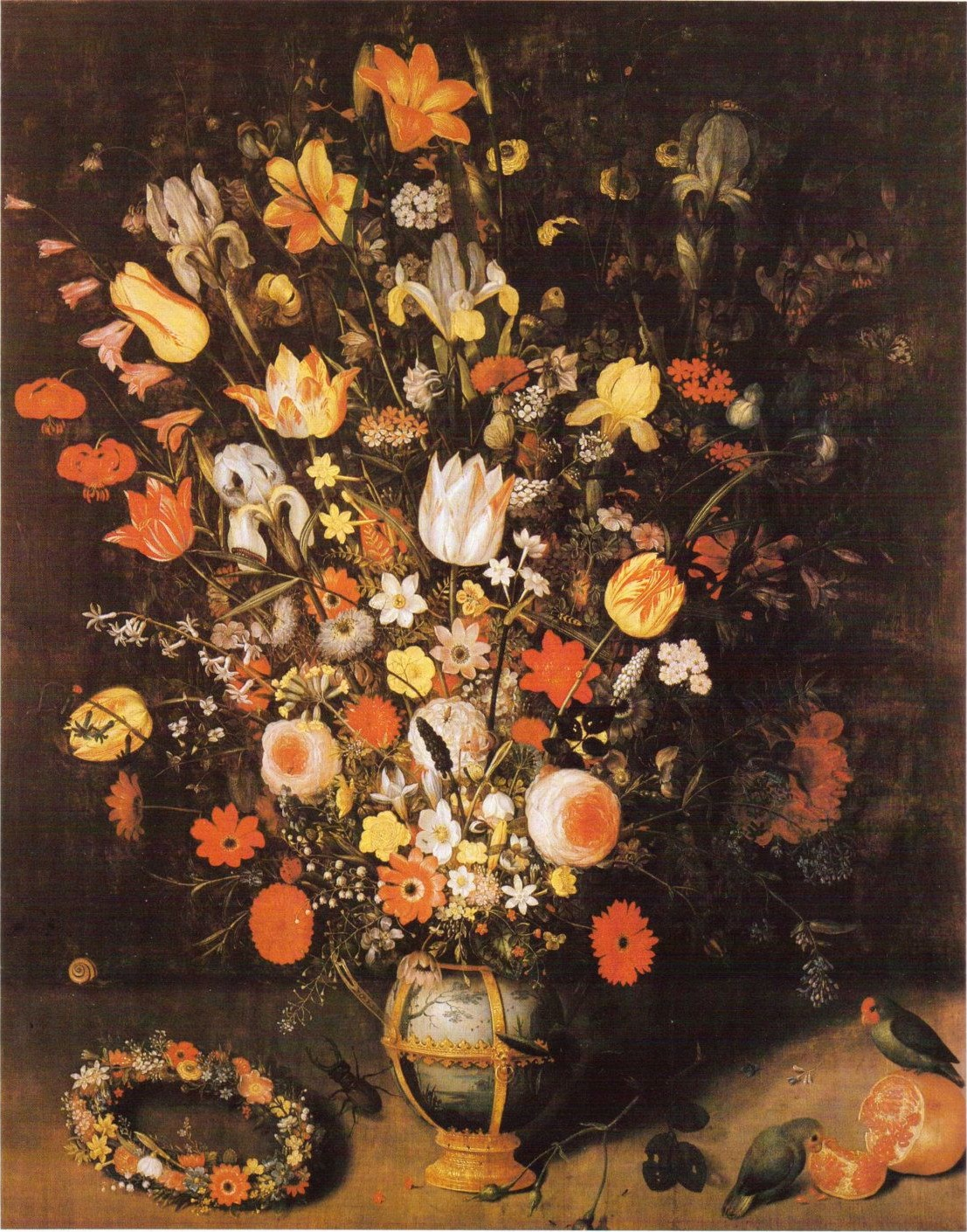
Vase with flowers, ca. 1620, at the Hessisches Landesmuseum

The Hessisches Landesmuseum in Darmstadt owns two flower-pieces. One bears his monogram and the date 1611, and the other painting is signed "P. BINOIT. FRANCFORT 1620". The Swedish Nationalmuseum in Stockholm holds a painting named "Still Life with a Meal".

At least two paintings are in Skokloster Castle, Stockholm county; one is a still life with dead birds showing a "large wicker basket on a table with red cloth. The basket is filled with dead birds (great tit, bullfinch, yellowhammer, chaffinch, possibly pine grosbeak, finch, sparrow, bullfinch, song thrush, snipe, heather hare in autumn, partridge (hen and rooster), dunlin in autumn plumes, mallard and Eurasian teal.) A bunch of skylarks hang on the wall. On the table are a red headed woodpecker and two domestic pigeons. In the upper left is a spiderweb and a spider. Signed in the lower right corner as PB. The frame bears an ink description "Painted by Frankfurter Master Peter Benoit 1613–31". The other is a still life of fruit and carnations in a vase, both from 1618.

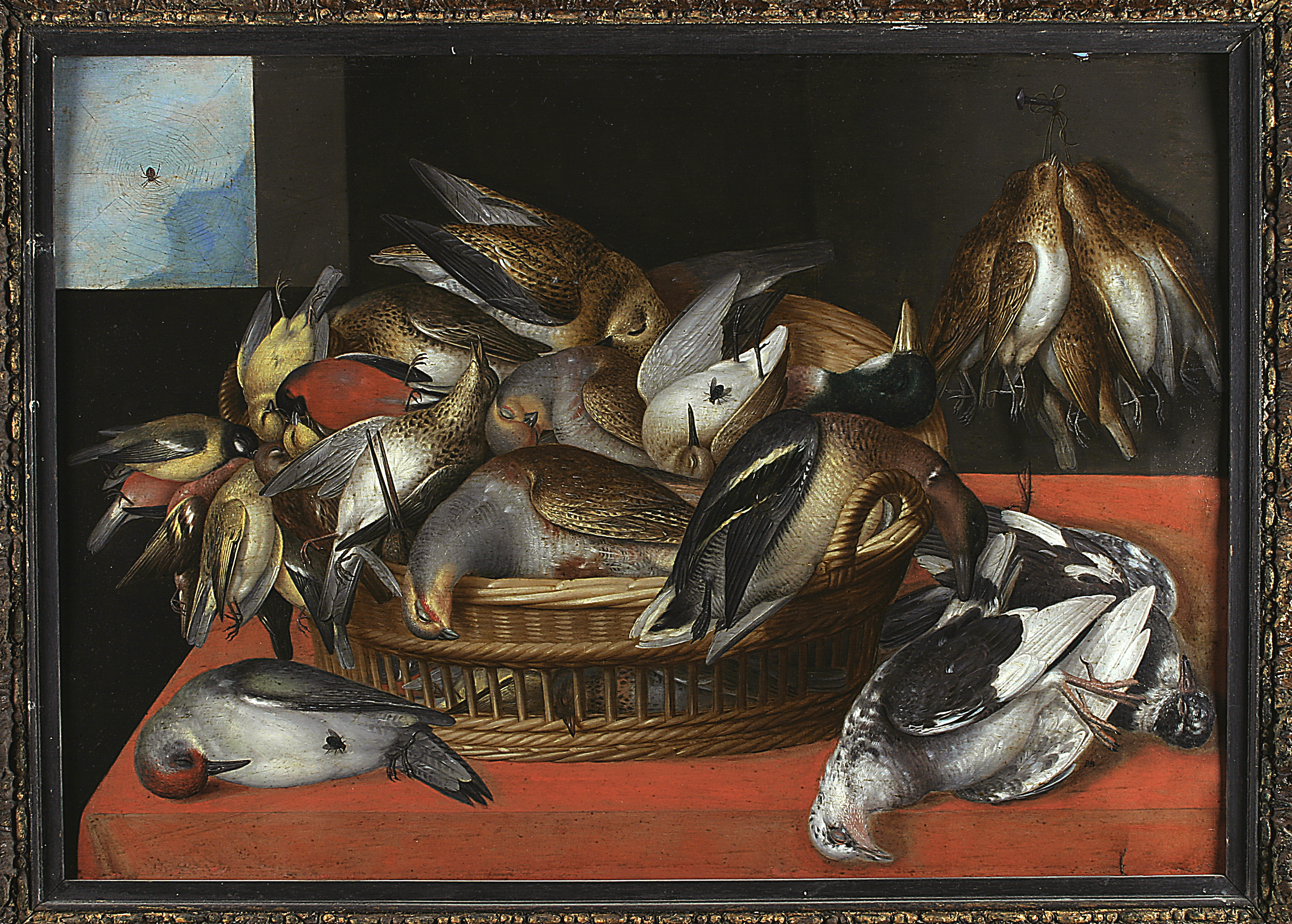
Still life of dead birds, ca. 1618, Skokloster Castle

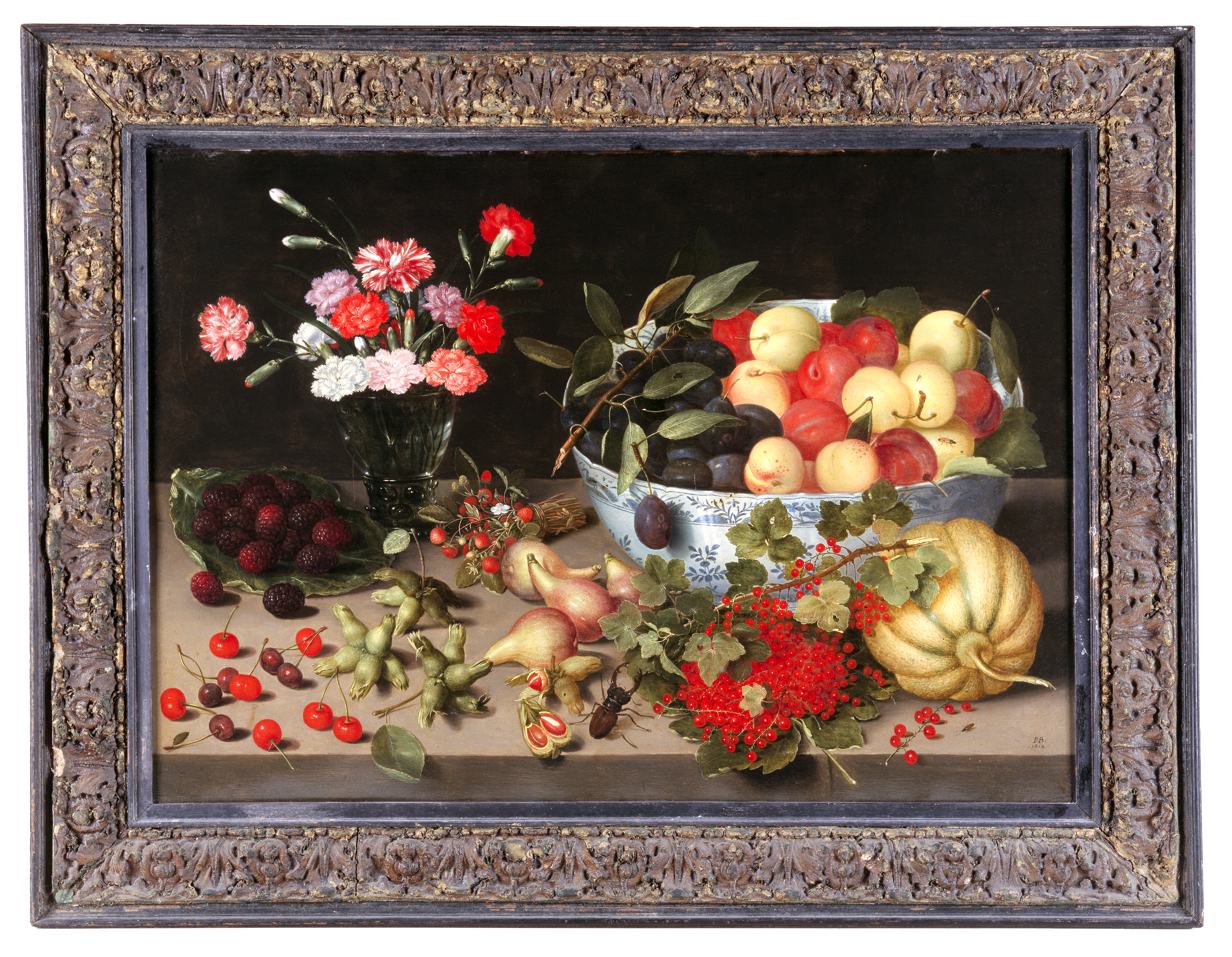
Still life with fruit and carnations in a vase, 1618, Skokloster Castle

== See also ==
- List of German painters
