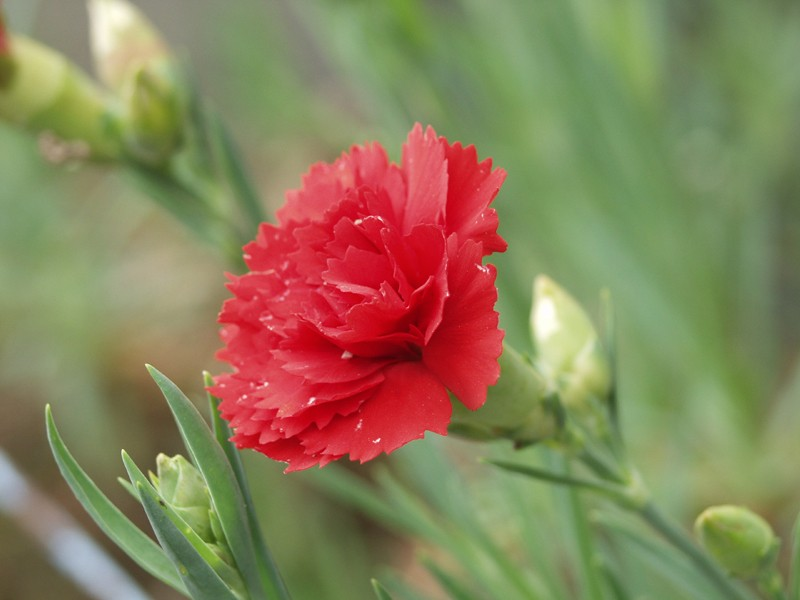
- Red carnations

Scientific classification
- Kingdom: Plantae
- Clade: Tracheophytes
- Clade: Angiosperms
- Clade: Eudicots
- Order: Caryophyllales
- Family: Caryophyllaceae
- Genus: Dianthus
- Species: D. caryophyllus

Binomial name
- Dianthus caryophyllus L.

= Dianthus caryophyllus =

Species of flowering plant

Dianthus caryophyllus (/daɪˈænθəs ˌkɛəriəˈfɪləs/ dy-AN-thəs KAIR-ee-ə-FIL-əs), commonly known as carnation or clove pink, is a species of Dianthus native to the Mediterranean region. While its exact natural range is uncertain due to extensive cultivation over the last 2,000 years, wild carnations are most common in the Mediterranean region. Carnations are prized for their wide variety of colors, delicate fringed petals, and fragrance, often described as spicy, clove-like, or reminiscent of a combination of cinnamon and nutmeg, hence the common name "clove pink". This aroma has made carnations a popular choice for use in perfumes, potpourri, and scented products. Culturally, carnations are associated with affection, distinction, and maternal love, with variations depending on color and area within its wide geographical range.

== Taxonomy ==
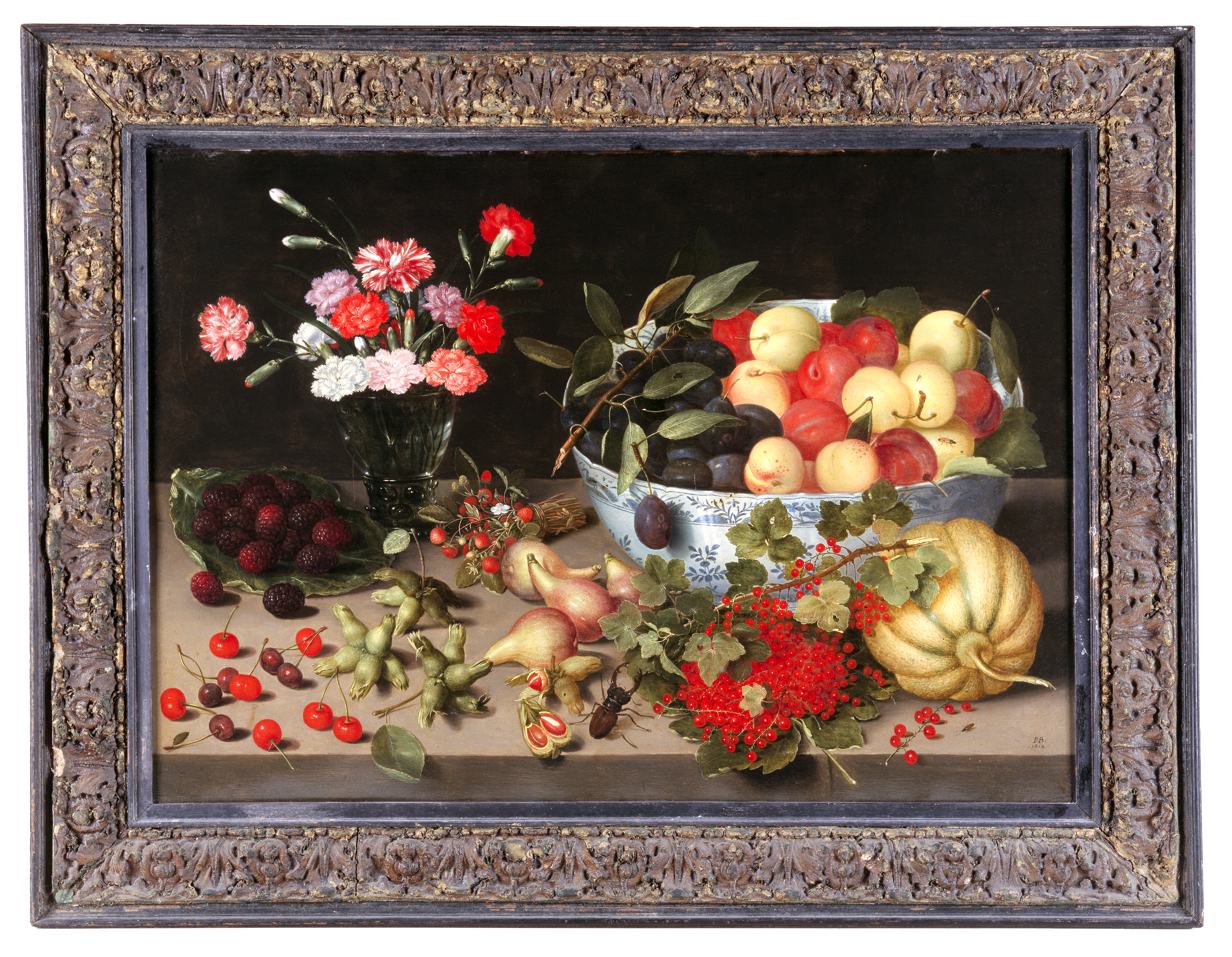
Peter Binoit, Stilleben, frukt – Still life with carnations, 1618

Carnations were mentioned in Greek literature 2,000 years ago. The term dianthus was coined by Greek botanist Theophrastus, and is derived from the Ancient Greek words for divine ("dios") and flower ("anthos"). The name "carnation" is believed to come from the Latin corona, a "wreath, garland, chaplet, crown", as it was one of the flowers used in Greek and Roman ceremonial crowns, or possibly from the Latin caro (genitive carnis), "flesh", which refers to the natural colour of the flower, or in Christian iconography incarnatio, "incarnation", God made flesh in the form of Jesus.

Carl Linnaeus described the carnation in volume one of his Species Plantarum in 1753, giving it the name Dianthus caryophyllus. Although originally applied to the species Dianthus caryophyllus, the name carnation is also often applied to some of the other species of Dianthus, and more particularly to garden hybrids between D. caryophyllus and other species in the genus.

== Description ==
Dianthus caryophyllus is a herbaceous perennial plant growing up to 80 cm (32 in) tall. The leaves are glaucous greyish green to blue-green, slender, and up to 15 cm (6 in) long. The flowers are produced singly or up to five together in a cyme; they are around 3–5 cm (1¼–2 in) in diameter, and sweetly scented. The original natural flower color is bright pinkish-purple, but cultivars of other colors, including red, pink, yellow, white, and green, have been developed. While sometimes dyed blue for cut bouquets, there are no known carnation cultivars that produce a true blue flower. The fragrant, hermaphrodite flowers have a radial symmetry. The four to six egg-shaped, sting-pointed scale leaves surrounding the calyx are only ¼ as long as the calyx tube.

== Distribution and habitat ==
The wild carnation is found in the Mediterranean countries of Portugal, Spain, Italy, Croatia, Albania, Greece and Turkey.

== Cultivation and uses ==
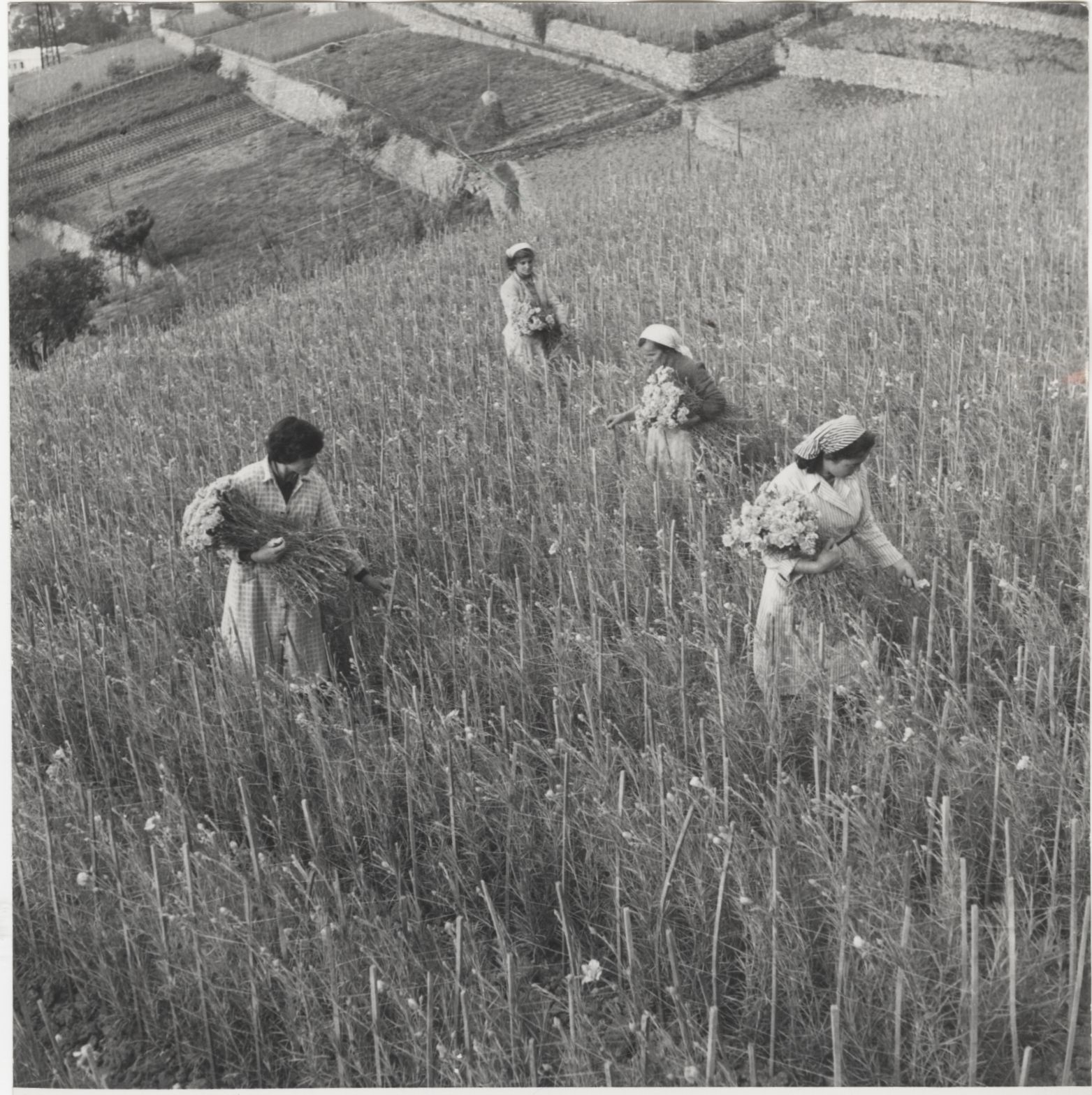
Women collecting carnations in Sanremo (Italy) in 1962

Carnations require well-drained, neutral to slightly alkaline soil, and full sun. Numerous cultivars have been selected for garden planting. Typical examples include 'Gina Porto', 'Helen', 'Laced Romeo', and 'Red Rocket'. They are used for medical purposes, such as for upset stomach and fever. Their fragrance was historically used for vinegar, beer, wine, sauces and salads.

Crossbreeding D. caryophyllus with D. capitatus results in a hybrid that is resistant to bacterial wilt from Paraburkholderia caryophylli. However, the flower is less attractive and so more breeding and backcrossing is needed to improve the flower. Carnation cultivars with no fragrance are often used by men as boutonnières or "buttonholes".

== Symbolism ==
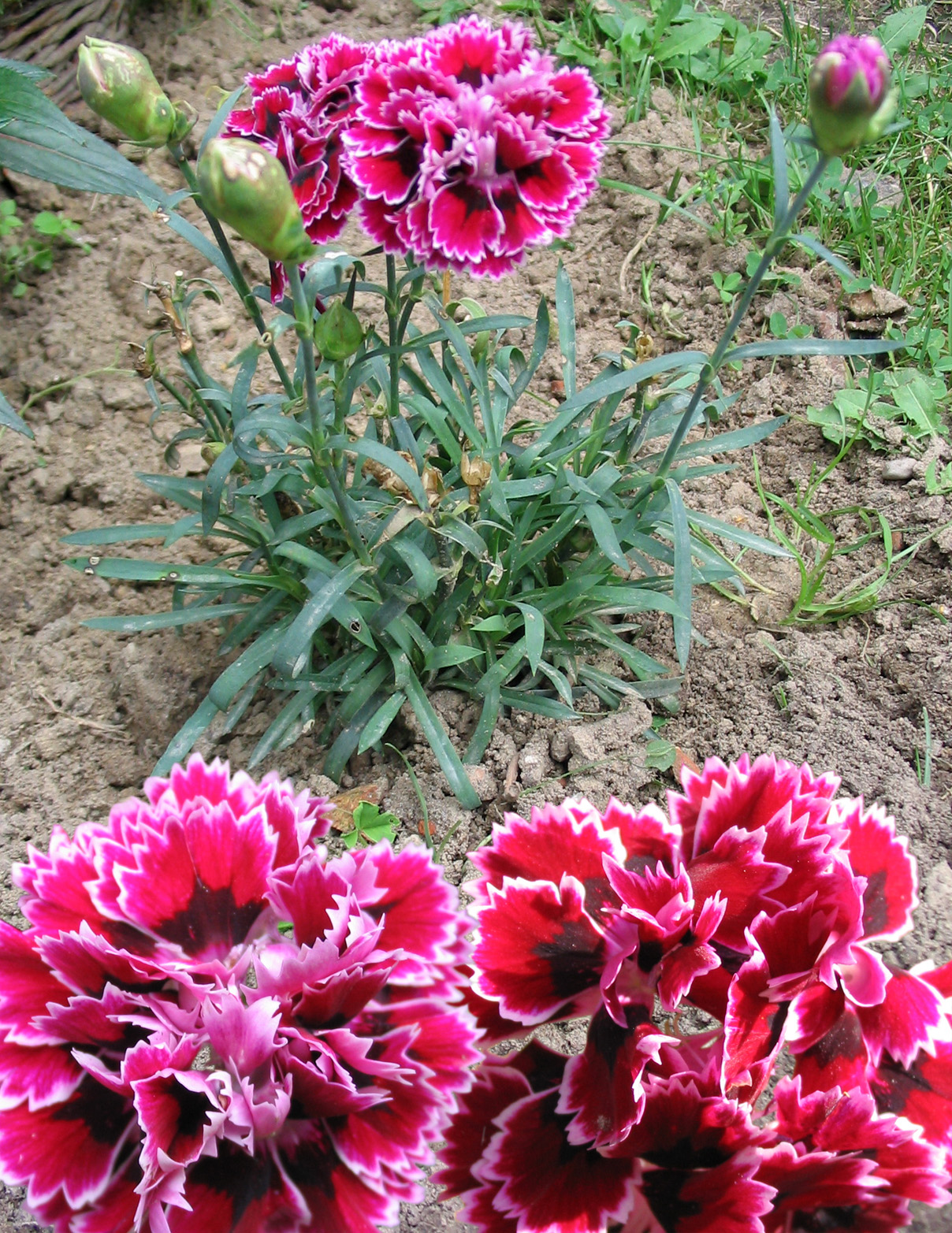
A carnation cultivar

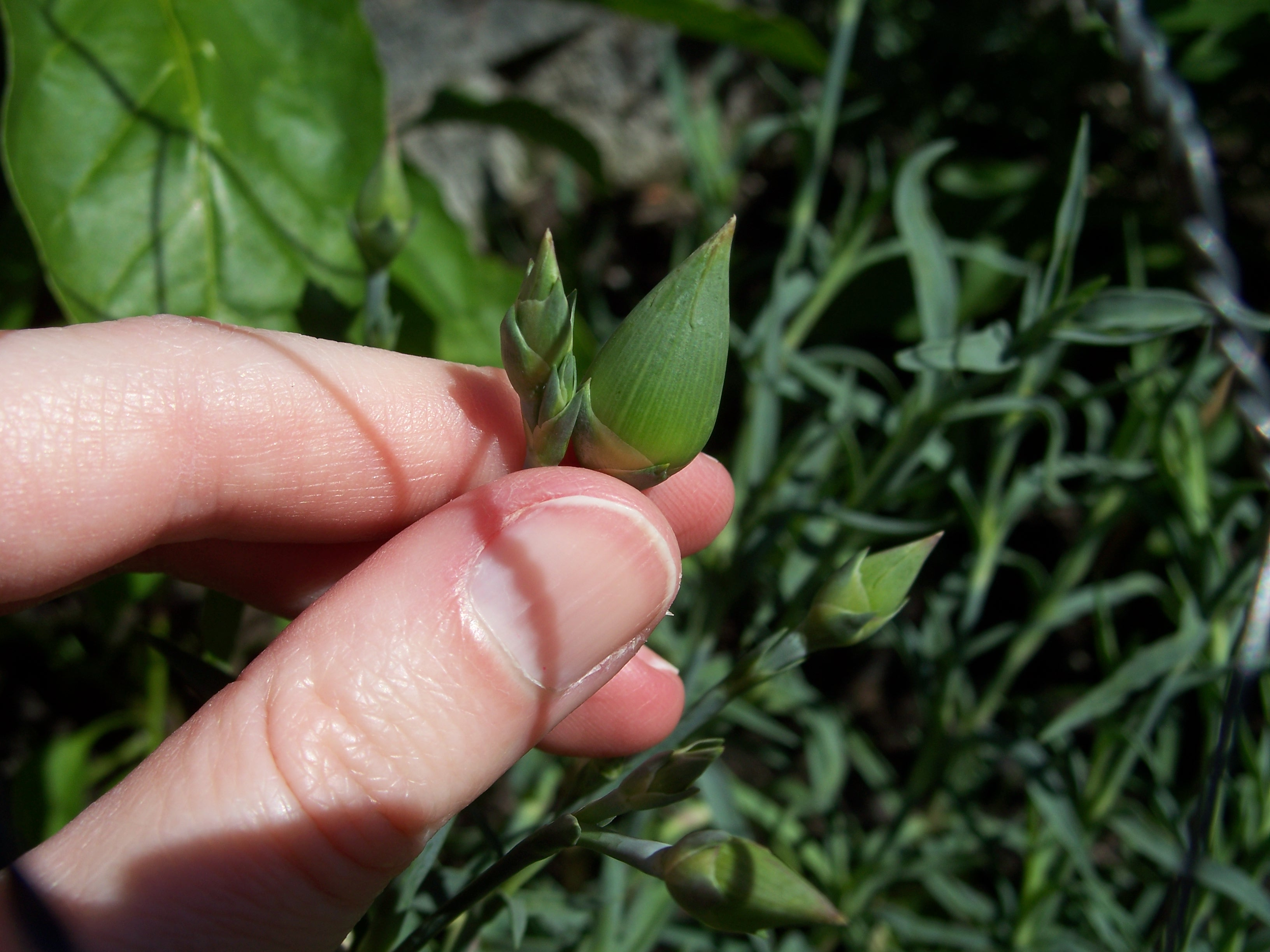
Flower buds

=== Traditional meanings ===
For the most part, carnations express love, fascination, and distinction, though there are many variations dependent on color.

- Along with the red rose, the red carnation can be used as a symbol of socialism, social democracy, democratic socialism, and the labour movement, and historically has often been used in demonstrations on International Workers' Day (May Day).
- In China, the carnation flower is the most frequently used flower in weddings.
- In Portugal, bright red carnations were used when in 1974 the authoritarian Estado Novo regime was overthrown; therefore, this transition (brought about by a combination of a coup d'état with civil resistance) is known as the Carnation Revolution.
- Light red carnations represent admiration, while dark red denote deep love and affection.
- White carnations represent pure love and good luck, while striped (variegated) carnations symbolise regret that a love cannot be shared.
- In the Netherlands, white carnations are associated with Prince Bernhard. He wore one during World War II and in a gesture of defiance some of the Dutch population took up this gesture. After the war the white carnation became a sign of the Prince, veterans and remembrance of the resistance.
- Purple carnations indicate capriciousness. In France, it is a traditional funeral flower, given in condolence for the death of a loved one.
- Carnation is the birth flower for those born in the month of January.
- Since Ottoman times, red carnations and tulips are used in the interior wall paintings of mosques in Turkey. It is often said that while tulips represent God, carnations is the symbol for Muhammad. However these flower designs are not unique to mosques but also used in many other Ottoman traditional art forms.
- In Azerbaijan, red carnations has turned into a symbol of mourning after the usage of the flower during Black January events of 1990, a violent crackdown on the civilian population of the country by USSR troops.
- In the United States, former U.S. President William McKinley considered the red carnation to be his lucky flower and often wore one on his lapel. Following his assassination in 1901, the State of Ohio adopted the red carnation as its state flower to honor McKinley.

The formal name for carnation, dianthus, comes from Greek for "heavenly flower", or the flower of Jove.

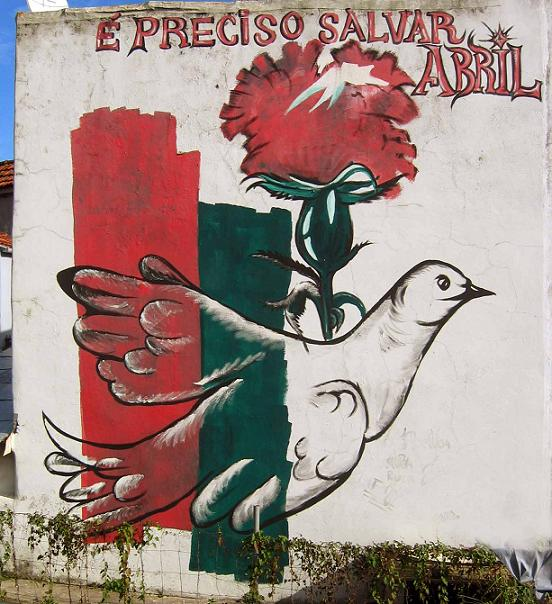
Mural commemorating the Portuguese Carnation Revolution

=== Holidays and events ===
Carnations are often worn on special occasions, especially Mother's Day and weddings. In 1907, Anna Jarvis chose a carnation as the emblem of Mother's Day because it was her mother's favourite flower. This tradition is now observed in the United States and Canada on the second Sunday in May. Jarvis chose the white carnation because she wanted to represent the purity of a mother's love. This meaning has evolved over time, and now a red carnation may be worn if one's mother is alive, and a white one if she has died.

In Slovenia, red carnations are sometimes also given to women on Women's Day, the 8th of March; however, nowadays orchids or roses are often given as well. In Korea, carnations express admiration, love, and gratitude. Red and pink carnations are worn on Parents Day (Korea does not separate Mother's Day or Father's Day, but has Parents Day on 8 May). Sometimes, parents wear a corsage of carnation(s) on their left chest on Parents Day. Carnations are also worn on Teachers Day (15 May).

Red carnations are worn on May Day as a symbol of socialism and the labour movement in some countries, such as Austria, Italy, and successor countries of the former Yugoslavia. The red carnation is also the symbol of the Carnation Revolution in Portugal thanks to Celeste Caeiro. Green carnations are for St. Patrick's Day and were famously worn by the gay Irish writer Oscar Wilde. The green carnation thence became a symbol of homosexuality in the early 20th century, especially through the book The Green Carnation and Noël Coward's song, "We All Wear a Green Carnation" in his operetta, Bitter Sweet. In communist Czechoslovakia and in Poland in times of the People's Republic of Poland, carnations were traditionally given to women on the widely celebrated Women's Day, together with commodities that were difficult to obtain, such as tights, towels, soap, and coffee.

After the 1990 uprisings against Soviets in Azerbaijan in which 147 Azerbaijani civilians were killed, 800 people were injured, and five people went missing, the carnation has become a symbol of the Black January tragedy associated with the carnations thrown into the puddles of blood shed in the streets of Azerbaijan subsequent to the massacre.

At the University of Oxford, carnations are traditionally worn to all examinations; white for the first exam, pink for exams in between, and red for the last exam. One story explaining this tradition relates that initially a white carnation was kept in a red inkpot between exams, so by the last exam it was fully red; the story is thought to originate in the late 1990s.

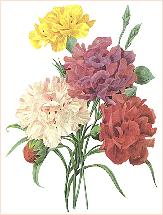
Carnations painted by Pierre-Joseph Redouté

Carnations are the traditional first wedding anniversary flower. Carnations are also known as the "Flower of God". The Greek name for carnation is a fusion of "dios" and "anthos". Dios is used to describe Zeus while Anthos means flower; thus the name "flower of God" is attached to it.

=== Symbols of territorial entities and organizations ===
The carnation is the national flower of Spain, Monaco, and Slovenia, and the provincial flower of the autonomous community of the Balearic Islands. The state flower of Ohio is a scarlet carnation, which was introduced to the state by Levi L. Lamborn. The choice was made to honor William McKinley, Ohio governor and U.S. president, who was assassinated in 1901, and regularly wore a scarlet carnation on his lapel.

== Colors ==
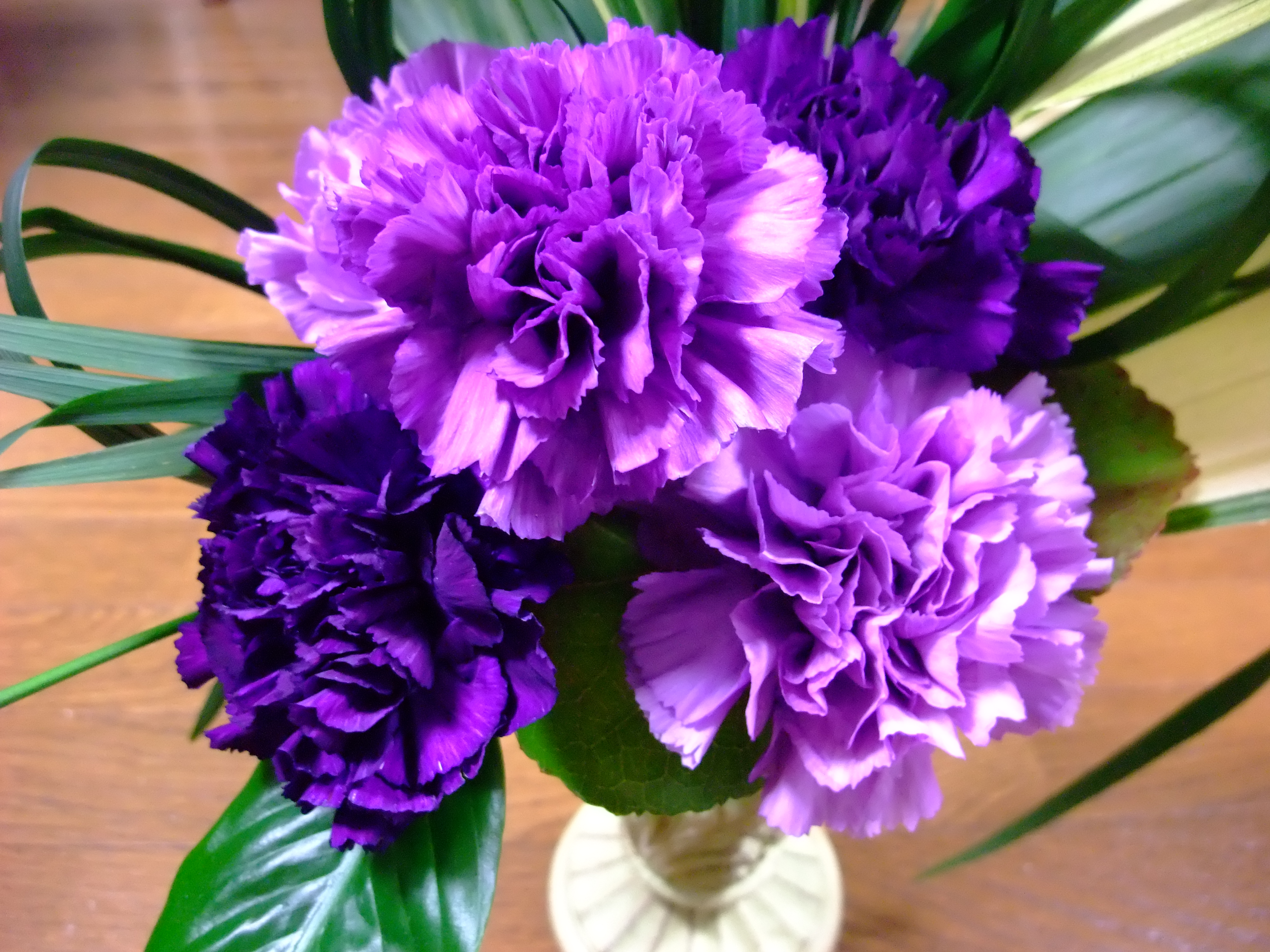
The transgenic cultivar 'Moondust'

Carnations do not naturally produce the pigment delphinidin, and thus a blue carnation cannot occur by natural selection or be created by traditional plant breeding. It shares this characteristic with other widely sold flowers like roses, lilies, tulips, chrysanthemums, and gerberas.

Around 1996, a company, Florigene, used genetic engineering to extract certain genes from petunia and snapdragon flowers to produce a blue-mauve carnation, which was commercialized as Moondust. In 1998, a violet carnation called Moonshade was commercialized. As of 2004, three additional blue-violet/purple varieties have been commercialized.

== See also ==
- List of Award of Garden Merit dianthus
