= Nufarm =

Australian agricultural chemical company

Nufarm Limited
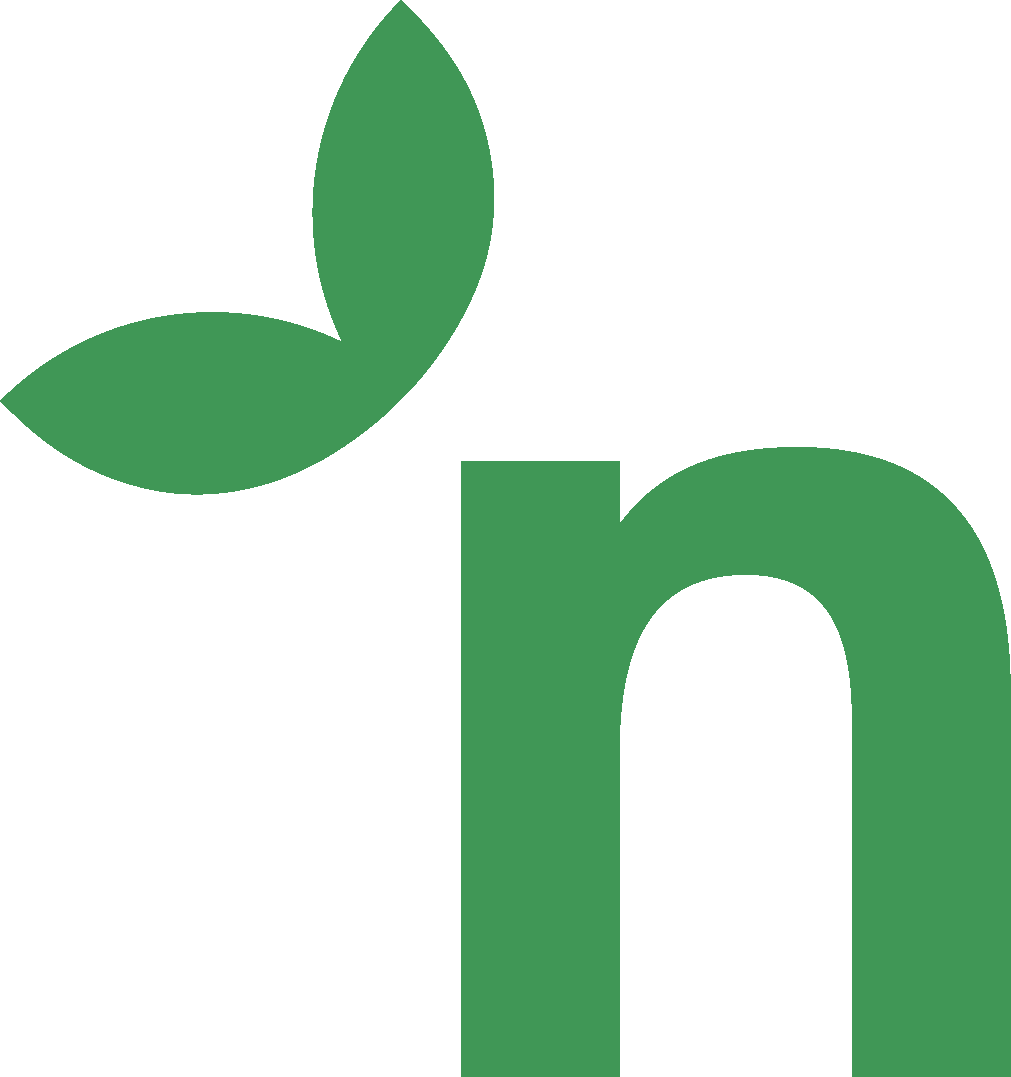
- Type: Public
- Traded as: ASX: NUF
- Industry: Chemicals
- Founded: 1956
- Founder: Max Fremder
- Headquarters: Melbourne
- Key people: John Gillam, Chairman; Greg Hunt, MD & CEO
- Products: agrochemicals industrial chemicals
- Revenue: ▲ A$3.48 billion (FY2024)
- Net income: ▼ A$38 million (FY2019)
- Number of employees: 2,811 (2022)

Nufarm is an Australian agricultural chemical company headquartered in Melbourne, Australia. Established in 1956, the company was founded by Max Fremder. It holds more than 2,100 product registrations, and markets products in more than 100 countries around the world.

The company is a manufacturer of phenoxies, a class of herbicides that controls and eradicates broadleaved weeds. These products are manufactured in globally networked facilities in Australia, England, Austria and the Netherlands.

A large range of other crop protection products are produced in manufacturing facilities in Australia, New Zealand, Asia, Europe, Africa and America.

Nufarm has also developed a position in the turf and specialty markets (lawn care, golf courses, municipal parks, aquatic and forestry weed control).

Nufarm is listed on the Australian Stock Exchange (symbol NUF) and its head office is located at Laverton in Melbourne. As at close on Friday 4 October 2019, its ordinary share capital was valued at AUD$6.49, implying a market capitalisation of AUD$2.45 billion.

== History ==
Nufarm was established in Melbourne, Australia during the mid 1950s by Max Fremder. He began selling phenoxy herbicides to professional spray applicators in regional Victoria.

Between the mid 1980s and early 2000s, Nufarm was a subsidiary of New Zealand-based Fernz Corporation. The Nufarm crop protection business continued to grow and expand during that period, with several overseas locations established throughout the 1990s.

In 2000, Fernz migrated the incorporation of the company from New Zealand to Australia and in the process changed the group's name to Nufarm Limited. Since that time, the company has focused on building a global platform for its core crop protection business and has divested various industrial and specialty chemical businesses.

Various acquisitions and solid organic growth have seen the business rapidly expand. Nufarm is now ranked the 9th largest crop protection company in the world, with a clear leadership position in Australia and substantial operations in North and South America, Europe, New Zealand and Asia.

On 30 September 2019 Nufarm announced the sale of all its South American crop protection and seed treatment operations to Sumitomo Chemical for $1,188 million.
