= Emtek (hardware) =

American door and cabinet hardware manufacturer

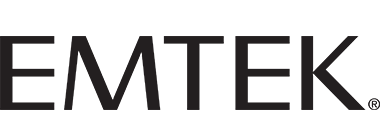
- Industry: door and cabinet hardware manufacturer
- Founded: 1981; 45 years ago
- Headquarters: City of Industry, Los Angeles County, United States
- Key people: Tom Millar (Founding CEO); Steve Kamp (Current VP and General Manager)
- Owner: Independent (1981–99); ASSA ABLOY (1999–2023); Fortune Brands Innovations (2023–present)
- Website: www.emtek.com

Emtek is a door and cabinet hardware manufacturer based in the City of Industry, Los Angeles County. Since 2023, the company has been owned by Fortune Brands Innovations.

== History ==
Founded in 1981, Emtek began making a limited range of solid brass door levers for specialty hardware dealers in the Los Angeles area; they are now distributed through all of North America. Based in City of Industry, it has three facilities for product assembly, shipping, management, and customer service.

The company produces a range of residential lock products, including tubular locks, interior door knobs and levers, key locking hardware sets, electronic keyless locks, deadbolts, hinges, dutch door bolts and Mortise locks. Represented by dealers and showrooms in the United States, Latin America and Canada, it also provides cabinet and drawer pulls for interior spaces like Kitchen cabinets and bathroom cabinets.

Previously controlled by Swedish conglomerate ASSA ABLOY since 1999, Emtek and its sister brand, Schaub hardware, were acquired in 2023 by Fortune Brands Innovations. With that, the Deerfield, Illinois-based home and security products maker now manages the brands as part of a portfolio already comprising Moen, the House of Rohl, Master Lock, SentrySafe and Therma-Tru.

== Media ==
Emtek's products have been featured in interior design magazines like HGTV magazine, This Old House, Architectural Digest, Elle Decor, House Beautiful, and Veranda, in online publications like Design Milk as well as in consumer publications like the Washington Post.

Their hardware is also featured in HGTV Star Vern Yip's book "Design Wise: Your Smart Guide to A Beautiful Home". In collaboration with L.A. based designers Commune (designers), Emtek was the hardware provider for the Architectural Digest Oscar Green Room in 2015.
