= Fortune Brands =

Fortune Brands may refer to:

- Fortune Brands (1969–2011), a defunct holding company
- Fortune Brands Home & Security, a manufacturer of home and security products
