= EuroMiniStorage =

Self-storage company in Canada and Eastern Europe

EuroMiniStorage is a self storage company founded by a group of Canadian investors in Central and Eastern Europe. It is the largest personal self-storage company in Romania and Hungary, being the first to offer large-scale purpose built and industry standard facilities both in Budapest and Bucharest.

The company has two locations, one in each city it operates, with a total investment over 15 million Euros. The facility in Hungary has a gross area of 7800 square meters on three floors and over 1000 storage units available in 5800 square meters of leasable area. In 2009, this facility won CIJ Best Warehouse/Logistics Award for Hungary. The facility in Romania has a gross area of 7500 square meters on three floors and over 1000 storage units available in 5600 square meters of leasable area.

== Operations ==
The company rents self-service individually lockable space and has a strong focus on security and convenience: it offers individually alarmed units, 24-hour on site security, video surveillance, magnetic card access control, perimeter fencing and automatically closing entrance doors. The unit sizes vary from 1 sqm to 27 sqm of which there are direct access units and heated internal units. Euro Mini Storage also provides accessories for storage such as boxes, packaging material, foil and padlocks. Moving assistance and insurance are offered to customers through third party service providers on site.

== Marketing ==
EuroMiniStorage markets itself as the company that helps people free their homes of things they don't need for the moment and “reclaim their living space”. Being a novelty both in Romania and Hungary it created a wave of interest from national business media that covered the news as a “modern business idea”.

The company had to educate the market about the advantages of their system in an unusual way. This varied from creating a print campaign and a series of funny viral internet clips, to creating several unconventional media executions like parking disassembled bicycles in public bathrooms. This action, together with the prints and the viral clips, depict what happens when hobbies hinder people and their free space emphasizing the message “hobbies should occupy your time, not your space”. The company promotes itself even through a spoof (parody) of a famous Heineken ad.

The company is also involved in helping different Romanian NGOs offering them storage space for their materials or bicycles.
