= Rotary combination lock =

Locking mechanism

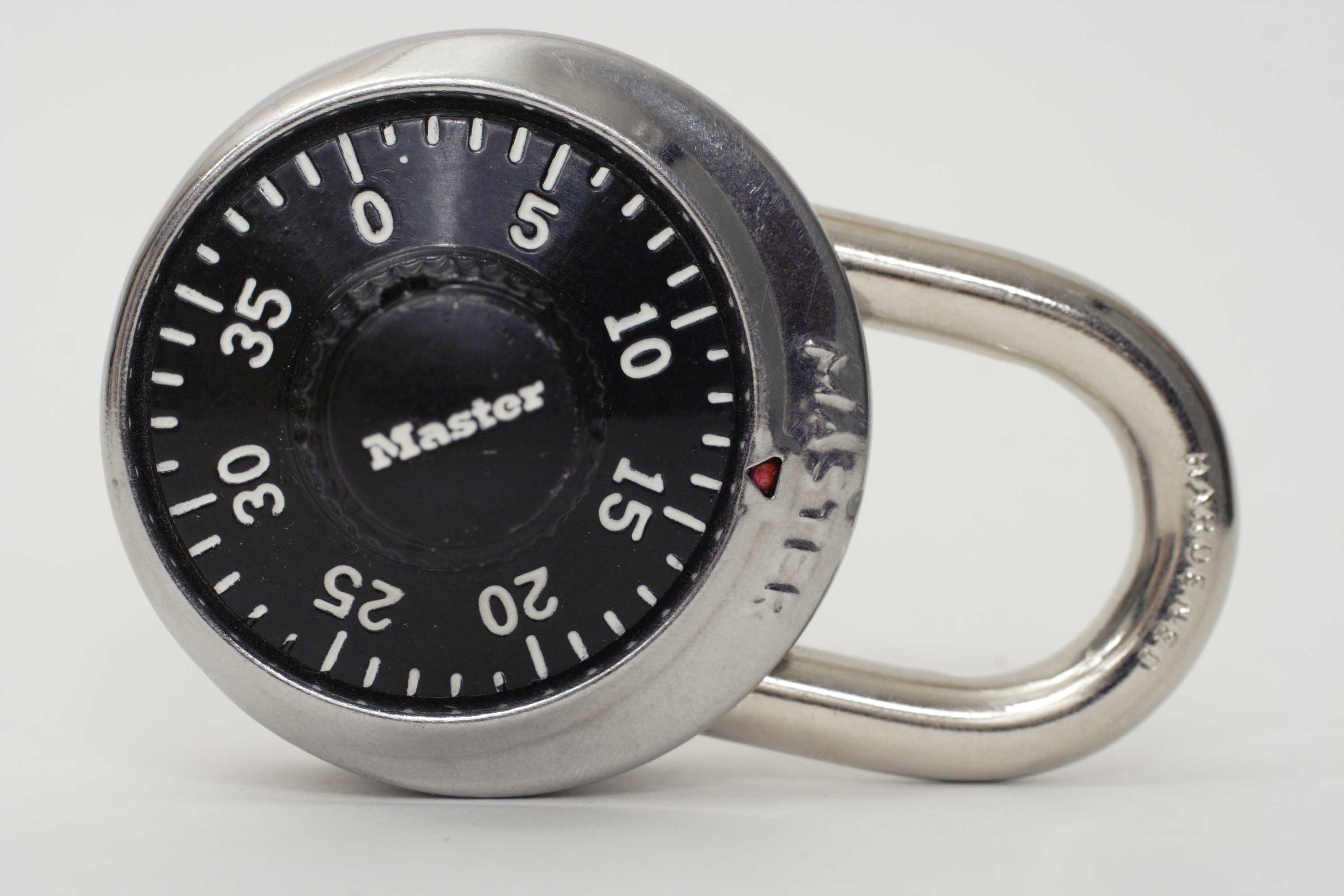
A rotary dial combination padlock

A rotary combination lock is a lock commonly used to secure safes and as an unkeyed padlock mechanism. This type of locking mechanism consists of a single dial which must be rotated left and right in a certain combination in order to open the lock.

== Design and operation ==
Internal mechanism of a rotary combination lock with a retractable bolt.

An externally-accessible dial is manipulated to release the shackle of a padlock or a lock bolt securing a door. The dial is connected to an internal mechanism, usually containing three separate wheels with notches, called gates. Each wheel must be aligned to allow a fence to drop into the gates, releasing the lever that holds the lock in place, allowing the lock to open. Generally, this is accomplished by moving the dial to three (or more) positions, usually denoted by numbers, in a specific sequence of alternating clockwise and anti-clockwise turns.

The wheels are generally arranged in a stacked wheel pack sharing a single axis of rotation, and the individual rotary position of each wheel can be manipulated by turning the dial left and right. The dial is mechanically connected via its spindle to a cam that is equipped with a drive pin — a sort of nub — that can engage a corresponding small catch (known as a fly) on the side of the closest wheel facing the cam; the fly either can be fixed or move within a limited range. On the opposite face of that closest first wheel is another drive pin, which can engage a fly on the side of the second wheel (next-closest to the cam) that is facing the first wheel. Similarly, the second wheel has another drive pin on its opposite face that can engage a fly on the third wheel. Many combination locks have three wheels, but the lock may be equipped with additional wheels, each with a drive pin and fly, in a similar manner. The number of wheels in the mechanism determines the number of specific dial positions that must be entered to open the lock, so a three-sequence combination is required for a three-wheel lock.

As the dial rotates, there will not be enough space for the drive pin on the cam to pass the fly on that face of the first wheel closest to the cam, and so the first wheel will begin to rotate with the dial once the drive pin on the cam engages the fly of the first wheel. The first wheel (closest to the cam) is said to be picked up when this occurs. As this first wheel rotates, its drive pin will in turn engage the fly on the second wheel and the second wheel will begin rotating with the dial and the closest wheel in a similar fashion. Once all wheels are "picked up" and rotating together with the dial, the dial is rotated until the first position/number of the combination is indicated, which means the wheel furthest from the cam is in place and its gate is aligned under the fence. The number of wheels also determines the number of rotations past the first position required to reset the lock; since picking up all the wheels requires a number of rotations equal to the number of wheels, the final wheel (furthest from the cam) cannot be not picked up and positioned until the minimum number of rotations is completed.

After the furthest wheel is positioned, by reversing the rotation of the dial, all the drive pins and flys disengage; as the dial continues to rotate in the opposite direction, the cam will again "pick up" the wheels in sequence (starting from the first wheel, closest to the cam) until all the wheels (save the wheel furthest from the cam) rotate together. In this way, the remaining wheels are rotated without disturbing the alignment of the furthest wheel. Once the second position/number is indicated, the next-to-furthest wheel is in place and its gate is properly aligned with the fence. The rotation of the dial is then reversed again until the remaining wheels are picked up and the gate of the next wheel is aligned with the fence. In this way, by turning the dial back and forth to the correct sequence of positions, all the wheels will be aligned with their gates positioned under the fence.

Unlocking sequence

Gates aligned with fence

Fence drops into gates, cam engages lever nose

Bolt drawn as cam continues to rotate

Once the gates are aligned on all the wheels, the fence drops into the gates, allowing the nose of the lever to engage with a corresponding gate in the cam. Further rotation of the dial moves the lever, retracting the locking mechanism and opening the lock.

When the cams are aligned and the shackle is put back in (after it was taken out after unlocking), the force required to push it back in rattles the system and may often cause the cams lose their alignment, thus locking once more.

=== Wheel sandwich construction ===
Wheels are typically made of a three-layer sandwich. The outer layers, known as the wheel case, contain the gate and surround the externally-toothed wheel center, change key cam, and lever arms. When a change key is inserted into the lock mechanism, it forces apart the lever arms, which then permits the wheel center to rotate freely. This in turn allows the owner to set a custom combination.

=== Additional security ===
Some rotary combination locks include internal relockers or relocking devices that separately lock the shackle or bolt when an attack is detected, including mechanical levers that respond to attempts to dislodge the locking mechanism ("punching"), thermal (fusible) links that melt in response to a cutting attempt, or tempered glass that breaks in response to a drilling attempt.

Wheels may be made of radiotransparent materials such as Nylon, Lexan, or Delrin to prevent the use of X-ray imaging to determine the wheel position and required combination.

== See also ==
- Combination lock
- Safes
