= Stanadyne =

American automotive parts company

Stanadyne LLC
- Formerly: Hartford Machine Screw Company and Standard Screw Company
- Type: Private company LLC
- Industry: Automotive industry
- Founded: 1876; 150 years ago
- Headquarters: Jacksonville, North Carolina, United States
- Area served: Worldwide
- Products: Fuel pumps and fuel injectors
- Owner: Cerberus Capital Management
- Website: www.stanadyne.com

Stanadyne (originally known as Stanadyne Automotive Corporation) is an American developer and manufacturer of fuel pumps and fuel injectors for diesel and gasoline engines. The company specializes in fuel injection equipment producing components for gasoline direct injection engines, Common rail systems, electronic and mechanical governed rotary distributor pumps for diesel engines and diesel fuel injectors.

The company is based in Windsor, Connecticut, with global locations in Changshu, China (Stanadyne Changshu Corporation), Chennai, India (Stanadyne India Private Limited), Brescia, Italy (Stanadyne S.p.A.) and Sharjah, UAE (Stanadyne Mideast FZE). The company also operates a manufacturing facility in Jacksonville, NC. As of 2023, Stanadyne is owned by a group of investors led by private equity firm Cerberus Capital Management.

== History ==
=== Foundation and early years ===
The company was founded in 1876 as Hartford Machine Screw Company. It was renamed Standard Screw Company in 1900. The company added additional subsidiaries throughout the early part of the century.

=== New products (1947 - 1960) ===
In May 1947 a deal was made with Vernon D. Roosa to come to Hartford Machine Screw and perfect his fuel injection pump for diesel engines. The project initially cost more than expected with some directors in favor of abandoning, but by 1952 major bugs had been eliminated and the product was ready for market. The product became known as the Roosa pump.

The combined company primarily made screws and other fasteners until the 1950s, when they diversified into fuel injection pumps and consumer faucets. In 1956, a deal was struck with Ravenna Metal Projects to acquire the company's first real consumer product, the single-handle faucet developed by Alfred M. Moen.

=== Growth and name change (1960 - 1980) ===
Demand for diesel pumps climbed steadily through the 1950s and 60's. However, the oil crisis of the 1970s and General Motors' decision to install diesel engines in passenger cars, significantly stimulated pump sales. By the end of the decade, sales neared $120 million.

In March 1970 Standard Screw Company changed its name to Stanadyne.

After a series of false starts, the company initiated a program to sell faucets exclusively through plumbing wholesalers. This was later adapted to include retailers, and during the 1970s Moen sales rose from $40 million in 1972 to $100 million in 1979, one quarter of Stanadyne's total revenue.

=== Ownership changes (1980 - 2020) ===
In the late 1980s ownership and makeup of the company continued to change and evolve. After a series of offers from private equity firms, in 1988, Forstmann Little & Company bought Stanadyne for $820 million. The company's four business units were quickly sold.

KSP, another private New York investment firm, bought the automotive products group and the rights to the Stanadyne name in February 1989. KSP renamed the company, Stanadyne Automotive Corp.

American Industrial Partners owned Stanadyne from 1997 to 2004, when the company was sold to Kohlberg & Company.

=== Trouble and restructuring (2020 - Present) ===
On February 16, 2023, Stanadyne filed for Chapter 11 bankruptcy. This was resolved by August 2023 when an investment group led by Cerberus Capital Management agreed a buyout and restructuring of all the companies assets and invested additional capital.
