= Wilson Bohannan =

American padlock-manufacturer

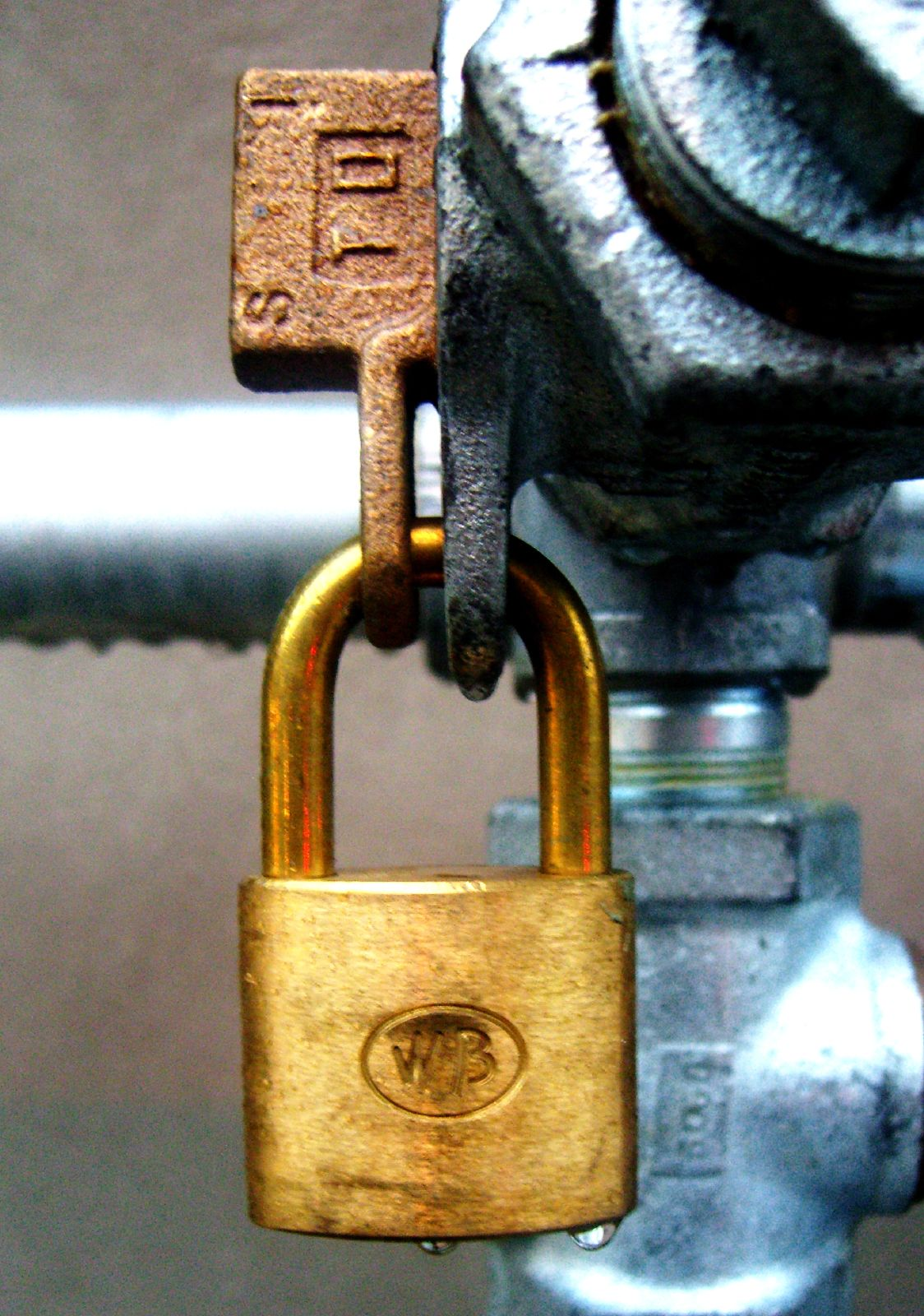
Wilson Bohannan brass padlock.

The Wilson Bohannan Lock Company (Marion, Ohio) has been manufacturing padlocks for almost 160 years. This makes them America's oldest continuous padlock maker. The founder Wilson Bohannan received his first padlock patent (No. 27,883) on April 17, 1860. In that patent his first name is spelled 'Wilsin', while in subsequent patents (Nos. 46,539, 55,047, 55,048, 67,401) his first name is spelled 'Wilson'. In the same year that his first patent was issued, he opened a small workshop in the rear of his Brooklyn home manufacturing padlocks. Outgrowing his home workshop, the company moved into larger quarters on Broadway and Kossuth Place, Brooklyn, New York in (or before) 1869. The company since then has moved its business in 1926 to Marion, Ohio where it currently is operating.
