= Susan Kilsby =

American investment banker and businesswoman

- Born: Susan R. Saltzbart; 1958 or 1959 (age 67–68)
- Education: Wellesley College; Yale School of Management
- Occupations: Banker and businesswoman
- Title: Chairman, Shire
- Board member of: Shire; BBA Aviation; Fortune Brands Home & Security; Goldman Sachs International
- Spouse: Richard Philip Kilsby (m. 1994)

Susan R. Kilsby (nee Saltzbart, born 1958 or 1959) is an American investment banker and businesswoman. She is the chairman of Shire.

== Early life ==
Kilsby, a native of New Jersey, was born circa 1958/59. She earned a bachelor's degree in Economics from Wellesley College and a master in business administration from the Yale School of Management.

== Career ==
Kilsby began her banking career at First Boston in the 1980s. She spent most of her career as an investment banker, working for Bankers Trust, Barclays de Zoete Wedd and Credit Suisse. While at Credit Suisse she is known for having advised Coca-Cola and Fortune Brands.

In 2002, she became the first woman to head a mergers and acquisitions department of any major bank, and she was co-chief executive of European M&A until 2009. She gave up a part-time advisory role at Credit Suisse when she took on the role of chairing Shire.

Kilsby has been on the board of Shire since September 2011 and the chairman since April 2014. She became a non-executive director of BBA Aviation in April 2012, Fortune Brands Home & Security in July 2015, and the first female non-executive director at Goldman Sachs International in May 2016.

In October 2019, Kilsby was appointed Senior Independent Director of Diageo plc in October 2019 after serving as a Non-Executive Director from 2018 and Chairman of the Remuneration Committee since 2019.

== Personal life ==
Kilsby met her husband, Richard Philip Kilsby when they were both managing directors at Bankers Trust. They married in 1994.
