= Wordlock =

Type of combination locks

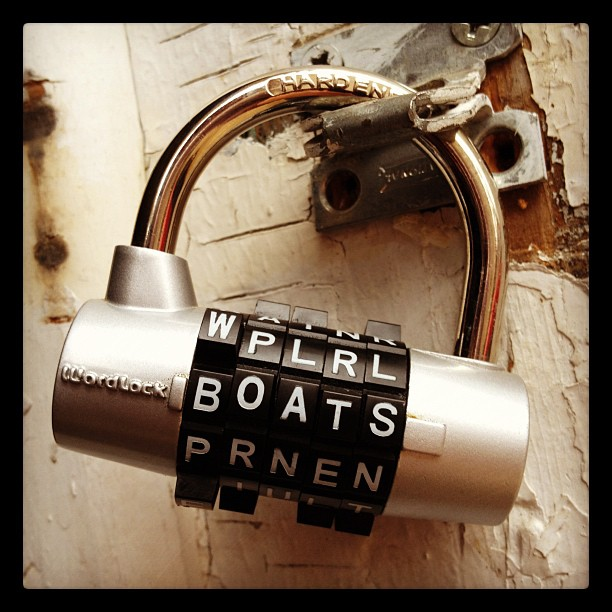
An example of a wordlock padlock

Wordlock is a brand of combination locks, made by Wordlock, Inc., that differs from traditional combination locks in that it has letters on its dials instead of numbers. This allows the combination to be a four-letter or five-letter word or name, similar to a password, and therefore potentially easier to remember than a series of digits. Wordlocks come in luggage locks, bike locks, padlocks, cable locks and commercial locks.

== History ==
The Chinese created the first word combination lock in the 13th Century. The idea never caught on in the West, however, until Todd Basche, former Vice President of Software Applications at Apple Inc., invented the modern word lock in 2004. He and Rahn Basche founded WordLock, Inc. in 2007 in Santa Clara, California, USA. Todd's patented WordLock algorithm maximizes the number of four-letter and five-letter words that can be spelled on the Wordlock dials.

WordLock won the Staples Inc. Invention Quest in 2004 and "Top 100 New Inventions" distinction at the U.S. Patent and Trademark Office's Invent Now America competition in 2008.

== Possible combinations ==
The five-ring WordLock contains 10 letters per ring. One such example follows:

Ring 1	Ring 2	Ring 3	Ring 4
b	l	a	d
p	r	n	s
h	u	m	n
m	h	l	m
t	n	r	p
w	r	t	y
d	a	a	e
l	e	u	k
t	f	s	t
b	k	l	e

Each ring rotates independently of the others, yielding a possible 10^{4} (or 10,000) different combinations. WordLock contains one blank space on the fifth dial to make four letter words. About 2,000 words are possible as combinations. However, this 2,000 word figure does not include the many possibilities for quasi-words (BLATS or WOOT); certain names (DILAN or MOSES); and acronyms, foreign words or gibberish known only to the lock owner.

== See also ==
- Cryptex
- Combination lock
