= Alfred M. Moen =

American inventor (1916–2001)

Alfred M. Moen (27 December 1916 – 17 April 2001) was an American inventor and founder of Moen Incorporated. He invented the single-handed mixing faucet. In 1959 Fortune magazine listed the Moen "one-handle mixing faucet", along with inventions such as Henry Ford's Model T and Benjamin Franklin's Franklin stove, as one of the top 100 best-designed mass-produced products, the result of a survey among the world's leading designers, architects and design teachers conducted by industrial designer Jay Doblin.

== Background ==
Al Moen was born in Seattle, Washington. He graduated in 1934 from Franklin High School and was a mechanical engineering student at the University of Washington.

== Invention ==
The inspiration for Al Moen's invention came in 1937 after he turned on a two-handle faucet and burned his hands. Over the next decade, Moen made several faucet designs and improvements. With the advent of World War II, he went to work as a tool designer at a military shipyard plant in Seattle. Moen could not find a manufacturer free to start production until after the war. In 1947, he persuaded Kemp Hiatt at Ravenna Metal Products of Seattle to finance and produce his latest design for a single-handled mixing faucet. Moen faucets were soon included in many homes built in the United States during the post-World War II building boom.

Moen's invention led to the creation of Moen Inc., one of the nation's major producers of plumbing products. Al Moen served as head of the company's research and development until his retirement in 1982. He personally held some 75 patents, many of which were in fields unrelated to plumbing. Al Moen was honored by being nominated for the National Inventors Hall of Fame. Moen was named to the Kitchen & Bath Industry Hall of Fame in 1993.

== Other sources ==
- About Moen | Al Moen and the Moen Story
