= Sentry Group =

American safe manufacturer

SentrySafe
- Type: Subsidiary
- Industry: Manufacturing
- Founded: 1930; 96 years ago
- Parent: Master Lock (2014–present)
- Website: www.sentrysafe.com

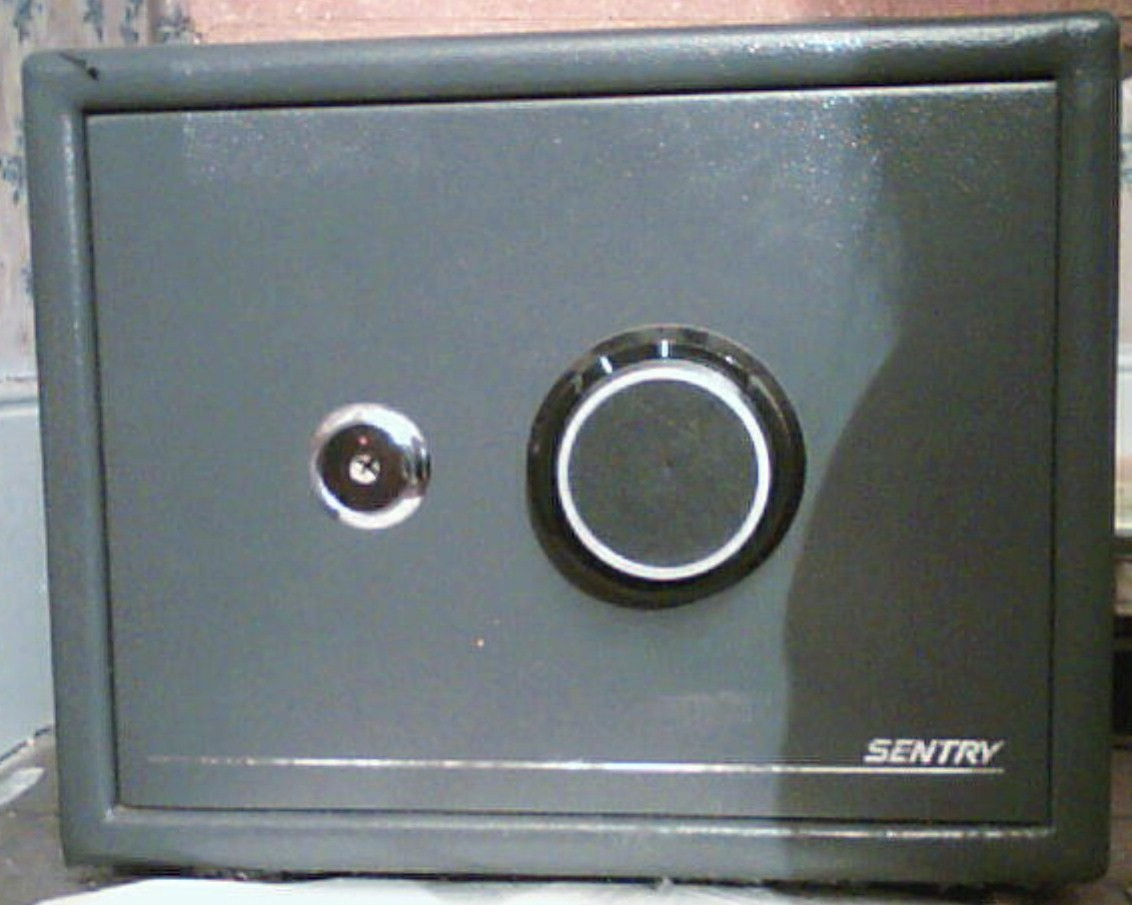
A SentrySafe safe; requires a combination and a four-way key

SentrySafe is a brand of safes manufactured in Rochester, New York. It is owned by the Master Lock Company. It markets safes designed for home and business. In addition to security, SentrySafe includes a range of Underwriters Laboratories (UL)-rated safes to protect valuables from both fire and water.

== History ==
In 1930, John Brush Sr. and his brother-in-law, Willard Punnett, opened a small shop for the manufacture of safes at 545 West Avenue in Rochester, New York. The Brush-Punnett Company was a pioneer in the stamping (metalworking) of steel safes. During a long and arduous startup period that spanned the Great Depression and World War II, the company had some success by selling safes to Vassar College for its dormitories and steel skids to Eastman Kodak.

The factory side entrance of the Linden Avenue plant in Rochester, New York. At the base of the silos are a furnace (used to fire-test safes) and a rock pit (used for drop-testing safes from a height of 30 ft.)

Brush & Co. moved into a new plant at 900 Linden Avenue in Rochester in 1968, with over 50,000 sq ft (5,000 m^{2}). In 1987, it began doing business under the name Sentry Group, in order to better identify the company with its trademark name in safes, "Sentry".

In 2014, Sentry was sold to Master Lock, which is a division of Fortune Brands Home & Security.

In 2016, Master Lock closed the Rochester, New York based production facilities and moved production to Mexico.

== Legal cases ==
In 1991, Michael Redman of Virginia brought a product liability suit against Sentry Group after his coin collection was stolen out of his Sentry Supreme Safe, Model #5570. Redman noticed the safe in a Value-Tique advertisement that appeared in the magazine Coin World. The magazine had advertised the safe as a "burglar deterrent".

Redman won the jury verdict in district court, but the case was appealed. The United States Court of Appeals for the Fourth Circuit reversed the decision, holding that Redman failed to present evidence demonstrating that the safe violated industry standards, government standards, or reasonable consumer expectations. Redman's safe was specifically designed to meet fire-resistant standards, but not "burglar deterrent" standards, even though it did provide "a degree of protection against burglary".

== See also ==
- Gun safe – Safe for storing firearms
