= Harry Soref =

American locksmith and businessman (1887–1957)

Harry E. Soref (1887–1957) was an American locksmith and businessman. He was the founder of the Master Lock company.

== Biography ==
Soref was born in 1887 Bilozirka, Ukraine, then part of the Russian Empire, later immigrating to the United States. In 1921, he founded the Master Lock company in Milwaukee, Wisconsin. The company built locks based on Soref's designs using laminated steel to build strong yet inexpensive locks; he received over 80 patents for his designs.

Soref and his wife Bertha had five children. He died in 1957 in Phoenix, Arizona, aged 70.
