= Master Lock =

American lock company

Master Lock Company
- Type: Subsidiary
- Founded: 1921; 105 years ago
- Headquarters: Oak Creek, Wisconsin, United States
- Products: Padlocks, safes, and security products
- Parent: Fortune Brands Innovations
- Website: www.masterlock.com

Master Lock Company is an American company that sells padlocks, combination locks, safes, and related security products. Now a subsidiary of Fortune Brands Innovations, Master Lock Company LLC was formed in 1921 by locksmith-inventor Harry Soref and is headquartered in Oak Creek, Wisconsin. In 1970, the company was purchased by American Brands from Soref's heirs. American Brands was later renamed to Fortune Brands, which then split on October 3, 2011, to create the Fortune Brands Home & Security company and the beverages company Beam Inc. (which was then soon purchased by Suntory).

== History ==
=== 20th century ===
Before co-founding the company in 1921, Harry Soref had been a traveling locksmith in the U.S., Canada, and Mexico, had invented a lock for protecting military equipment, and had founded the "Master Key" company for making master skeleton keys. In 1919, Soref then invented a padlock design that used laminated steel layers to economically produce an exceptionally strong lock body.

He tried unsuccessfully to get some large companies interested in using his design, so he and two friends—P. E. Yolles and Sam Stahl,—worked together to found the Master Lock company in Milwaukee in 1921 to produce the locks themselves, initially with five employees. In 1924, the company was granted the first patent on such a laminated lock design. Stahl led the company to become a major manufacturer of locks and the three co-founders worked closely together until Soref's death in 1957. However, the brand had not yet reached its peak status as a familiar consumer brand at the time of Soref's death. Stahl led the company until selling his shares to Soref's children who took over the company management, later selling the company to the American Brands Corporation in 1970.

In 1974, Master Lock ran a Super Bowl ad demonstrating one of their locks withstanding a shot by a sharpshooter, thereby proving its durability and thus their slogan "Tough Under Fire". Master Lock continued running similar ads during future Super Bowls, spending almost their entire annual marketing budget on the single commercial. Later, Master would incorporate the image into a one-second-long blipvert commercial in 1998.

At its peak in the early 1990s, the company employed about 1,300 workers in the Milwaukee, Wisconsin area. In 1993, during the rapid globalization of manufacturing the company began moving much of its manufacturing to China. Motivated by the North American Free Trade Agreement (NAFTA), they later also moved some manufacturing to Mexico. Most of the jobs at its Milwaukee plant—over 1,000—were eliminated, although the company continued to perform some of its manufacturing at the plant using heavily automated manufacturing processes.

=== 21st century ===
In 2002, Master Lock released its Titanium Series of padlocks, the first major redesign in fifty years. The goal was to add design variety and aesthetic value to the utilitarian functionality of their locks. The lock mechanism has titanium reinforced steel, with a stainless steel body. A shroud covers parts of the stainless steel, allowing the locks to come in different colors. Master Lock requested that the designer locks be stocked in departments outside the hardware section of retailers. In 2003, the company acquired Illinois based American Lock and all their intellectual and material property.

In 2004, Master Lock acquired Dudley, Canadian lock manufacturer/brand.

In 2010, Master Lock began offering a password manager service called Master Lock Vault that includes a web site and associated software applications for use on various devices. In 2011, Fortune Brands spun off Master Lock as part of Fortune Brands Home & Security.

In January 2011, it was announced that about 36 jobs were being returned from China to the Milwaukee plant, which would increase the number of positions at the plant to 379. Most of the added jobs were for making combination locks, subassemblies and keys. It was reported that the company would also continue to contract with three Chinese factories and about twenty Chinese suppliers, and operate its maquiladora near the Arizona border, where Mexican workers perform non-automated labor-intensive work such as assembling made-in-Milwaukee components.

In February 2012, U.S. President Barack Obama visited the Master Lock headquarters in Milwaukee, Wisconsin and lauded the company's recent return of jobs from overseas locations. As of that time, it was reported that the company had returned about 100 jobs from overseas during the preceding two-year period. In 2012, Master Lock introduced a line of combination padlocks called the dialSpeed. The dialSpeed lock is battery-operated, has a lit face, and features multiple user-programmable combinations. It has a master unlocking code that can be accessed through the company web site. In 2014, Master Lock acquired SentrySafe for $117.5 million.

In May 2023, Master Lock announced its Milwaukee plant would be closing. They completed the closure in March 2024. In the process, they laid off over 300 employees.

== Locks ==
Master Locks are made for a variety of uses, including personal locking, vehicle locking, and others. New products in the 2000s moved beyond locks, such as industrial space cover sealing mechanisms. As of 2012, almost all of the company's locks are known to have serious security flaws, which allow for easy bypass through lock picking or bump keys or other forms of bypassing. This is because the locks mostly contain standard cylindrical pins, with no, or poorly made, serrated or spool driver pins.

Master Lock padlocks

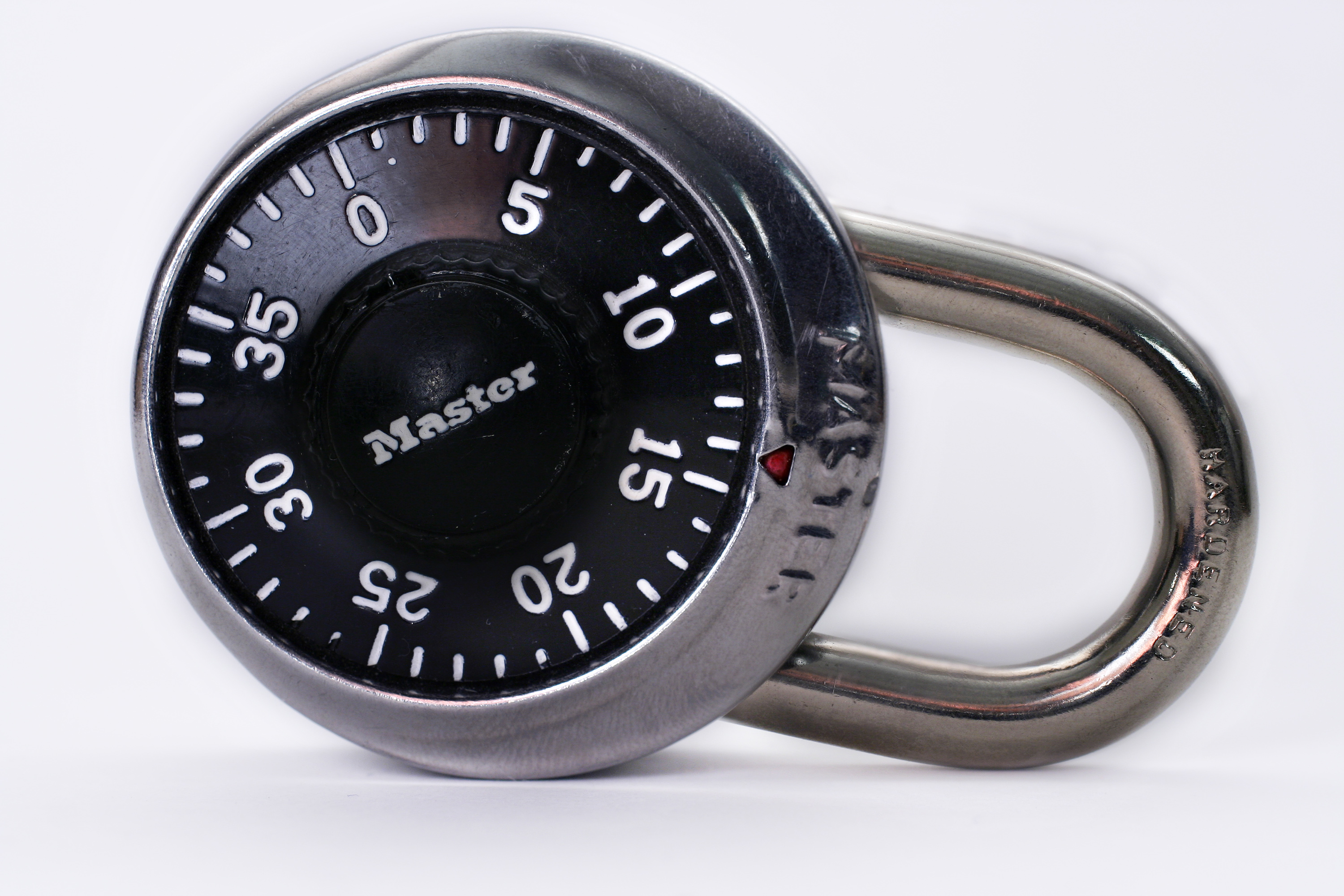
A Master combination padlock

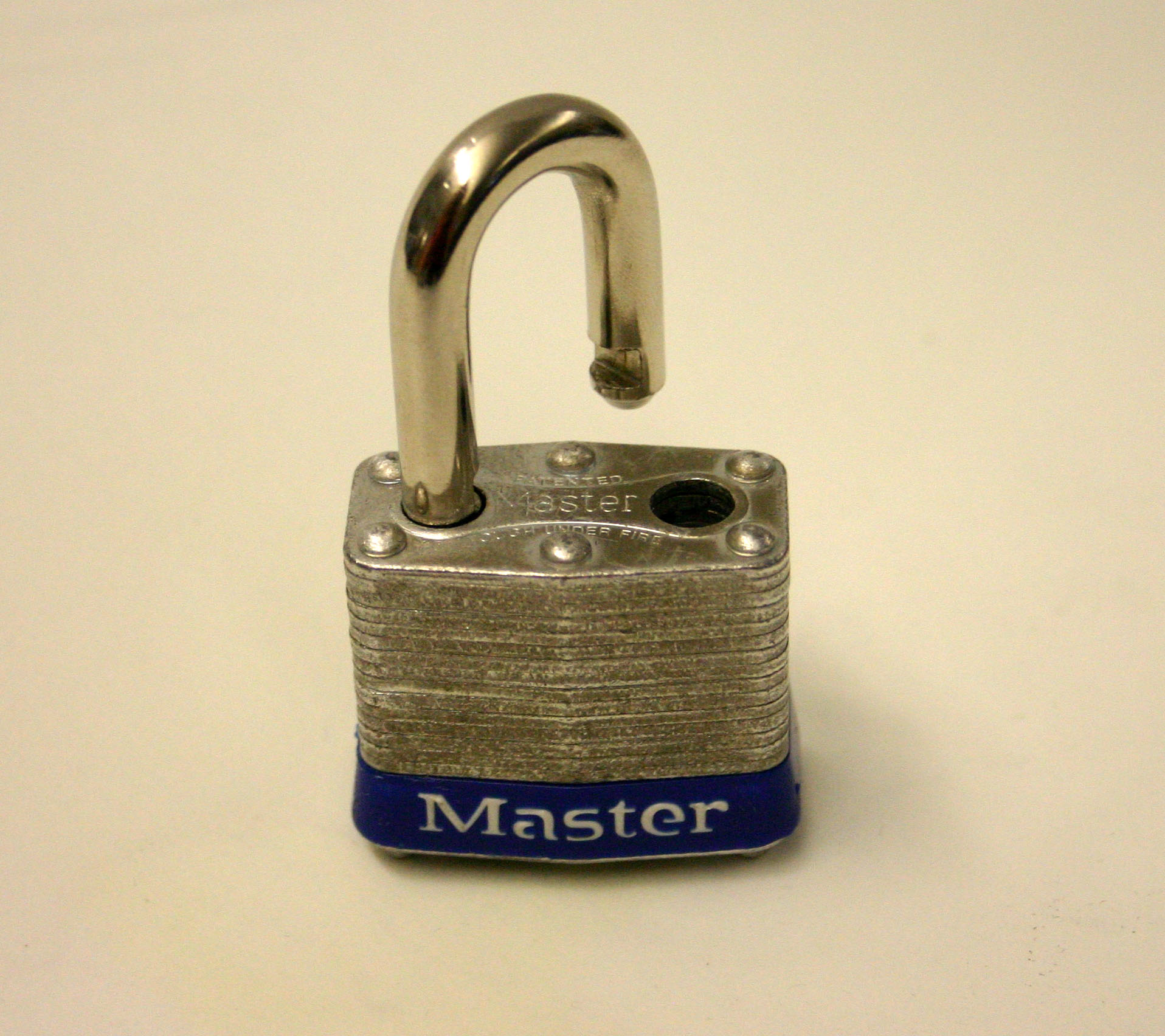
Master Lock with shackle open

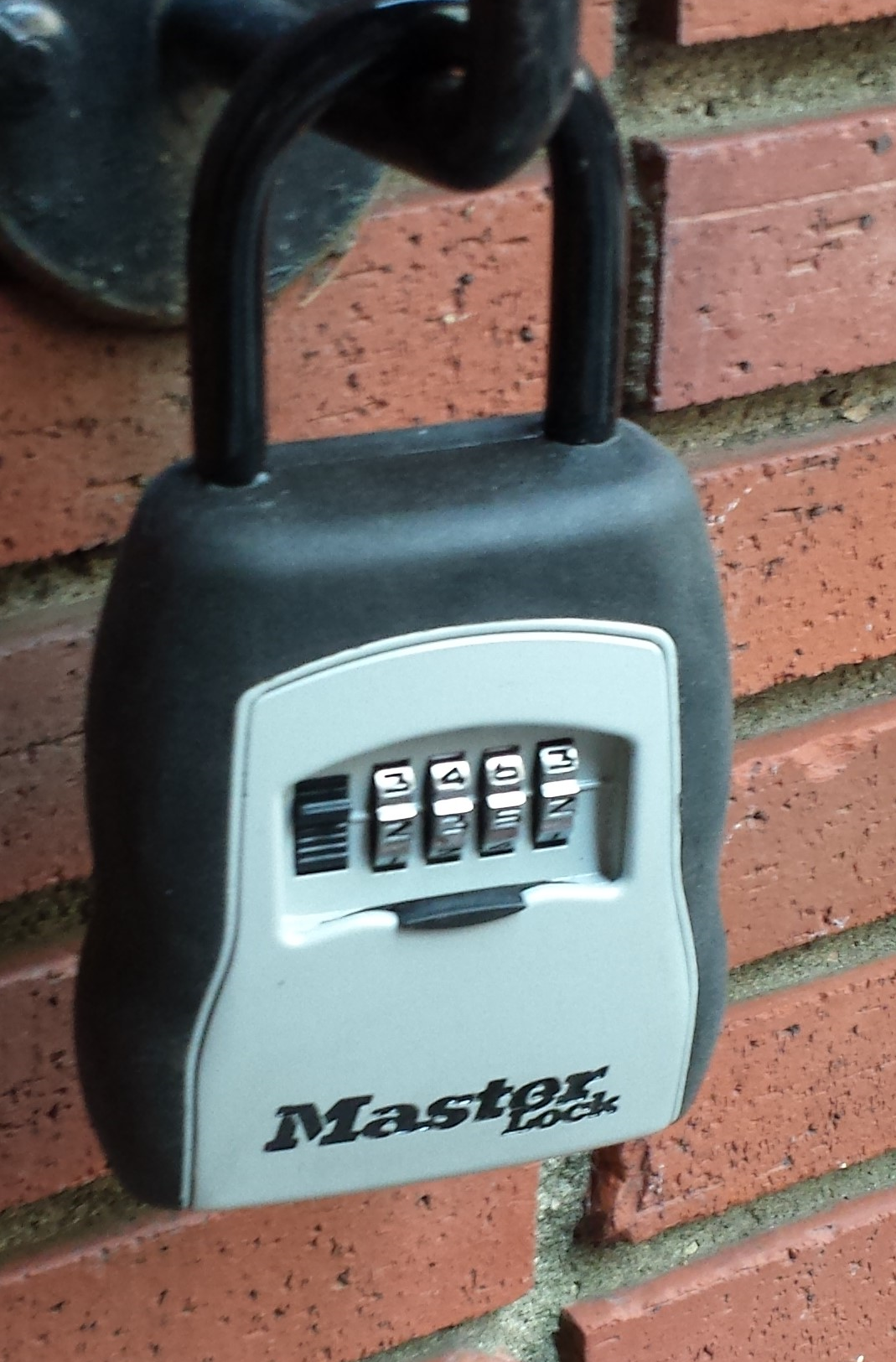
Master lockbox for key storage

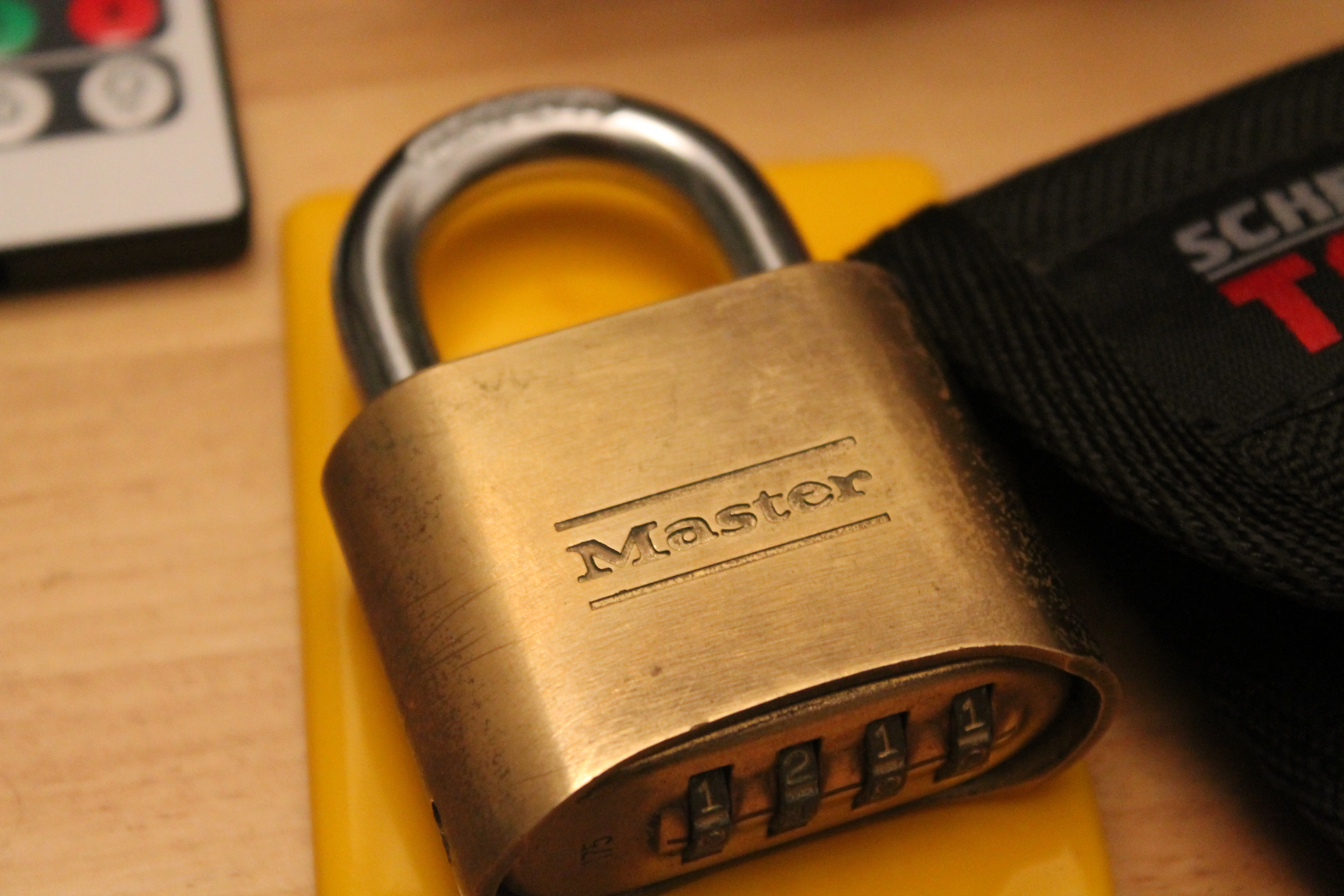
Master 175 combination lock

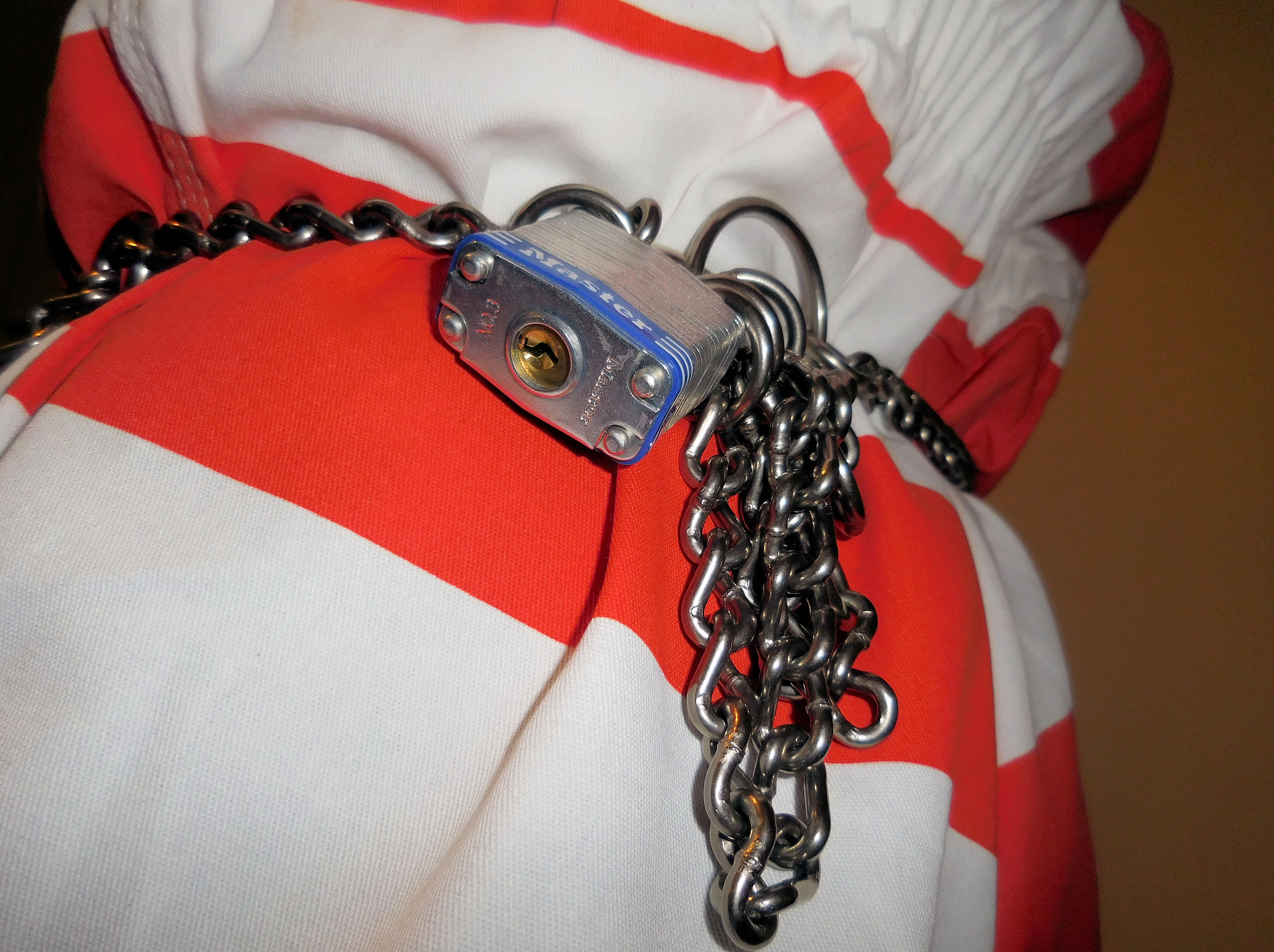
Master Lock securing a belly chain on an inmate
