= Moen Incorporated =

American plumbing fixtures company

- Type: Subsidiary
- Industry: Plumbing
- Founded: 1956; 70 years ago
- Headquarters: North Olmsted, Ohio, United States
- Key people: Rachel Roberts (president), Zoe Chiavarini (chairperson)
- Products: Faucets, bath/shower fixtures, garbage disposals, sinks
- Parent: Fortune Brands Innovations
- Website: moen.com

Previous logo. Still used on some Moen product packaging.

Moen is an American product line of faucets and other fixtures started by inventor Alfred M. Moen that is now part of the Fortune Brands Innovations company. The Moen subsidiary is headquartered in North Olmsted, Ohio. Moen was originally part of Ravenna Metal Products of Seattle, Washington.

== History ==
In 1956, it became part of Stanadyne, which was in turn acquired by Forstmann-Little & Company in 1988 and then purchased by the consumer-products holding company Fortune Brands. Fortune Brands then spun off its related product lines to form the Fortune Brands Home & Security company on October 3, 2011.

== Faucet design ==
Most Moen kitchen, washbasin, and bathtub/shower faucets are of the single-handle design, and almost all have used the same basic water-controlling cartridge from the 1960s until 2010. Known as the Moen 1225, it is a plastic (older versions were brass) cylinder approximately 4 inches long by 3/4 inches in diameter. As the "engine" in most Moen single-handle faucets, it has undergone at least two revisions since its inception though newer versions remain compatible with older faucets. Pulling up the stem of the cartridge opens the water supply; rotating toward the left opens the hot water passages while rotating to the right opens the cold water passages (using the standard North American convention of the hot water control on the left). Most Moen one-handle faucets produced since 2010 use the 1255 Duralast cartridge, which incorporates ceramic disc technology.

In the 1970s, Moen introduced the Moentrol bath and shower valve, a valve with a pressure balancing mechanism which compensates for sudden pressure changes in either the hot or cold water supply (as caused by a toilet being flushed while someone is showering). The design goal is to maintain the temperature of the shower for safety and comfort reasons, even if the volume of water is reduced. This was followed by the lower cost Posi‑Temp cycling valve in 1985, which uses the larger 1222 cartridge. The operation is similar to the 1225 (above), though the cartridge is approximately 1 inch in diameter to allow space for the pressure balancing mechanism. Unlike Moentrol, the Posi-Temp valve does not include a separate water volume control feature.

In 2020, Moen introduced the new M-CORE shower valve. This valve is designed to simplify installation for installers, particularly for multi-shower systems. The M-CORE uses the new 1213 cartridge. With the introduction of M-CORE, Moen will be retiring the Moentrol series of valves, however, valve trim for existing Moentrol valves will continue to be available. Like Moentrol, M-CORE includes a separate water volume control feature.

Some Moen products are manufactured in China.

== Internet of things ==
In 2017, Moen introduced the U by Moen Smart Shower system. The U by Moen Smart Shower system features an electronic wall controller and multi-zone thermostatic valve that can be adjusted by the controller itself, the Moen smartphone app, or voice-controlled via Amazon Alexa, Google Assistant, or Apple HomeKit. This was soon followed in 2020 by the U by Moen Smart Faucet, a kitchen faucet which can be controlled manually via the handle, a motion sensor, the Moen smartphone app, or voice-control, however, unlike the U by Moen Smart Shower, the U by Moen Smart Faucet does not support Apple HomeKit.

At the 2022 Consumer Electronics Show, the Moen Smart Faucet with motion control was named best product of the show by Review Geek. The faucet uses touchless gesture technology as well as voice commands to control the water flow and temperature.

== Other products ==
Besides faucets and bath fixtures, other products manufactured by Moen include bathroom accessories such as towel bars and rings, toilet paper roll holders, and shower curtain rods. Moen also manufactures garbage disposals under its Anaheim Manufacturing Company subsidiary mainly under the Moen, Waste King, and Whirlaway names, as well as under other brand names such as Frigidaire, Kenmore, and others. Moen also produces a line of faucets and bath fixtures for the multifamily market under the Cleveland Faucet Group (CFG) brand.

== Competitors ==
- American Standard Brands
- Delta Faucet Company
- Kohler Co.
- Pfister (firm)
- InSinkErator (for garbage disposals)
