= American Brands =

Defunct American holding company

Fortune Brands
- Industry: Conglomerate
- Predecessor: American Brands
- Founded: 1969; 57 years ago (as American Brands)
- Defunct: October 3, 2011
- Fate: Split
- Successor: FILA Korea, Fortune Brands Home & Security, Beam Inc.
- Headquarters: Deerfield, Illinois, U.S.
- Area served: Worldwide
- Key people: Bruce A. Carbonari (chairman of the board & CEO)
- Products: Moen; Master Lock; Jim Beam; DeKuyper; Knob Creek; Vox vodka El Tesoro tequila
- Revenue: ▼$ 6.695 billion (2009)
- Operating income: ▲$ 505.20 million (2009)
- Net income: ▼$ 242.80 million (2009)
- Total assets: ▲$ 12.370 billion (2009)
- Total equity: ▲$ 5.106 billion (2008)
- Number of employees: 24,248 (2009)

Fortune Brands was a holding company founded in 1969 as American Brands, renamed in 1997 and split apart in 2011. The corporate headquarters was in Deerfield, Illinois, in the United States. The company had diversified product lines. It announced on December 8, 2010, that it would focus on its liquor business, and spin off or sell other parts of the company including home furnishings, hardware and golf products. The company sold its Titleist and FootJoy product lines to the South Korean sportswear corporation, Fila. On October 3, 2011, it split the remainder of its business into two publicly traded companies: Fortune Brands Home & Security and Beam Inc. On January 13, 2014, Suntory (headquartered in Osaka, Japan) announced it would buy Beam Inc. for about $13.6 billion. The acquisition was completed on April 30, 2014, for about $16 billion and Beam became a subsidiary of Suntory named Beam Suntory, Suntory Global Spirits since 2024 .

== History ==
The American Tobacco Company was founded in 1890. In the late 1960s, with health concerns seen as posing an increasing threat to the tobacco business, management decided to diversify into other fields and changed the corporate name to American Brands, Inc. Brown & Williamson acquired the tobacco division in 1994.

== Former divisions ==
=== Tobacco ===
American Tobacco Company was the original division of American Brands. American Tobacco was sold to British American Tobacco in 1994.

=== Insurance ===
American Brands acquired Franklin Life Insurance in 1979. It sold the company to American General in 1994.

=== ACCO ===
In 1987 American Brands acquired ACCO, a holding company which owned several office supply subsidiaries. Stapler manufacturer Swingline, Inc., which American Brands had acquired in 1970, was combined with ACCO. In 2005, the company spun off ACCO to shareholders, and immediately thereafter ACCO merged with General Binding Corporation. This merged company is now known as ACCO Brands.

=== Golf ===
The Acushnet Company, purchased in 1976, became American Brands' golf division. It produced golf balls, shoes, and clubs under the Pinnacle Golf, Titleist, FootJoy and Cobra Golf trademarks. The Acushnet Rubber division, which was Acushnet's original business, was sold off in 1985. Cobra Golf was sold to Puma AG in March 2010, and the other golf brands were sold to Fila in 2011.

=== Home and hardware ===
The home and hardware division reached annual sales of over $4 billion, from Waterloo Industries, Moen faucets, Fypon, Therma-Tru doors, Simonton windows, Master Lock, American Lock, and Vista Window Company, Western Division. Many of these operations passed to Fortune Brands Home & Security when the company was split.

=== Spirits ===
Fortune Brands had a stable of well known spirits brands, led by Jim Beam, which it had purchased in 1968.

In July 2005, Fortune Brands and French spirits company Pernod Ricard acquired over 25 additional spirits and wine brands from British holding company Allied Domecq. In November 2007, Constellation Brands announced a purchase of Fortune Brands' wine operations for $885 million USD, a transaction that added 1,500 acres (6.1 km^{2}) of vineyards, several major brands such as Clos du Bois, and 2.6 million cases per year of "super-premium" class wine production.

After the other product lines were sold and spun off, the remaining spirits business became Beam Inc.
