= Fortune Brands Innovations =

Home Security Manufacturer

Fortune Brands Innovations, Inc.
- Formerly: Fortune Brands Home & Security, Inc.
- Type: Public
- Traded as: NYSE: FBIN; S&P 400 component
- Founded: 2011; 15 years ago
- Headquarters: Deerfield, Illinois, U.S.
- Key people: Jesse G. Singh, CEO
- Products: Home & Security
- Revenue: US$7.7 billion (2021)
- Net income: US$1.1 billion (2021)
- Total assets: US$7.9 billion (2021)
- Total equity: US$3.1 billion (2021)
- Number of employees: 28,000 (2021)
- Subsidiaries: Moen Incorporated; House of Rohl; Therma-Tru; Larson; Fiberon; Master Lock; Sentry Group; MasterBrand Cabinets
- Website: fbin.com

Fortune Brands Innovations, Inc. (or "Fortune Brands") is an American manufacturer of home and security products, headquartered in Deerfield, Illinois. Its portfolio of businesses and brands includes Moen and the House of Rohl; outdoor living and security products from Therma-Tru, Larson, Fiberon, Master Lock and SentrySafe; and MasterBrand Cabinets. Fortune Brands is a Fortune 500 company and part of the S&P 400 Index. As of December 31, 2021, the company reported employing approximately 28,000 associates and posted full-year 2021 net sales of $7.7 billion.

== History ==
Fortune Brands Home & Security, Inc. began trading on the New York Stock Exchange under the ticker symbol FBHS on October 3, 2011. Prior to its spin-off, the company operated as a division of the former Fortune Brands, Inc. holding company. Following the separation, Fortune Brands, Inc. changed its name to Beam Inc. and retained no ownership interest in Fortune Brands Home & Security, Inc.

In August 2022, Fortune Brands acquired Aqualisa Holdings, a shower products manufacturer, for $160 million.

In March 2026, the company announced it would restart its search for a new chief executive and rescind its appointment of Amit Banati, who had planned to assume the role in May.

== Business segments ==
As of April 28, 2022, Fortune Brands has three reporting segments: Water Innovations, Outdoors & Security, and Cabinets.

=== Water Innovations ===
Fortune Brands' Water Innovations segment (formerly the Global Plumbing Group) is headquartered in North Olmsted, Ohio. The segment manufactures or assembles and sells faucets, accessories, kitchen sinks and waste disposals, predominantly under the Moen and House of Rohl brands, which includes luxury branded plumbing products from Riobel, Perrin & Rowe, Victoria + Albert and Shaws. In addition to offering faucets, showers, tubs, sinks and accessories, the Moen brand is expanding its home whole water management and digital offerings with the Moen Smart Water Network.

=== Outdoors & Security ===
Fortune Brands' Outdoors & Security segment is headquartered in Maumee, Ohio. Formerly operating under "Doors & Security", its name was changed to Outdoors & Security in November 2020 preceding the acquisition of Larson in December 2020. The Outdoors & Security segment manufactures and sells fiberglass and steel entry door systems under the Therma-Tru brand name, storm, screen and security doors under the Larson brand name, composite decking and railing under the Fiberon brand name, and urethane millwork under the Fypon brand name. Fortune Brands acquired Solar Innovations in January 2022 to support the segment’s outdoor living strategy. The Outdoors & Security segment also manufactures, sources and distributes locks, safety and security devices, and electronic security products under the Master Lock and American Lock brands and fire resistant safes, security containers and commercial cabinets under the SentrySafe brand.

=== Cabinets ===
Fortune Brands' previously had a Cabinets segment that was headquartered in Jasper, Indiana. MasterBrand Cabinets manufacturers and sells stock and semi-custom and custom cabinetry, as well as vanities for the kitchen, bath and other parts of the home. Brands within the MasterBrand Cabinets portfolio include Omega, Decora, Diamond, Aristokraft, Urbana, Mantra, and more. In April of 2022 Fortune Brands announced its intent to separate into two separate publicly traded companies via a tax-free spin-off of the Cabinets business.

== Mergers, acquisitions and divestitures ==
Fortune Brands Home & Security, Inc. spun-off from Fortune Brands, Inc. on October 3, 2011, and began trading as a separate company on the NYSE. Below is the timeline of mergers, acquisitions and divestitures from the time of the spin-off:

- June 2013: Acquired WoodCrafters
- July 2014: Acquired SentrySafe
- September 2014: Sold Simonton Windows
- May 2015: Acquired Norcraft Companies
- September 2015: Sold Waterloo tool storage
- May 2016: Acquired Riobel
- September 2016: Acquired Rohl and Perrin & Rowe
- July 2017: Acquired Shaws of England
- October 2017: Acquired Victoria + Albert
- August 2018: Acquired Fiberon
- December 2020: Acquired Larson
- January 2022: Acquired Solar Innovations
- July 2022: Acquired Aqualisa Products Limited
- December 2022: Spun-off MasterBrand, Inc.
- July 2023: Acquired the US and Canadian part of the Yale home lock business from Assa Abloy

== Financial performance ==
Fortune Brands' business strategy includes investing in its current brands and businesses to build on its brands' leading market positions and develop innovative products that promote growth, leverage its global supply chains to be more flexible and improve quality, costs and efficiencies and generating incremental shareholder value by deploying capital for strategic mergers & acquisitions, share repurchases and dividends.

As of the end of 2021, Fortune Brands increased its annual sales every year since its first full year as an independently traded company.

== Leadership ==
Nicholas I. Fink is chief executive officer of Fortune Brands and is on its board of directors. He assumed the CEO role on January 6, 2020, after having served as chief operating officer of Fortune Brands, and prior to that, the president of the Fortune Brands Global Plumbing Group (now known as Water innovations). Fink succeeded Christopher J. Klein, who had held the chief executive officer role at Fortune Brands from 2011 through his retirement from CEO on December 31, 2019.

Patrick D. Hallinan is chief financial officer of Fortune Brands. He assumed the CFO role on July 1, 2017. Hallinan succeeded E. Lee Wyatt, who had held the chief financial officer role at Fortune Brands from 2011 through June 30, 2017. Wyatt retired from Fortune Brands at the end of 2017.

== Board of directors ==
Susan Saltzbart Kilsby is the independent, non-executive chair of Fortune Brands' Board of Directors. Kilsby spent most of her career at Credit Suisse AG, holding a variety of senior positions including managing director and head of mergers and acquisitions for Europe, the Middle East and Africa from 2009 until her retirement in May 2014.

She first joined Fortune Brands' board on July 28, 2015. On January 1, 2020, she became non-executive chair of the Board of Directors, succeeding Christopher J. Klein, who had held the executive board chair position from January 1, 2020, to December 31, 2020. Prior to Klein, David M. Thomas served as chair of the board from 2011 to December 31, 2019.

All members of the board, except for Fink, are independent under the New York Stock Exchange rules.
