= Knob Creek (bourbon) =

American brand of bourbon whiskey

Knob Creek Straight Bourbon whiskey
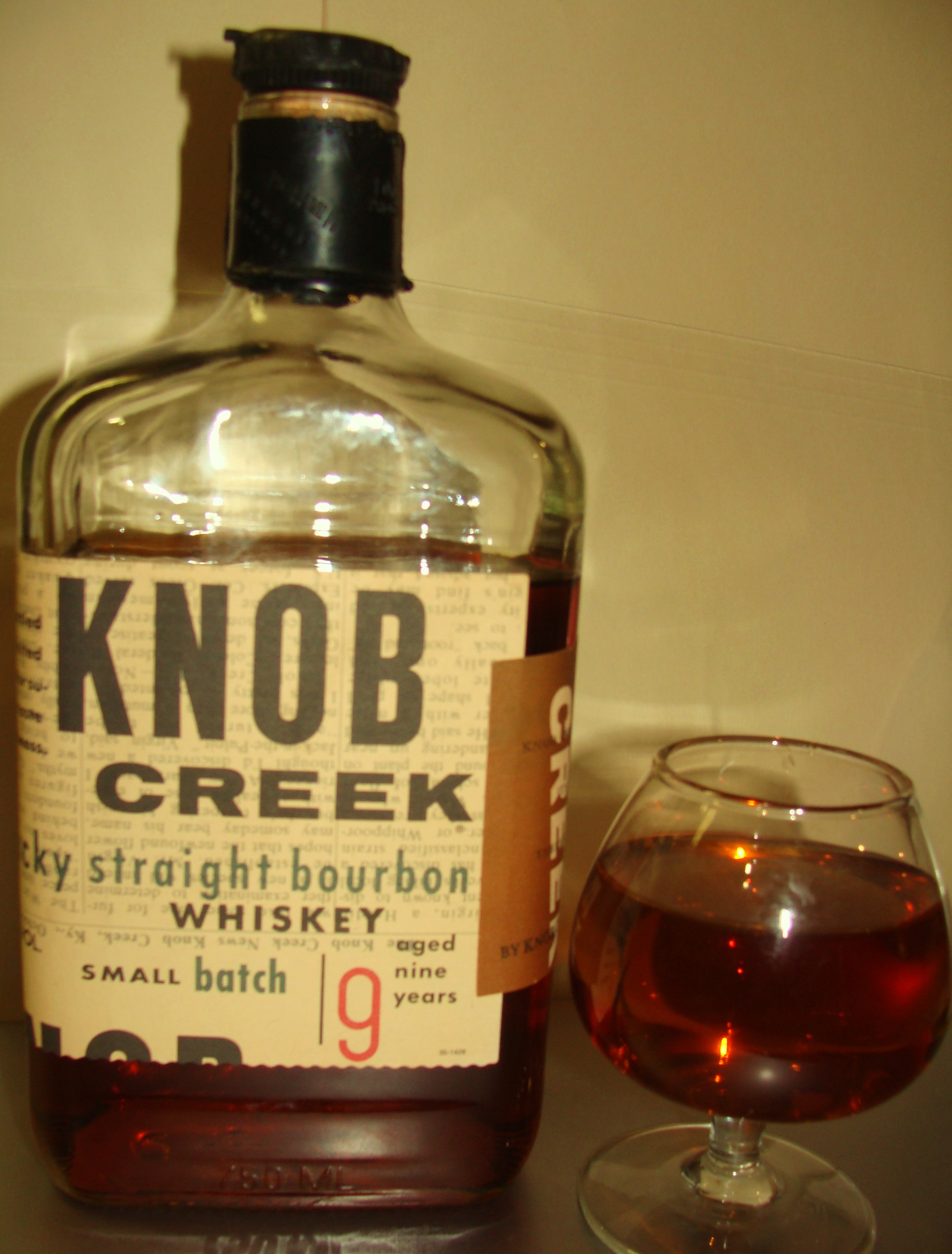
- Knob Creek
- Type: Bourbon whiskey
- Manufacturer: Suntory Global Spirits
- Origin: United States (Kentucky)
- Introduced: 1992
- Alcohol by volume: 50.00%
- Proof (US): 100
- Related products: Jim Beam
- Website: www.knobcreek.com

Knob Creek is an American brand of Kentucky straight bourbon whiskey produced by Suntory Global Spirits (a subsidiary of Suntory Holdings of Osaka, Japan) at the Jim Beam distillery in Clermont, Kentucky. It is one of the four Jim Beam small batch bourbon brands targeted for the high-end liquor market. Its siblings in the line are Booker's, Baker's, and Basil Hayden's.

The primary expression of the brand is aged for 9 years and bottled at 100 proof (higher than the typical 2 years and 80 proof that are the minimums required by U.S. Federal labeling requirements). Knob Creek comes in a rectangular bottle with a corked or twist-on cap and wax-sealed top. The bourbon has a dark, amber-brown color.

== History ==
The first Knob Creek bourbon was introduced in 1992, named after nearby Knob Creek Farm. It shares the same general formulation as Jim Beam, but is aged and packaged differently.

In 2009, Beam ran a campaign to publicize their shortage of Knob Creek bourbon. Demand exceeded the 2000 forecast, when the stock began the aging process.

Knob Creek was aged for nine years until late 2016, when Beam Suntory removed the age statement from the label due to tight inventory that could not be guaranteed to be aged the full nine years. In mid 2019 Beam Suntory announced the age statement would return to bottle labels sometime in 2020.

== Varieties ==
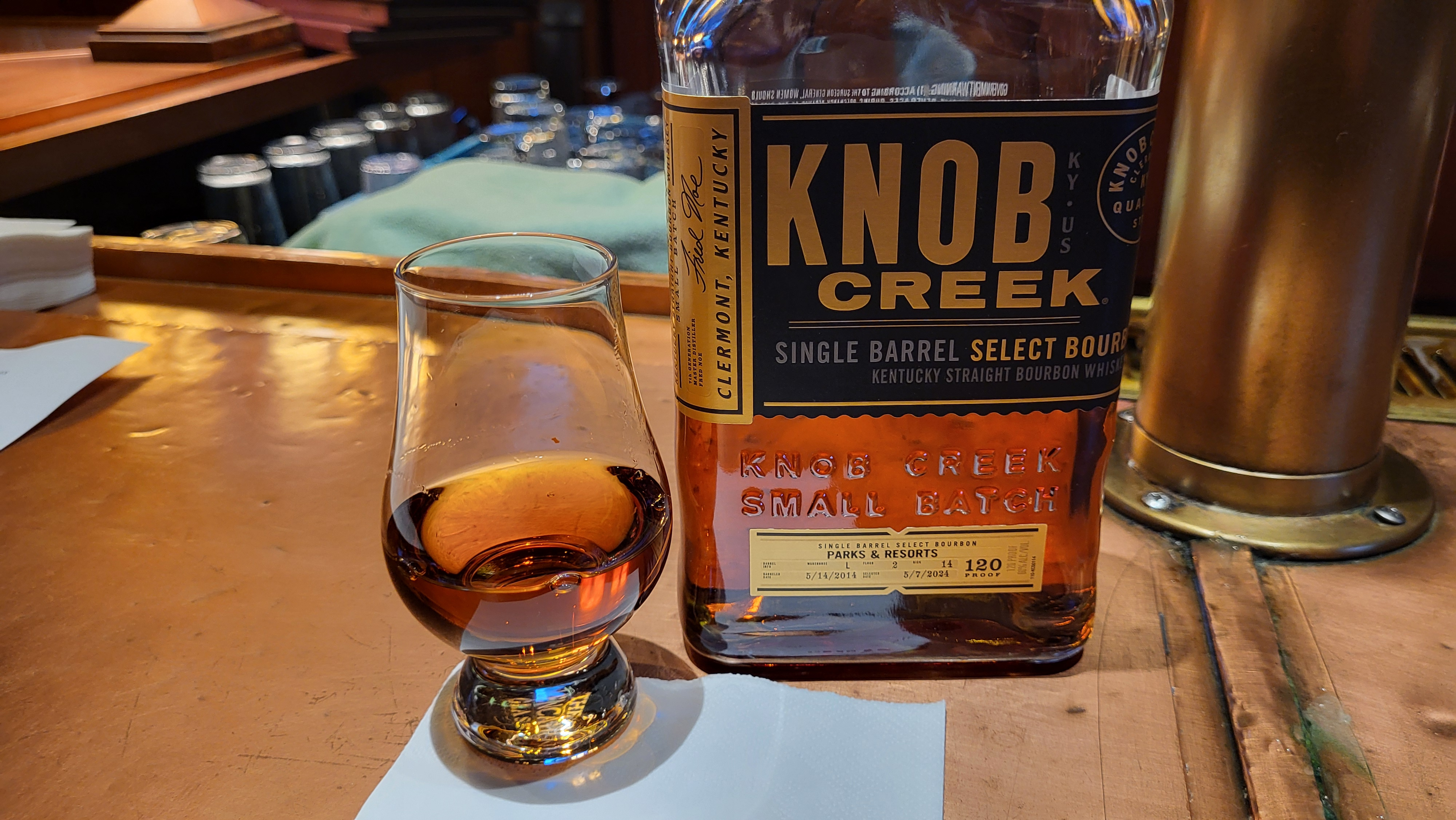
Bourbon barrels for Knob Creek Single Barrel Select are hand-selected by individual retailers, such as the Walt Disney Company for the hotel bars it owns within Walt Disney World (pictured).

- Original 100 proof (50% ABV), aged 9 years.
- Knob Creek Single Barrel Reserve: a 120 proof (60% ABV) single barrel bourbon, aged 9 years.
- Knob Creek Single Barrel Select: a 120 proof (60% ABV) single barrel bourbon, part of Jim Beam's private barrel pick program for retailers.
- Knob Creek Rye: a 100 proof (50% ABV) straight rye whiskey bearing the Knob Creek name was released in 2012. This is the first Knob Creek whiskey not to carry an age statement, instead being advertised only as "Patiently Aged".
- Knob Creek Smoked Maple Bourbon: Introduced in 2013. It is bottled at 90 proof (45% ABV), and is the company's first flavored bourbon liqueur.
- Knob Creek 2001 Limited Edition: Introduced in 2016, this was a one-time release that marks the passing of the production process from Booker Noe to his son Fred. This release was made from barrels that Booker stored in 2001 and were finished by son Fred. There were four different batches released in 2016, retailing at around $130 per bottle. Bottles were 100 proof and aged for 14 years, which is 5 years longer than the Original 100 and Knob Creek Single Barrel.
- Knob Creek 21 Year Old: Introduced in 2025, the 100 proof bourbon is the company's oldest expression to date.

== Reviews ==
Knob Creek bourbon has won a number of accolades from Spirit ratings organizations.

- The San Francisco World Spirits Competitions gave it two double gold, three golds, one silver, and one bronze medal between 2005 and 2012, and gave it a "Best Bourbon" award in 2015.
- Wine Enthusiast Magazine rated it in its 90–95 point interval in 2005.
- The Beverage Testing Institute rated it twice, giving it 90 points on one occasion and 91 points on another.

Food critic Morgan Murphy said "Aged 9 years, this whiskey stands as one of the first premium, small-batch bourbons."
