= 2016 Jim Beam strike =

American labor action

- Date: October 15–21, 2016 (6 days)
- Location: United States: Boston, Kentucky; Clermont, Kentucky
- Caused by: Disagreements over a new labor contract
- Goals: Hiring of more permanent workers; Hiring of additional full-time workers
- Methods: Picketing; Strike action; Walkout
- Result: Strike ends in terms viewed favorably by union members.: Cap on temporary workers at 25 percent of the workforce; End of the two-tier wage system for union members; Reduction in number of temporary workers; Reduced hours

Parties
United Food and Commercial Workers Local 111D	Beam Suntory

The 2016 Jim Beam strike was a labor strike involving about 250 workers for the Beam Suntory subsidiary of the Japanese alcohol company Suntory, which produces the Jim Beam brand of bourbon whiskey in the U.S. state of Kentucky. These workers, all union members of the United Food and Commercial Workers Local 111D, worked at two distillery facilities in Clermont and Boston, Kentucky. In 2016, this local union began to negotiate the terms of a new labor contract with the company, and although a tentative agreement had been reached by October 11, it was voted down by a ratio of about ten-to-one by the union members, who also authorized strike action. The primary concerns of the members involved included, among other issues, job security, scheduling, overtime, and the hiring of temporary workers in lieu of permanent, full-time employees. The contract negotiations came during a major boom period in bourbon production, and some workers at the distilleries reported having to work about 70 hours per week. Additionally, the number of temporary workers had increased drastically, and union members were seeking to have this number reduced and for the company to hire more permanent employees. While an updated contract proposal was voted on on October 14, it was similarly rejected by the union members, and with no replacement contract in place as the existing contract expired at midnight, the strike began the next day.

The strike continued for approximately one week, during which time the company instituted a contingency plan that allowed the distilleries to remain in operation. On October 16, union and company officials met for the first time since the strike began and in the following days resumed negotiations. Negotiations with a federal mediator present resumed on October 18, and by October 20, a tentative agreement had been reached. The following day, union members voted 204–19 to accept the contract and end the strike. Among the provisions of the contract were the elimination of a pay difference between union members, a cap on temporary workers at 25 percent of the total workforce, and a commitment to hire at least 27 full-time employees. Within two weeks of the strike's conclusion, the company had already hired seven full-time employees and had ended mandatory overtime. In general, union members viewed the strike as successful.

== Background ==
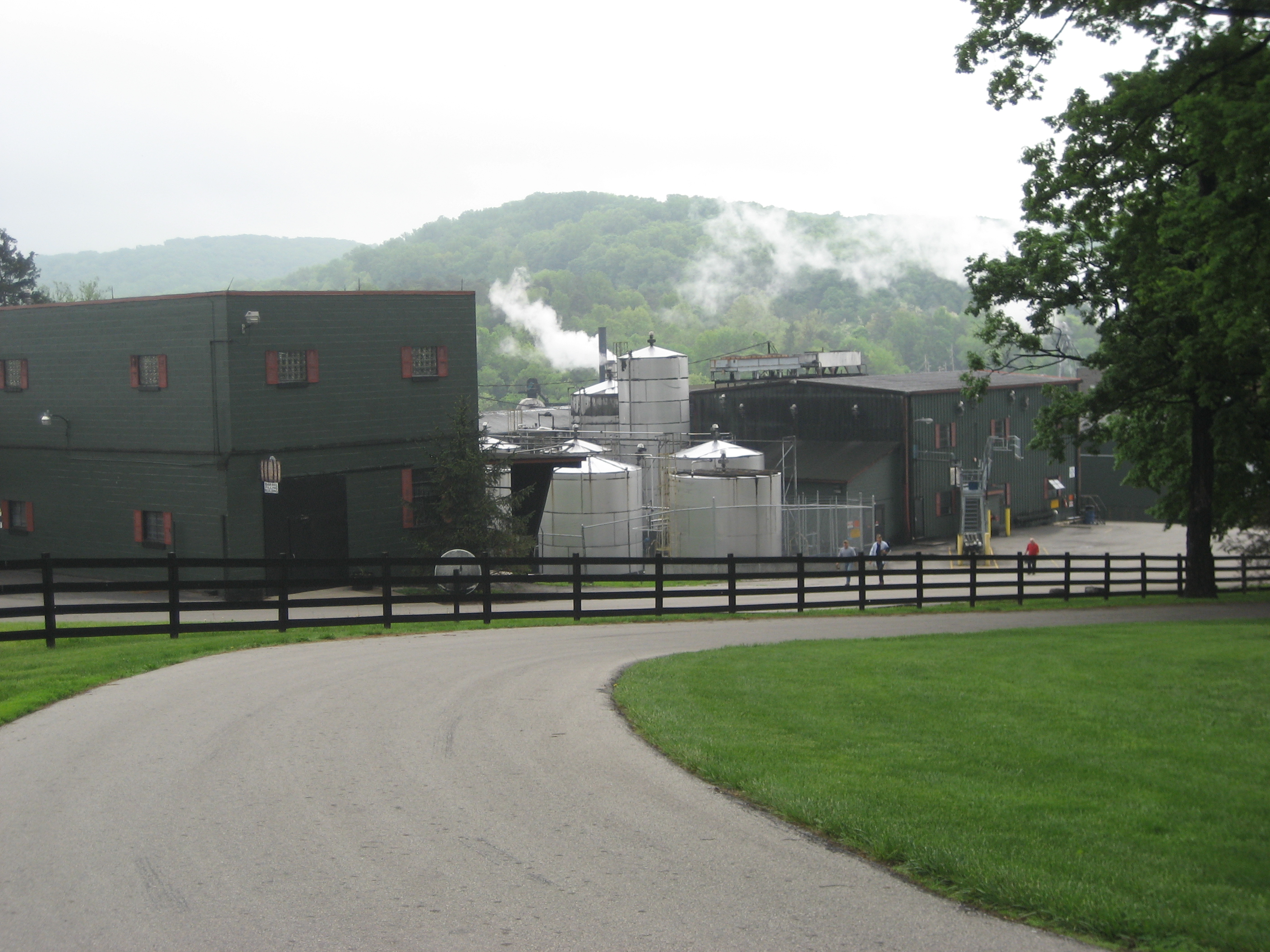
Distillery operated by Jim Beam, 2008

The U.S. state of Kentucky is known as the "distilling capital of the world" and has historically been a center for bourbon whiskey production. In the 2010s, the state was responsible for about 95 percent of worldwide bourbon production, and during this time the industry experienced a significant period of growth fueled primarily from investments from large alcohol companies such as Diageo and Heaven Hill. In 2015, bourbon production would reach a 50-year high, and the state's bourbon industry as a whole was valued at roughly US$3 billion. In 2014, the Japanese alcohol company Suntory purchased the company that produced the Jim Beam brand of bourbon for $16 billion. They formed a subsidiary called Beam Suntory, which operated several distillery facilities in Kentucky and was the largest producer of bourbon in the world. Going into late 2016, the company began to negotiate a new labor contract between itself and several hundred unionized workers at their facilities in Clermont and Boston, Kentucky, (Note: One source refers to the Clermont facility as the Jim Beam Distillery and the Boston facility as the Booker Noe Distillery.) who were members of the United Food and Commercial Workers (UFCW) Local 111D. Union representatives had been talking with company managers about a replacement contract since April, and while the existing contract was set to expire in August, the contract was extended while the two parties began to negotiate.

On October 11, after 33 days of negotiations over the terms of a new contract (which included the participation of a federal mediator), a proposed agreement was submitted for a vote by rank-and-file union members. However, the two-year proposal failed to pass in a vote of 201–19, which also served as an authorization for strike action. As the existing contract was valid until October 14, operations continued as normal at the plants for the next few days. Company representatives expressed confusion at the vote, stating that they did not understand why the offer was rejected and touting benefits from the proposal, which, according to the company, included wage increases and the "elimination of the two-tiered wage system for almost all employees". The company also stated that while they were unaware of any specific objections from union members, they were willing to work with union officials "to help ensure a full understanding of the proposal by the union membership". Several days after the vote, a union official stated that points of contention included vague contract language, job security, seniority, and scheduling. While pay was generally seen as good (average union members earned $23 per hour, while new employees and temporary workers earned $17.22 and $11, respectively), UFCW Local 111D President Janelle Mudd stated that some workers at the facilities were regularly working 70 hours per week and that the union wanted the company to hire more full-time employees instead of temporary workers. During the 2010s, the number of temporary workers at Jim Beam had approximately doubled, with the company hiring between 120 and 140 temporary workers during that time. Mudd further stated that the scheduling was negatively affecting the union members' work–life balance and that the union was seeking "a return to the family values and heritage upon which the Jim Beam brand is based".

Speaking to the New York Post, food writer Fred Minnick stated that the workers were increasing their leverage by threatening a strike at that time as opposed to during the middle of the year when production slows down. Additionally, he stated that, while a short-term strike probably would not have a significant effect on product availability, a strike lasting several weeks or a month could cause shortages in Jim Beam products. On October 14, an updated contract proposal was presented by the company, but in another round of voting, workers rejected it in a vote of 174–46. A UFCW official declined to say the changes that had been made to the proposal, though the company later stated that the revised proposal included concessions regarding overtime, increased wages, and the use of temporary workers. An article in Labor Notes states that this contract would have increased wages for about 50 of the lower-paid employees by up to 35 percent, but a Local 111D member interviewed by the magazine claimed that only about five of those workers voted in favor of the deal. With the second rejection, the workers were scheduled to go on strike at midnight, though a company official stated that they were willing to meet with union representatives before the contract expired. The strike would be the first in Jim Beam's history.

== Course of the strike ==
With no replacement contract in place, the strike commenced after midnight on the morning of October 15, with picketing beginning shortly thereafter. The walkout involved about 252 employees at the Boston and Clermont facilities, though the company's facility in Frankfort and their Maker's Mark facility in Loretto, Kentucky, were unaffected. A spokesperson for the company stated that, as a result of the strike, the company would be implementing a contingency plan, though they did not state whether or not that plan included hiring nonunion labor. As a result, the distilleries operated throughout the duration of the strike. President Mudd stated that the union and company would have an informal meeting on October 16, but they did not expect any new contract proposals to be made at that time. Following the meeting, which the company called a "constructive session", negotiations with a federal mediator were expected to recommence on October 18. On October 20, the union announced that a new tentative agreement had been reached with the company, with the details to be revealed later that day and a vote to be held the following day. The next day, union members ratified the new contract, and as this vote occurred on a Friday, the employees would return to work the following Monday.

The contract was accepted in a landslide vote of 204–19. Local 111D members, speaking to In These Times, stated that the new two-year contract included a cap on the number of temporary workers hired by the company and a commitment from management to hire more full-time workers. Specifically, temporary workers would be capped at 25 percent of the workforce, there would no longer be a two-tier wage system for full-time employees, and the company would hire at least 27 full-time employees. Additionally, Mudd stated that the contract addressed equal pay for equal work and that, while the union had wanted to avoid a strike in the first place, the labor dispute was a general success for the union members. Officials from both the union and company stated that the resolution to the strike was due in large part to good faith discussions and bargaining between the two. Within two weeks of the end of the strike, Jim Beam had already hired seven new full-time employees and had ended mandatory overtime.

== See also ==
- 2021 Heaven Hill strike
