= Basil Hayden's =

American bourbon whiskey produced by Beam Suntory

- Type: Bourbon whiskey
- Manufacturer: Suntory Global Spirits
- Origin: Kentucky, United States
- Introduced: 1992
- Alcohol by volume: 40.00%
- Proof (US): 80
- Related products: Jim Beam
- Website: basilhaydens.com

Basil Hayden's is the lightest-bodied bourbon whiskey in the family of Jim Beam small batch bourbons produced by Suntory Global Spirits (a subsidiary of Suntory Holdings of Osaka, Japan). It is 80 proof, in contrast with its three sibling brands of greater alcohol concentration (Knob Creek, Booker's, and Baker's).

The Basil Hayden's bourbon brand was introduced in 1992 and is named in honor of Basil Hayden Sr. Hayden was a distiller, and he used a larger amount of rye in his mash than in some other bourbons. Later, Hayden's grandson Raymond B. Hayden founded a distillery in Nelson County and named his label "Old Grand-Dad", in honor of his grandfather, which bears a rendering of Basil Sr.'s likeness. When Beam Industries introduced its "small batch collection" of bourbon brands, among the four was Basil Hayden's. The company says it uses a mash identical to Knob Creek, which is similar to that originally utilized by Hayden in 1792.

The brand expression was originally labeled as "Aged 8 Years", but in 2014, the age statement was replaced by "Artfully Aged", indicating that the brand no longer carries an age guarantee.

== Reviews ==
Food critic Morgan Murphy said, "The rye-heavy whiskey is aged 8 years and carries a buttery flavor and smooth, tannic finish."
