= Tunnel Mill =

Tunnel Mill can refer to:

- Tunnel Mill (Spring Valley, Minnesota), listed on the NRHP in Minnesota
- John Work House and Mill Site, near Charlestown, Indiana
