= Old Grand-Dad =

Brand of bourbon whiskey distilled at the Jim Beam Plant in Clermont, KY

- Type: Bourbon whiskey
- Manufacturer: Suntory Global Spirits
- Origin: Kentucky, United States
- Introduced: 1840
- Alcohol by volume: 40%, 43%, 50%, 57%
- Proof (US): 80, 86, 100, 114
- Related products: Jim Beam, Old Overholt

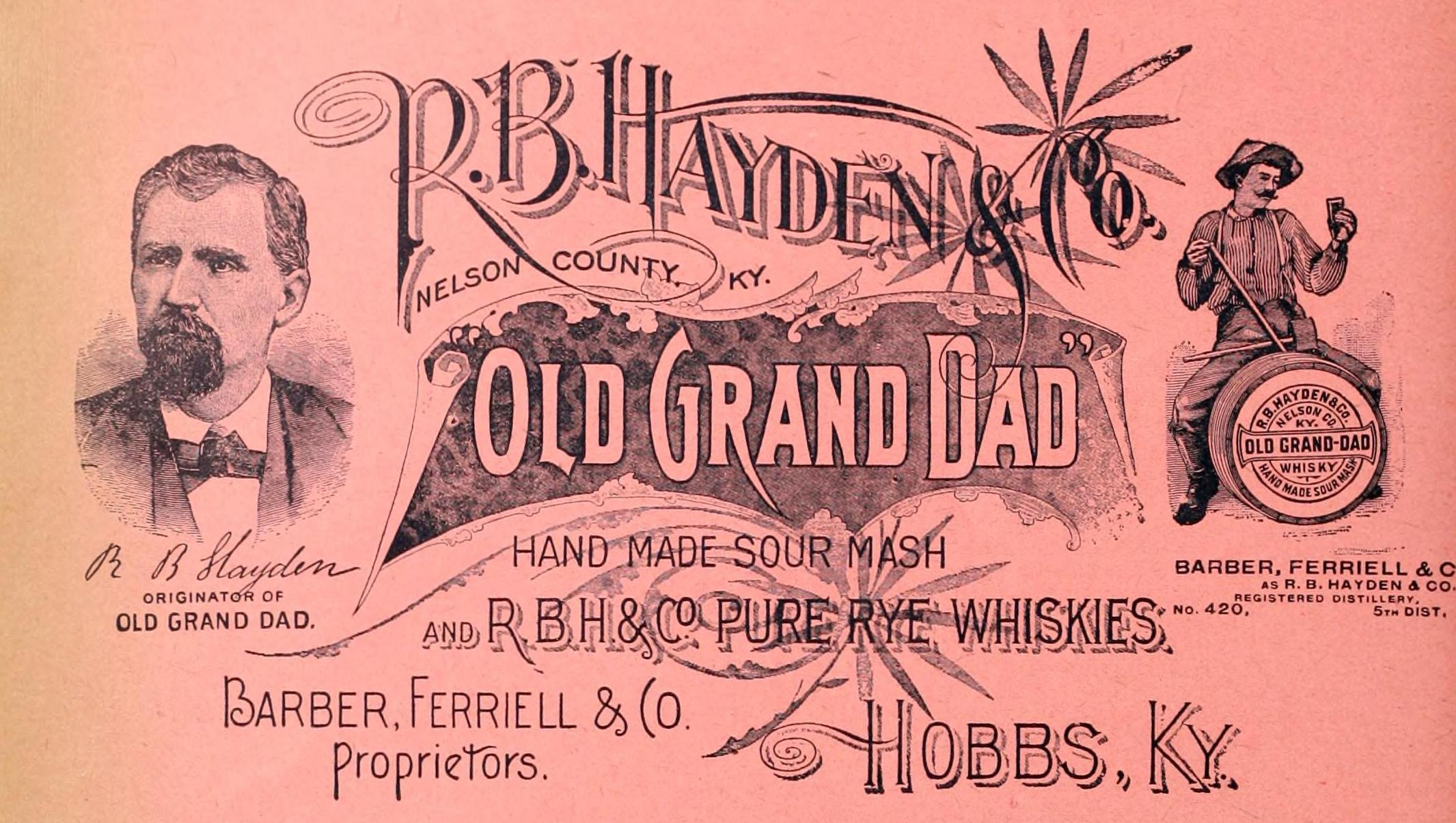
1894 ad

Old Grand-Dad is a brand of bourbon whiskey distilled at the Jim Beam distillery in Clermont, Kentucky. The brand was created by Raymond B. Hayden and named after his grandfather Basil Hayden Sr., who was a well known distiller during his lifetime. A fanciful portrait of Hayden Sr. is depicted on the front of each bottle. Today, it is owned and produced by Suntory Global Spirits.

As of December 2015, Old Grand-Dad and Old Overholt – both of which are Beam Suntory brands – are marketed together as "The Olds".

== History ==
The Hayden family's first commercial distillery was created in 1840, and the whiskey has been in production since that time despite several changes of ownership. After Raymond Hayden died in 1885, the distillery was purchased at auction by his former partner, Lem Ferriell, and Philetus Swift Barber. In 1899, Old Grand-Dad was purchased by the Wathen family, whose broad interests in the whiskey business later formed the American Medicinal Spirits Company and the foundations of National Distillers Group. During prohibition, the company produced "medicinal whiskey" for sick, blind, and lame patients. National Distillers had facilities in Cincinnati, Ohio, Frankfort, Kentucky and Louisville, KY., and also produced Old Crow, Old Overholt and Old Taylor. In 1987, National Distillers Group sold the spirits business to the Fortune Brands holding company, which became Beam Inc.

== Versions ==
Old Grand-Dad remains one of the USA's ten best-selling straight whiskeys. It comes in three different bottling proofs: 80 proof, 100 proof Bottled In Bond, and 114 Barrel Proof in a short-height bottle gift box package. In 2013 the lower proof offering went from 86 proof to 80 proof.

Since 1992 Beam has also marketed another brand of Kentucky bourbon, Basil Hayden's, named after the same person.

== Reviews ==
Food critic Morgan Murphy said "The sweet corn of this whiskey is hot on the lips but has a mild finish of vanilla and baking spices."

== References in media ==
- In Travels with Charley, John Steinbeck's 1961 account of a road-trip across America, he stocks Old Grand-Dad on his truck and regularly offers "a dollop" to people he meets.
- Old Grand-Dad is featured prominently in the opening scenes of the film Bad Santa and in the Nick Stefanos novels by George P. Pelecanos, as well as in John Hawkes's classic novel Second Skin.
- Former Pennsylvania State University football coach Joe Paterno's son suggested that his father enjoyed Old Grand-Dad on the rocks.
- The fictional character Morgan Kane, from the book series of the same name, always drank Old Grand-Dad if it was available and took a bottle or three with him most of the times he had to venture too far from a liquor store or a bar to his liking.
- George Thorogood references Old Grand-Dad whiskey in his song "I Drink Alone", in the lyrics "...the only one who will hang out with me is my dear Old Grand-Dad..."
- Australian producers Vanda & Young recorded an album titled "Tales of Old Grand-Dad" with future AC/DC guitarists Angus and Malcolm Young under the alias Marcus Hook Roll Band.
- Old Grand-Dad is cited in the Lynyrd Skynyrd song "Whiskey Rock-a-Roller" (from the 1975 album Nuthin' Fancy) saying, "She likes to drink Old Grand-Dad, and her shoes do shuffle around".
- Old Grand-Dad is specified by James Bond in the novel Live and Let Die for his Old Fashioned.
- It is also mentioned in the Hank Williams, Jr. song "Women I've Never Had": "I like sweet young things and Old Grand-Dad, and I like to have women I've never had".
- In Cormac McCarthy's Cities of the Plain novel, Old Grand-Dad is the drink of choice for many of the characters.
- In his book Truman, David G. McCullough writes extensively about President Harry S. Truman's love for bourbon, in which he was joined by his wife Bess. He further writes that the President's preferred drink was Old Grand-Dad on the rocks.
- In Raymond Chandler's 1953 novel, The Long Goodbye, the main protagonist, detective Philip Marlowe, offers Old Grand-Dad to his friend Terry Lennox after he arrives at Marlowe's apartment despondent and with a gun.
- In Robert P. Davis's 1976 novel The Pilot, Mike Hagen, the alcoholic airline pilot, keeps his (hidden) hip flask filled with Old Grand-Dad.
- The author Charles Bukowski frequently mentioned Old Grand-Dad in his stories. For example, in Post Office, the protagonist Chinaski buys Grandad for breakfast.
- In Hank Searls' 1978 novelization for the film, Jaws 2, one of the attack victims drinks coffee laced with Old Grand-Dad to calm his nerves before going scuba diving.
- Kolt "Racer" Raynor, the lead character of Dalton Fury's books Black Site and Tier One Wild, prefers Old Grand-Dad.
- In the Veronica Mars film, Cindy "Mac" Mackenzie insists that Veronica bring her a glass of Old Grand-Dad after being dragged to their ten-year high school reunion.
- On The Mary Tyler Moore Show, Lou offers Mary Old Grand-Dad at a party; Mary mistakenly assumes he's referring to her 68-year-old date.
- On the show Mad Men, Roger Sterling orders Freddie Rumsen a "Grand-Dad Rocks" while out for the evening with Donald Draper.
- On the show The Love Boat, Julie McCoy jokes with a passenger that he looks more like Old Grand-Dad, after he asked her if she would believe his name was Jack Daniels.
- On the show M*A*S*H, Hawkeye (Alan Alda) gives Klinger (Jamie Farr) a quart of "Old Grand-Dad" as his contribution to a potluck.
- On the show The Wayans Bros, When a woman is giving birth in the diner, Pops asks for Shawn to bring some hot water, towels and half a pint of "Old Grand-Dad".
- In the classic 1931 Warner Brothers talkie The Public Enemy, James Cagney and Edward Woods are seen smuggling crates of Old Grand-Dad bourbon, this while Prohibition was still in place. This is believed to be an early example of Product placement of liquor in sound film.
- During Season 3, Episode 6, of the television series Boardwalk Empire, the main character, Nucky Thompson, is arrested by Revenue Agents during Prohibition at Union Station in Washington, D.C., when he buys a pint of Old Grand-Dad from the newspaper seller for his ride back to Atlantic City on the train. This is the only incident during the series in which Nucky is arrested, charged with, and convicted with a crime, despite his long list of criminal exploits. Nucky mentions this during Season 5, Episode 1, when he says, "I won't lie, I have been arrested and convicted. In 1923 I bought a pint of Old Grand-Dad in Union Station in Washington, DC. I paid a $5 fine and I spent the night in jail. It's haunted me ever since."
- In the episode "The Mihn Who Knew Too Much," of the show King of the Hill, Hank references this drink when someone deposits their garbage in his trashcan, remarking "We don't use canned milk, or drink Old Grand-Dad."
- In the 1996 Canadian film, The Boys Club, the three boys, Kyle, Brad, Eric and Megan as well as Luke drink this.
