= 2021 Heaven Hill strike =

Labour strike in Kentucky, United States

- Part of Striketober
- Date: September 11 – October 23, 2021 (1 month, 1 week and 5 days)
- Location: Bardstown, Kentucky, United States
- Caused by: Disagreements over terms of a new labor contract
- Goals: Guarantees against nontraditional scheduling; Higher wages
- Methods: Picketing; Strike action; Walkout
- Result: New five-year contract that includes: $3.09 hourly pay increase; Increased employer contributions to healthcare; Additional vacation days and overtime guarantees; Guarantees against mandatory weekend work

Parties
United Food and Commercial Workers Local 23D	Heaven Hill

The 2021 Heaven Hill strike was a labor strike involving about 420 workers for the Heaven Hill bourbon whiskey distillery in Bardstown, Kentucky, United States. These workers are members of the United Food and Commercial Workers Local 23D and were on strike since September 11. The labor dispute is over the terms of a new five-year labor contract between the union and the company, which is one of the largest bourbon producers in the world. In particular, union members were concerned about "gray areas" in the contract that they believed could lead to union employees working weekends and extra overtime without pay. Additional concerns from the union were over reduced take-home pay and a removal of the limit on premiums for health care insurance. On September 9, union members voted by about 96 percent to reject the proposed contract and authorized strike action. As a result, the union's existing contract expired without replacement on September 10 and striking commenced the following day.

The strike continued for several weeks, during which time union and company negotiators met on and off. On October 22, over a month into the strike, negotiators announced that a tentative agreement had been reached and that a new contract would be put to a vote the following day. Union members voted to accept the contract, which included guarantees against mandatory weekend work, as well as a $3.09 hourly pay raise over the course of the 5-year contract, increased contributions from the employer to the workers' healthcare plans, and additional vacation days and overtime guarantees.

== Background ==
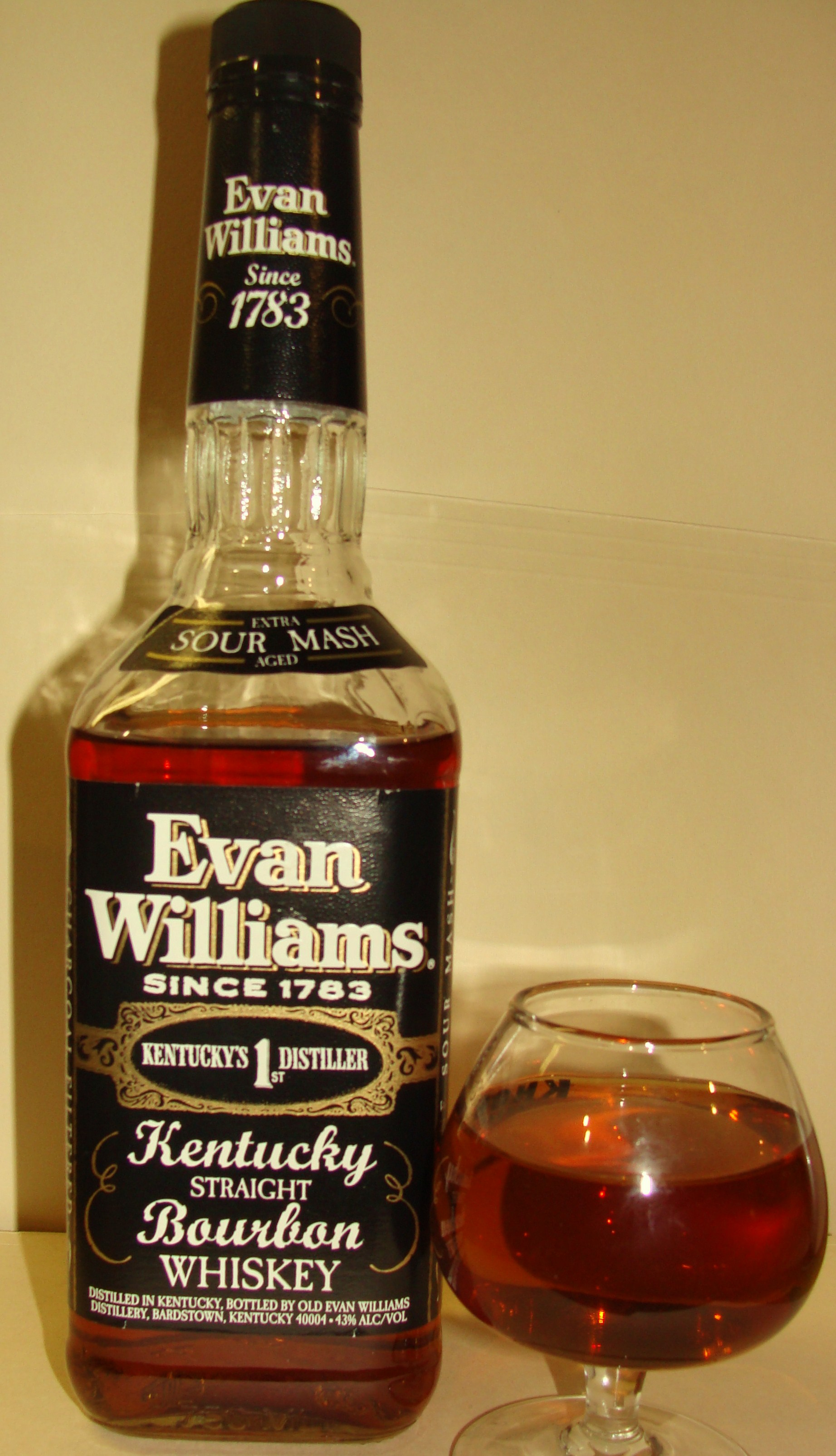
Evan Williams, one of the bourbon brands produced by Heaven Hill

Heaven Hill is a family-owned bourbon whiskey distillery based in Bardstown, Kentucky. The company is one of the largest bourbon producers in the world and produces several brands, including Old Fitzgerald and Evan Williams, which is one of the world's best-selling bourbon brands. Going into September 2021, the company had been negotiating with the United Food and Commercial Workers (UFCW) Local 23D over the terms of a new five-year labor contract that would affect about 240 employees at the facility. These workers were primarily employed in the distillery's barreling and bottling departments. Despite the negotiations, neither side could come to an agreement on a new contract, with the union stating that the company's offers would reduce overtime work and take-home pay and remove a limit on health insurance premiums. In addition, the company indicated that new hires would be assigned to nontraditional schedules that would include working on weekends, though the company was vague about how this would affect existing workers at the distillery. Some workers interpreted the company's statements and certain "gray areas" in the contract to mean that they would be required to work on weekends without extra pay. These contract negotiations were occurring during a time when the bourbon industry was experiencing substantial growth, with sales in the United States for bourbon, rye whiskey, and Tennessee whiskey rising by about 8.2 percent in 2020 amidst the COVID-19 pandemic. During this time, some workers reported working extra overtime, in some cases up to seven days per week. Additionally, labor disputes had recently occurred at other bourbon producers in the area, including at Four Roses and in the 2016 Jim Beam strike. During previous labor contract negotiations in September 2016, Local 23D had held a vote to authorize strike action, but instead the contract proposal was accepted and a strike was averted. On September 9, the union members voted overwhelmingly to reject a contract proposal offered by the company, with about 96 percent of the members voting against it. In addition, the union members voted to authorize strike action against the company. As a result, the existing contract expired at 11:59 p.m. on September 10 without a replacement, and union members went on strike early the following day.

== Course of the strike ==
Following the walkout, the striking workers began picketing outside of Heaven Hill's facility. Additional pickets were established in several other places around Bardstown. Union members stated that they intended to remain on strike until a satisfactory contract could be agreed to, with one member stating in an interview with local Fox-affiliate WDRB that she was prepared to stay out until Christmas if needed. In a statement released by the company, they said, "We have had productive conversations with the union for several months now regarding components of the contract. We will continue to collaborate with UFCW leadership toward passage of this top-of-class workforce package." Charles Booker, a Democratic member of the Kentucky House of Representatives, also released a statement regarding the strike, saying, "Heaven Hill distillery is already one of the lowest-paying distilleries in the area and with this contract that strips workers of vital protections, they’ve made it clear they don’t value their workers. In some cases, workers have been forced to work seven days a week with no days off, week after week. It’s not right and no one should be asked to make these sacrifices with no consideration for their well-being." Among other politicians to voice their support for the strikers was Margaret Trowe, the Socialist Workers Party candidate for mayor of Louisville, who attended some picket lines in support of the strike. The strike occurred several days before the 2021 Kentucky Bourbon Festival, leading the Lexington Herald-Leader to report that Heaven Hill would not be participating in the event. The COO of the event later stated that Heaven Hill had been scheduled to participate, but withdrew. A day after the strike began, the company sent a letter to Local 23D stating that the strikers health care coverage had been terminated and that the coverage would resume after a new contract was ratified and the strike ended. During the strike, the company stated that they experienced minimal disruptions to their operations due to a contingency plan.

On September 15, in a show of solidarity with the strikers, the local Buffalo Wings & Rings restaurant agreed to not sell any Heaven Hill products until the strike was over. Several other restaurants and bars in the area similarly stopped selling Heaven Hill products. Additional shows of solidarity came from other local unions, such as the Central Labor Council of Louisville, Kentucky, the International Brotherhood of Teamsters, the International Brotherhood of Electrical Workers, and the United Auto Workers. On September 18, while the Kentucky Bourbon Festival was occurring, some local tourist groups had arranged Cheers to Bardstown, an alternative bourbon festival that included participation from some striking workers. The next week, a judge issued a temporary restraining order against the strikers on behalf of Heaven Hill, with the company stating that some picketers near their facility were blocking and damaging delivery trucks, as well as harassing and intimidating people trying to enter the facility. In addition, the company hired security to guard the facility's entrance. However, lawyers representing UFCW stated that the company was exaggerating what the picketers were doing. Later that week, it was reported that company and union negotiators would return to bargaining on September 27. The negotiations were organized by an outside mediator, which, according to a union steward, was not a good sign and showed that the company was not fully willing to restart discussions. Around this same time, there were reports that the company was hiring replacement workers, though the company refused to comment on this. While the union and company did meet for negotiations on September 27, the union stated that the company did not agree to return on September 29 despite a request by the federal mediator.

Around early October, the company sent a letter to some strikers explaining some of the gray areas in the contract and stated that existing workers would not have to take on a nontraditional schedule, though several strikers expressed doubt over the company's statements. On October 4, local CBS-affiliate WLKY reported that about 20 union members had already left Heaven Hill and found employment at other companies, with the article stating that that number could rise the longer the strike lasted. On October 5, union and company negotiators met again for another round of discussions, but as with the previous meetings, no agreement was reached. On October 13, a delivery driver near the facility flipped his truck in an automobile accident after making a "threatening gesture" to picketers near the entrance. On October 18, having declared that the negotiations were at an impasse, Heaven Hill announced their intention to hire permanent replacement workers. The company stated that they had been negotiating "in good faith" with the union, though this was disputed by the local's president, who stated that they had filed an unfair labor practice charge against the company with the National Labor Relations Board. In a statement issued by the union on the same day, they stated that they were still in favor of participating in good faith negotiations and challenged the claim that the negotiations were at an impasse. According to a union negotiator, they had submitted several proposals to the company during discussions that the company refused to consider. At the time of the announcement, wording regarding the nontraditional scheduling was still the biggest point of contention.

On October 21, the two sides resumed negotiations, and the next day, the union and company negotiators reached a tentative agreement for a new labor contract, which was submitted to the rank and file members for a vote on October 23. This deal was ratified that same day, with only 195 votes against the contract. Under the terms of the contract, workers received additional overtime protections and vacation days, as well as guarantees that maintained the 40-hour Monday-through-Friday schedule and ensured that the workers would not have to work mandatory weekends. Additionally, the union members would receive an hourly pay raise of $3.09 for the duration of the contract, as well as a 4.25 percent increase for employer contributions to their healthcare plan.

== See also ==
- Strikes during the COVID-19 pandemic
