= Lincoln Heritage Council =

Local council of the Boy Scouts of America

Lincoln Heritage Council (#205)
- Owner: Scouting America
- Headquarters: Louisville, Kentucky
- Country: United States
- Founded: 1993
- Scout Executive: Jason Pierce
- Website www.lhcbsa.org

The Lincoln Heritage Council (LHC) is a local council of Scouting America serving 64 counties in four states: Kentucky, Indiana, Illinois, and Tennessee.

== History ==
The Lincoln Heritage Council is one of the oldest local Councils serving both urban and rural areas in the United States. Their first charter was granted under the name Louisville Area Council in 1912. The council was then renamed to the Old Kentucky Home Council. In 1992, the George Rogers Clark Council merged with the Old Kentucky Home Council, forming the Lincoln Heritage Council. In 2012, the territory of the Shawnee Trails Council was transferred to the Lincoln Heritage Council, becoming the Western Service Area in the Lincoln Heritage Council

Shawnee Trails Council was formed from the merger of the Four Rivers Council and the Audubon Council. The Four Rivers Council originally served youth within the area bounded by the Tennessee and Mississippi Rivers, the Tennessee state line except for South Fulton, TN and the river counties in Southern Illinois. Audubon originally served youth within a jagged border formed by the Ohio, Rough, Tennessee, and Barren Rivers. In 1951, the Cogioba Council, headquartered in Bowling Green merged with the West Kentucky Area Council to form the Audubon Council serving a good third of Kentucky. In the early 1990s, Audubon merged with the Paducah based Four Rivers Council, adding the additional counties on the other side of the Tennessee River as well as counties in southern Illinois and northwestern Tennessee with the exception of the Fort Campbell military reservation in southern Trigg and Christian counties, which remained a part of the Middle Tennessee Council.

The Wapiti District is the home of Camp Rotary at Temple Hill, run by the Rotary Scout Foundation. The camp was the former home camp belonging to the long-merged Cogioba Council. Rotary Scout Reservation provided the setting for the B-P Rover Crew's semi-annual Rover Scout Wee Moot, the longest-running Rover Scout Moot in the United States, which took place from 1953 to 1993, with a reunion held in 1999.

== Organization ==
The council is organized into seven districts within two service areas.

- Buffalo Trails District (Bullitt, Spencer, and the west & southeast Jefferson counties)
- Four Rivers District (Hardin, Massac and Pope counties in Illinois; Ballard, Calloway, Carlisle, Fulton, Graves, Hickman, Livingston, McCracken, Marshall, Livingston, Lyon and Trigg* counties in Kentucky; and Fulton and Obion counties in Tennessee)
- Great Meadows District (Christian*, Daviess, Hancock, Henderson, Hopkins, McLean, Muhlenberg, Ohio, Todd, Union and Webster counties in Kentucky)
- Lewis & Clark District (Clark, Scott, Washington, Harrison, Crawford, and Floyd counties in Indiana)
- Lincoln Trail District (Hardin, Grayson, Breckinridge, Meade, Washington, Taylor, Marion, Nelson, and LaRue counties)
- Seneca District (Carroll, Henry, Oldham, Shelby, Trimble, and Northeast Jefferson County)
- Wapiti District (Allen, Adair, Barren, Butler, Cumberland, Edmonson, Green, Hart, Logan Metcalfe, Monroe, Simpson, and Warren counties in Kentucky)

(* - The parts of Christian and Trigg counties that are contained within Fort Campbell, KY (US Army base) are served by the Middle Tennessee Council.)

== Camps ==
=== Harry S. Frazier Jr. Scout Reservation ===
The Harry S. Frazier Jr. Scout Reservation is located in Clermont, Kentucky. It was originally created as the Old Kentucky Home Scout Reservation. Its primary draw is its week-long summer camp, Camp Crooked Creek, which offers advancement opportunities to Scouts BSA. It offers the following program areas in which Scouts can advance: Range and Target Activities, Ecology, STEM, Handicraft, Aquatics and Outdoor Skills. The camp features a first year camper program known as Dan Boone Hill. Elements for older Scouts include COPE course, climbing tower, and ATV program.

=== Tunnel Mill Scout Reservation ===
Tunnel Mill Scout Reservation is located in Charlestown, Indiana. It includes the John Work House and Mill Site, a Registered Historic Place. Tunnel Mill held summer camps as early as 1917 and yearly under the direction of the George Rogers Clark Council (after it was formed) from 1928 - 1992. After merging into the Lincoln Heritage Council in 1993, it has been used regularly for Cub Scout Day camps, Webelos camps, and various camporees and Order of the Arrow activities, while still being utilized for various unit activities when camp schedules permit.

=== Pfeffer Scout Reservation ===
Pfeffer Scout Reservation (PSR) is located on the shores of Kentucky Lake near Aurora. From 1973 to 1983, PSR took advantage of Scouting America's attempt to create regional Outdoor Adventure ("High Adventure") bases around the nation. A "first year camper" program offered at the camp was featured in the March/April 1981 issue of Scouting magazine, which resulted in similar programs being offered in all Scouting America camps nationally. The Land Between the Lakes National Outdoor Adventure Center was a cooperative effort between Scouting America and the Tennessee Valley Authority (TVA). Scouting America officially abandoned the National base but permitted the Four Rivers Council to continue to offer high adventure-related facilities for sailing, canoeing, kayaking and U.S. Coast Guard approved Sailing training.

PSR has been used for summer camp since August 1956. Prior to 1957, summer camp was at Camp Pakentuck (named as a contraction of Paducah, Kentucky) in Southern Illinois. Summer Camp was held in both locations in 1956, first at Camp Pakentuck and then three weeks of rough "outpost" camping in early August at Kentucky Lake. Camp Pakentuck was owned by the Four Rivers Council but was also used by the Egyptian Council of Southern Illinois, and was sold to the Catholic Diocese of Belleville where it became part of the larger Camp Ondessonk. PSR was originally named the Kentucky Lake Scout Reservation, which was later changed to the Four Rivers Scout Camp (frequently called the Four Rivers Scout Reservation in earlier years), with a change to Camp Roy C. Manchester in 1979. Its name change to Pfeffer Scout Reservation was made in 2018. PSR was also the home camp of the former White Feather Lodge, Order of the Arrow and White Horse Lodge, Order of the Arrow.

While participating at summer camp, Scouts take part in traditional flag raising and lowering ceremonies. Summer camp at PSR offers Scouts a chance to learn Scout Skills in a safe, outdoor environment. The camp has sixteen campsites located on over four hundred acres of land and six miles of shoreline. Program focus includes, the First Year Camper (Eaglebound) program and a variety of aquatics activities—including sailing, water skiing, motor boating, swimming, canoeing, rowing, and fishing. Older Scouts have the opportunity to sail on Kentucky Lake, the largest artificial lake by surface area east of the Mississippi River. Current programs for older scouts include Aquabase High-Adventure Sailing, a week-long sailing experience.

=== Camp Wildcat Hollow ===
Camp Wildcat Hollow and the Badget Scout Reservation was a 1,200 acres (4.9 km^{2}) camp located in Russellville, Kentucky. Camp Wildcat Hollow served as the Audubon Council summer camp until the program was moved to Camp Roy C. Manchester in 1995 as part of the merger with Four Rivers Council. Camp Wildcat Hollow was used by Shawnee Trails Council and later by Lincoln Heritage Council as a training facility, Cub Scout day camp, and camporee site, and for OA events. Camp Wildcat Hollow was also the home camp of the former Wapiti Lodge. Camp Wildcat Hollow and the Badget Reservation was unsuccessfully offered for sale to a local government for use as a public park. It was sold to a private owner in 2018 and is no longer open to the public.

== Order of the Arrow ==
=== Nguttitehen Lodge #205 ===
The council currently is served by the Nguttitehen Lodge #205. The lodge was formed in the merger between White Horse Lodge #201 and Talligewi Lodge #62 in 2012. The lodge totem is a fire, representing the fire of cheerfulness. The lodge name is Lenni-Lenape meaning "to be of one heart and one mind:".

==== Talligewi Lodge #62 ====
Talligewi Lodge #62 was first chartered on January 1, 1995. The creation of the Lodge came as a result of the merger between Tseyedin Lodge #65 of the George Rogers Clark Area Council and Zit-Kala-Sha Lodge #123 of the Old Kentucky Home Council.

A merger committee of four advisers and six youth from each lodge and the OA Staff Advisor met several times in the late Spring and Summer of 1994 to work out details of the merger. Both lodges interacted somewhat at the National Order of the Arrow Conference held at Purdue University and came together that fall for a joint Fall Fellowship weekend at Tunnel Mill Scout Reservation.

The totem for Talligewi Lodge #62 was a Mandan Indian. The Talligewi were an ancient tribe that was thought to have been wiped out at the Battle of Sand Island at the Falls of the Ohio River between Clarksville, IN and Louisville, KY. A brief history of the Talligewi Indian tribe can be seen here.

===== Tseyedin Lodge #65 =====
Tseyedin Lodge #65 was chartered in 1932. The totem for Tseyedin Lodge #65 is the raccoon. Tseyedin means cliff dweller as represented on the original round patches. The two arrowhead and first flap have a poor representation of the raccoon (not a fox as has been misrepresented at times) The raccoon which was on the first solid flap and since came about by an actual raccoon skin being sent to the patch manufacturer so they could correct the design.

===== Zit-Kala-Sha Lodge #123 =====
Zit-Kala-Sha Lodge #123 was chartered in 1938. The totem for Zit-Kala-Sha Lodge #123 was the cardinal since this bird is so prevalent throughout Kentucky and the lodge's name translates to “Red Bird” in the Sioux language.

==== White Horse Lodge #201 ====
White Horse Lodge #201 was first chartered on January 1, 1996. The creation of the Lodge came as a result of the merger between Wapiti Lodge #367 of the Audubon Council and White Feather Lodge #499 of the Four Rivers Council. White Horse Lodge was selected as the name of the replacement lodge as (i) the horse was important to the Native American, and (ii) white was arguably part of both predecessor lodges (as Wapiti meant American, or white, elk and the former White Feather Lodge).

===== Wapiti Lodge #367 =====
Wapiti Lodge was first chartered in 1949 and its totem was the American Elk. Wapiti means elk in the Shawnee language.

====== Land of the Big Caves and Walah Elemamekhaki Lodges #405 ======
Land of the Big Caves Lodge #405 of the Mammoth Caves Council was first chartered in 1949 and changed its name to Walah Elemamekhaki Lodge #405 in 1950. Its totem was a Kodiak Grizzly Bear. The lodge was absorbed by Wapiti Lodge #367 in 1952.

===== White Feather Lodge #499 =====
A precursor to the lodge, called the White Feather Society, was founded at Camp Pakentuck (a combination name of Paducah and Kentucky) in southern Illinois in 1951. The Society was modeled after Blackhawk Lodge from Illinois, as the camp director at the time had been active in the Blackhawk Lodge. The Society issued a red ribbon with a white feather silk screened on it. A few neckerchiefs with the white feather silk screened on them are known to exist. The society was converted into an OA lodge in 1953 via a ceremonial team from Zit-Kala-Sha Lodge #123. Don Thom performed the role of Allowat Sakima during the ceremony. In 1957, the lodge changed its home camp to Camp Roy C. Manchester on Kentucky Lake.

Thomas Fielder, of Paducah, Kentucky, was elected National Conference Chief in December 1968 at the Order of the Arrow national committee meeting for a 2-year term. After his election, White Feather Lodge created the first patch to honor a National Chief.

== See also ==
- Scouting in Kentucky
