= Jim Beam =

American brand of bourbon whiskey

- Logo as of 2023
- Type: Bourbon whiskey
- Manufacturer: Suntory Global Spirits (d/b/a James B. Beam Distilling Co.)
- Origin: United States
- Introduced: 1795 "Old Jake Beam Sour Mash"; 1880, "Old Tub"; 1943, "Jim Beam"
- Proof (US): 80
- Website: jimbeam.com

Jim Beam is a brand of bourbon whiskey produced in Kentucky by the Japanese distilled beverage conglomerate Suntory Global Spirits.

It is one of the best-selling brands of bourbon in the world. Since 1795 (interrupted by Prohibition), seven generations of the Beam family have been involved in whiskey production for the company that produces the brand. The brand name became "Jim Beam" in 1943 in honor of James B. Beam, who rebuilt the business after Prohibition ended. Previously produced by the Beam family and later owned by the Fortune Brands holding company, the brand was purchased by Suntory Holdings in 2014.

== History ==
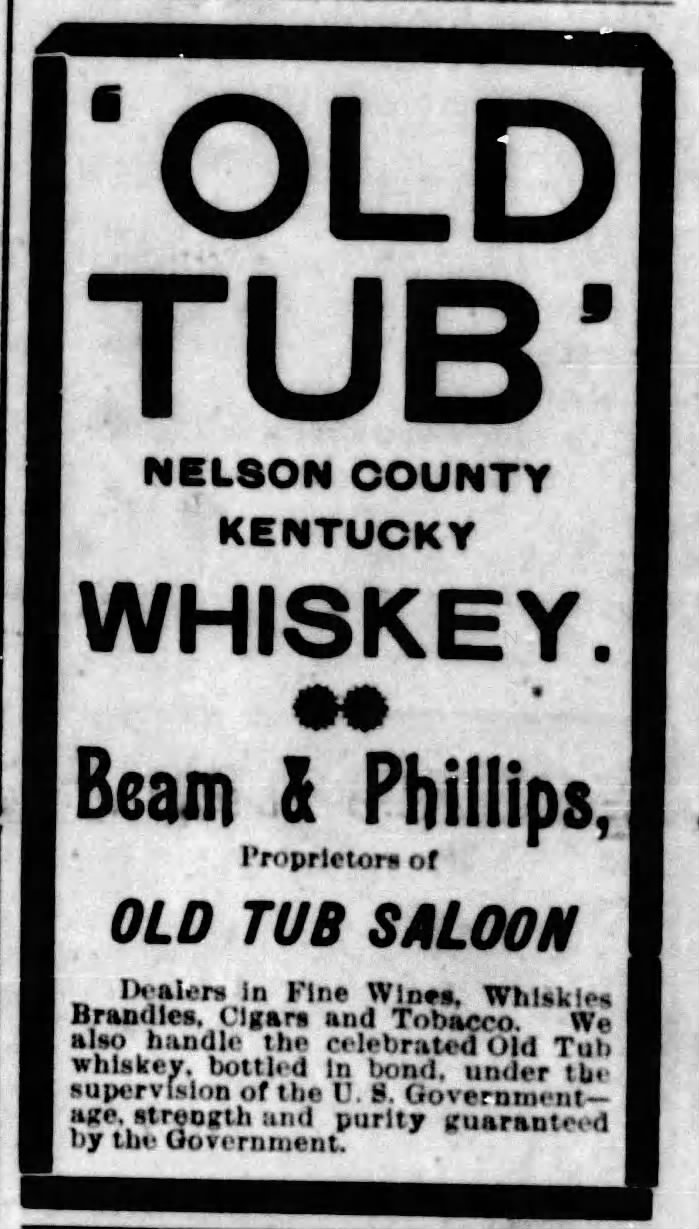
'Old Tub' advertisement from The Nelson County Record, August 19, 1898

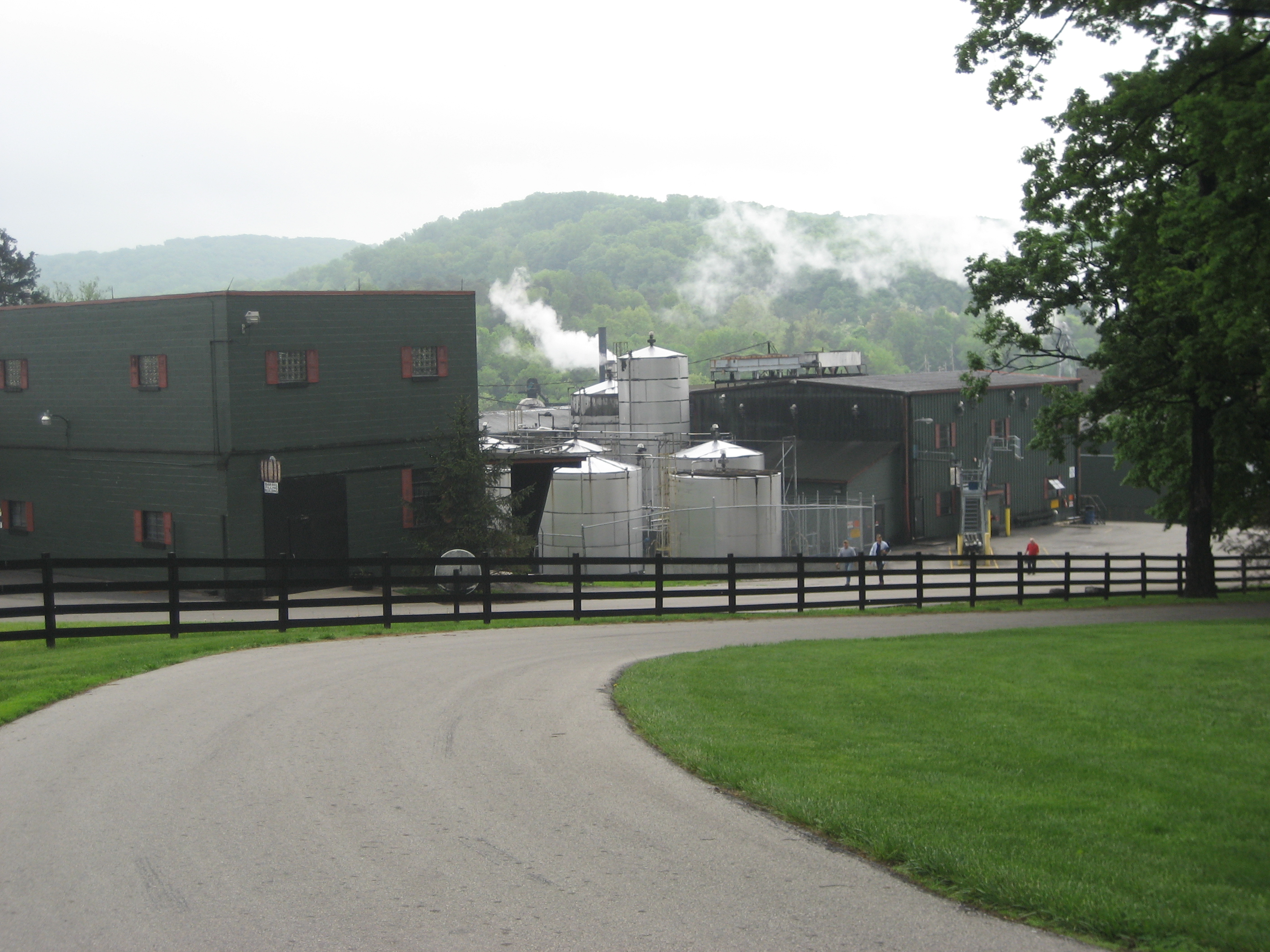
Clermont distillery in 2008

During the late 18th century, members of the Böhm family, who eventually changed the spelling of their surname to "Beam", emigrated from Germany and settled in Kentucky. Johannes "Jacob" Beam (1760–1834) was a farmer who began producing whiskey in the style that became bourbon. Jacob Beam sold his first barrels of corn whiskey around 1795, then called Old Jake Beam. Beam's son David Beam (1802–1854) took on his father's responsibilities in 1820 at age 18, expanding distribution of the family's bourbon during the Industrial Revolution. David M. Beam (1833–1913) in 1854 moved the distillery to Nelson County to capitalize on the growing network of railroad lines connecting states. Until 1880, customers would bring their own jugs to the distillery to fill them with whiskey. In 1880, the company started bottling the product and selling it nationally under the brand name "Old Tub". James Beauregard Beam (1864–1947) managed the family business from 1892 until 1944, rebuilding the distillery in 1933–1934 in Clermont, Kentucky, near his Bardstown home.

In 1943, the brand name was changed from "Old Tub" to "Jim Beam", after James Beauregard Beam, and some of the bottle labels bear the statement "None Genuine Without My Signature" and the signature of James B. Beam. In 1945, the company was purchased by Harry Blum, a Chicago spirits merchant. The Beam company was purchased by American Brands in 1968. T. Jeremiah Beam (1899–1977) started working at the Clear Springs distillery in 1913, later becoming the master distiller and overseeing operations at the new Clermont facility. Jeremiah Beam eventually gained full ownership. In 1954 the company acquired the Churchill Downs distillery near Boston, Kentucky, later naming it after Booker Noe.

Booker Noe (Frederick Booker Noe II, 1929–2004), grandson of Jim Beam, was the Master Distiller at the Jim Beam Distillery for more than 40 years, working closely with Master Distiller Jerry Dalton. In 1988 Booker introduced his namesake bourbon, Booker's, the company's first uncut, straight-from-the-barrel bourbon.

In 1987, Jim Beam purchased National Distillers, acquiring brands including Old Crow, Bourbon de Luxe, Old Taylor, Old Grand-Dad, and Sunny Brook. Old Taylor was subsequently sold to the Sazerac Company. Jim Beam was part of the holding company formerly known as Fortune Brands that was dismantled in 2011. Other parts of the remaining company were spun off as an IPO on the NYSE on the same day, as Fortune Brands Home & Security, and the liquor division of the holding company was renamed Beam, Inc. on October 4, 2011. In 2014 Beam Inc. was purchased by Suntory Holdings Ltd., a Japanese food and beverage group. The combined company was known as Beam Suntory until May 2024, when it was re-branded as Suntory Global Spirits.

On August 4, 2003, a fire destroyed a Jim Beam aging warehouse in Bardstown, Kentucky. It held 15,000 barrels (795,000 US gal or 3,010,000 L) (Note: A typical bourbon barrel contains about 53 US gal or 200 L.) of bourbon. Flames rose more than 100 feet from the structure. Burning bourbon spilled from the warehouse into a nearby creek. An estimated 19,000 fish died of the bourbon in the creek and a river. On July 3, 2019, another warehouse caught fire with the loss of around 45,000 barrels (2,385,000 US gal or 9,030,000 L) of bourbon. The fire led to the spillage of bourbon into the Kentucky River and Glenns Creek. Learning from the 2003 fire it was decided not to use water, letting it burn itself out to reduce runoff into the ecosystem. The Kentucky Energy and Environment Cabinet (KEEC) released a statement via their official Facebook page stating the alcohol plume had reached 23 mi (37 km) between Owenton and Carrollton. The KEEC along with local and federal agencies used aeration to increase the oxygen levels in the water to prevent additional fish kill.

In 2017, White Coffee Corp partnered with Jim Beam and a line of bourbon flavored coffees was created.

Jim Beam announced in December 2025 that they would be shutting down production for a year at the main Clermont distillery, starting January 1, 2026. Due to a downturn in whiskey consumption and export sales, production will cease but the visitor center will remain open. Industry group Distilled Spirits Council of the United States said that U.S. spirits exports to Canada plummeted 85 percent, falling below $10 million in the second quarter of 2025, which CEO Chris Swonger blamed on "persistent trade tensions."

== Distilleries ==
- James B. Beam Distilling Co. in Clermont, Kentucky
- Jim Beam Booker Noe Plant in Boston, Kentucky
- Jim Beam Old Grand Dad Plant in Frankfort, Kentucky
- Fred B Noe Distillery in Clermont, Kentucky

== Products ==
Jim Beam White Label, Beam's high-volume label

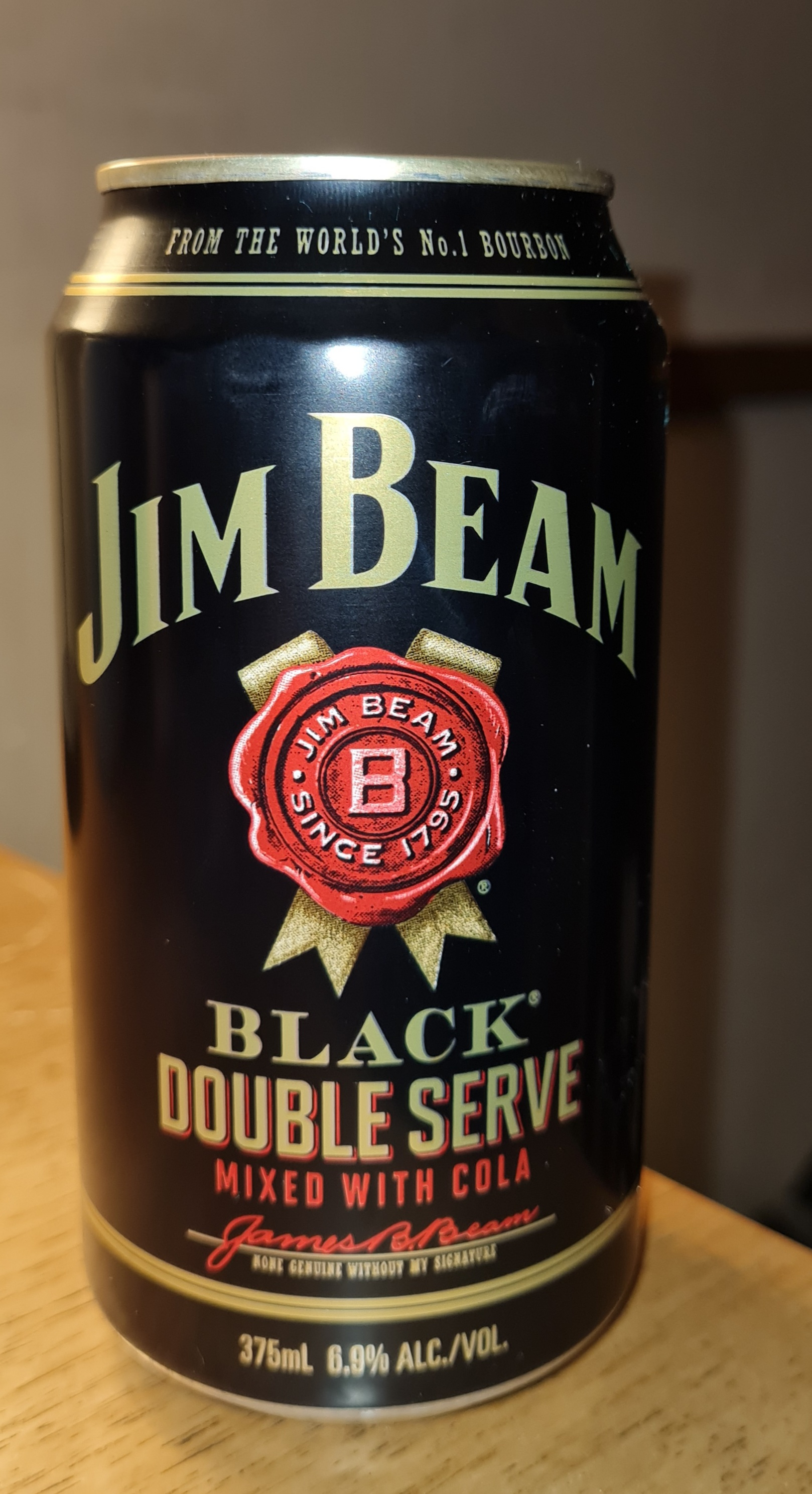
A 375 mL can of Jim Beam Black mixed with Cola. Double served. 6.9% ALC/VOL

Red Stag black cherry bourbon liqueur

Several varieties bearing the Jim Beam name are available.

=== Straight bourbon whiskey ===
- Jim Beam Kentucky Straight Bourbon Whiskey – The flagship Jim Beam bourbon, aged for four years in new charred oak barrels and bottled at 40% alcohol by volume (80 proof).
- Jim Beam Black – Jim Beam aged for seven years and bottled at 45% alcohol by volume (90 proof).
- Jim Beam Devil's Cut – Original Jim Beam blended with bourbon extracted from the cask's wood after emptying. Bottled at 45% alcohol by volume (90 proof).
- Jim Beam Double Oak – Jim Beam bourbon aged in two separate barrels. Bottled at 43% alcohol by volume (86 proof).
- Jim Beam Single Barrel – Bourbon aged in a single barrel. Alcohol content varies by batch.
- Jim Beam Sunshine Blend – A blend of original Jim Beam and bourbon made with brown rice, aged for four years. Bottled at 40% alcohol by volume (80 proof).
- Jim Beam Winter Reserve – Jim Beam aged for six years and finished in two toasted barrels. Bottled at 43% alcohol by volume (86 proof).

=== Straight rye whiskey ===
- Jim Beam Rye – Rye whiskey, bottled at 40% alcohol by volume (80 proof).

=== Small batch bourbon ===
Beam's "Small Batch Bourbon Collection" consists of several bourbons where the Beam name appears on the labels and marketing materials but is less prominent.

- Booker's: aged 6+ years, 120–129.2 proof (60–64.60% ABV)
- Baker's: aged 7 years, 107 proof (53.5% ABV)
- Basil Hayden's: aged 6 to 8 years, 80 proof (40% ABV); uses the Old Grand-Dad "high-rye" mash bill.
- Knob Creek: aged 9 years, 100 proof (50% ABV), with a 9-year, 120-proof (60% ABV) single-barrel expression, and a 100 proof (50% ABV) rye whiskey.

Several of these offerings have performed quite well at international spirits ratings competitions. For example, Jim Beam's Black label was awarded a double gold medal at the 2009 San Francisco World Spirits Competition. Jim Beam Black also won a Gold Outstanding medal at the 2013 International Wine and Spirit Competition.

== Process ==
Bourbon whiskey distillers must follow government standards for production. By law (27 CFR 5), any "straight" bourbon must be: produced in the United States; made of a grain mix of at least 51% corn; distilled at no higher than 160 proof (80% ABV); free of any additives (except water to reduce proof for aging and bottling); aged in new, charred oak barrels; entered into the aging barrels at no higher than 125 proof (62.5% ABV), aged for a minimum of 2 years, and bottled at no less than 80 proof (40% ABV).

Jim Beam starts with water filtered naturally by the limestone shelf found in Central Kentucky. A strain of yeast used since the end of Prohibition is added to a tank with the grains to create what is known as "dona yeast", used later in the fermentation process. Hammermills grind the mix of corn, rye and barley malt to break it down for easier cooking. The mix is then moved into a large mash cooker where water and set back are added. The "set back" is a portion of the old mash from the previous distillation—the key step of the sour mash process, ensuring consistency from batch to batch. The distillery produces two different whiskeys based on two different mash bills, each used depending on the product line.

From the cooker, the mash heads to the fermenter where it is cooled to 60–70 °F (16–21 °C) and yeast is added again. The yeast is fed by the sugars in the mash, producing heat, carbon dioxide and alcohol. Called "distiller's beer" or "wash", the resulting liquid (after filtering to remove solids) looks, smells and tastes like (and essentially is) a form of beer. The wash is pumped into a column still where it is heated to over 200 °F (93 °C), causing the alcohol to turn to a vapor.

The distillate at about 125 proof is moved to new charred American oak barrels, each of which hold about 53 US gallons (200 L) of liquid. A "bung" is used to seal the barrels before moving them to nearby hilltop rackhouses where they will age up to nine years. As the seasons change, natural weather variations expand and contract the barrel wood, allowing bourbon to seep into the barrel, and the caramelized sugars from the charred oak flavor and color the bourbon. A significant portion (known as the "angel's share") of the bourbon escapes the barrel through evaporation, or stays trapped in the wood of the barrel. Jim Beam ages for at least four years, or twice as long as the government requires for a "straight" bourbon. Aging for at least four years also allows the distillery to legally dispense with an age statement on the bottle.

== Global markets ==
Jim Beam is one of the best-selling brands of bourbon in the world. Outside the United States, Beam Global Spirits & Wine has had a sales and distribution alliance with The Edrington Group since 2009.

== See also ==
- Jack Daniel's, an American Tennessee whiskey
- List of historic whisky distilleries
- Maker's Mark, a premium sister brand of bourbon produced by Beam Suntory
- Robby Gordon Motorsports, a racing team sponsored by Jim Beam from 2005 to 2009
- 2016 Jim Beam strike
