= Fred Minnick =

American writer (born 1978)

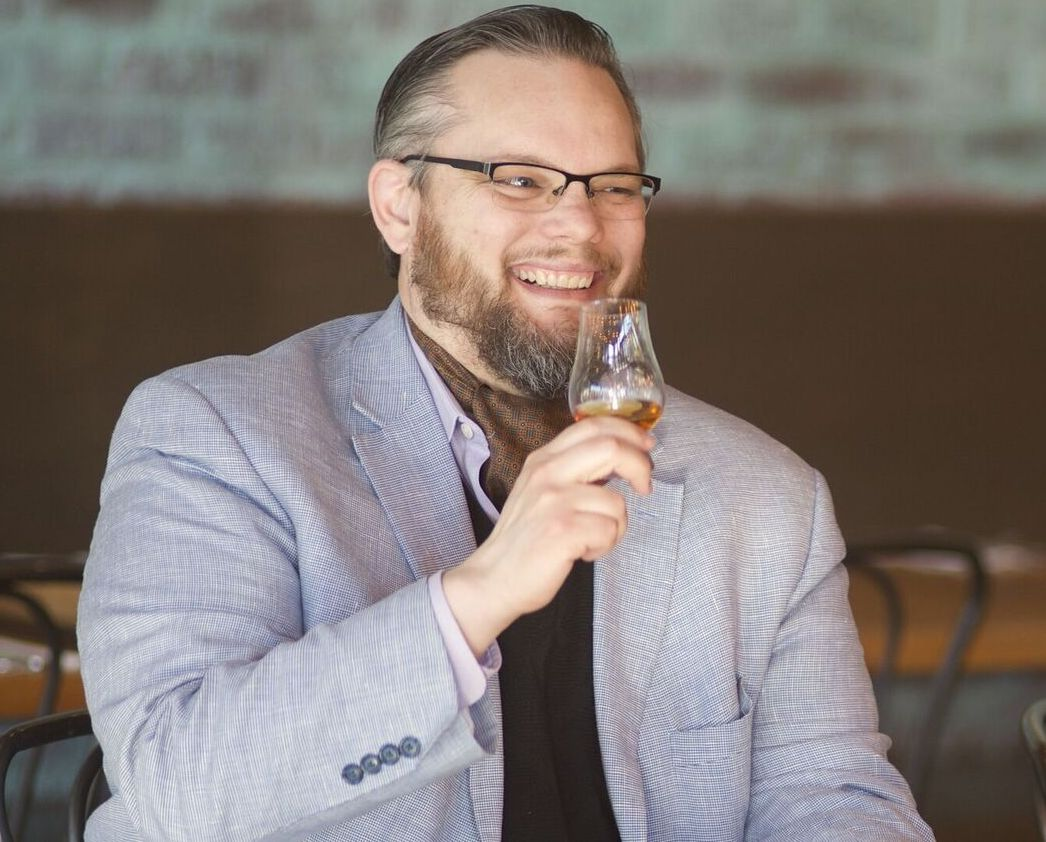
Fred Minnick

Fred Minnick is an American wine and spirits writer.

Minnick began professionally writing about wine and spirits in 2006. He helped found Bourbon+, which covers the bourbon industry. Since 2013, Minnick has worked with the Kentucky Derby Museum to present the popular Legends Series of Bourbon.

Minnick wrote Whiskey Women: The Untold Story of How Women Saved Bourbon, Scotch & Irish Whiskey (Potomac, October 2013).
