= John Work House and Mill Site =

Historic house in Indiana, United States

- U.S. National Register of Historic Places
- U.S. Historic district
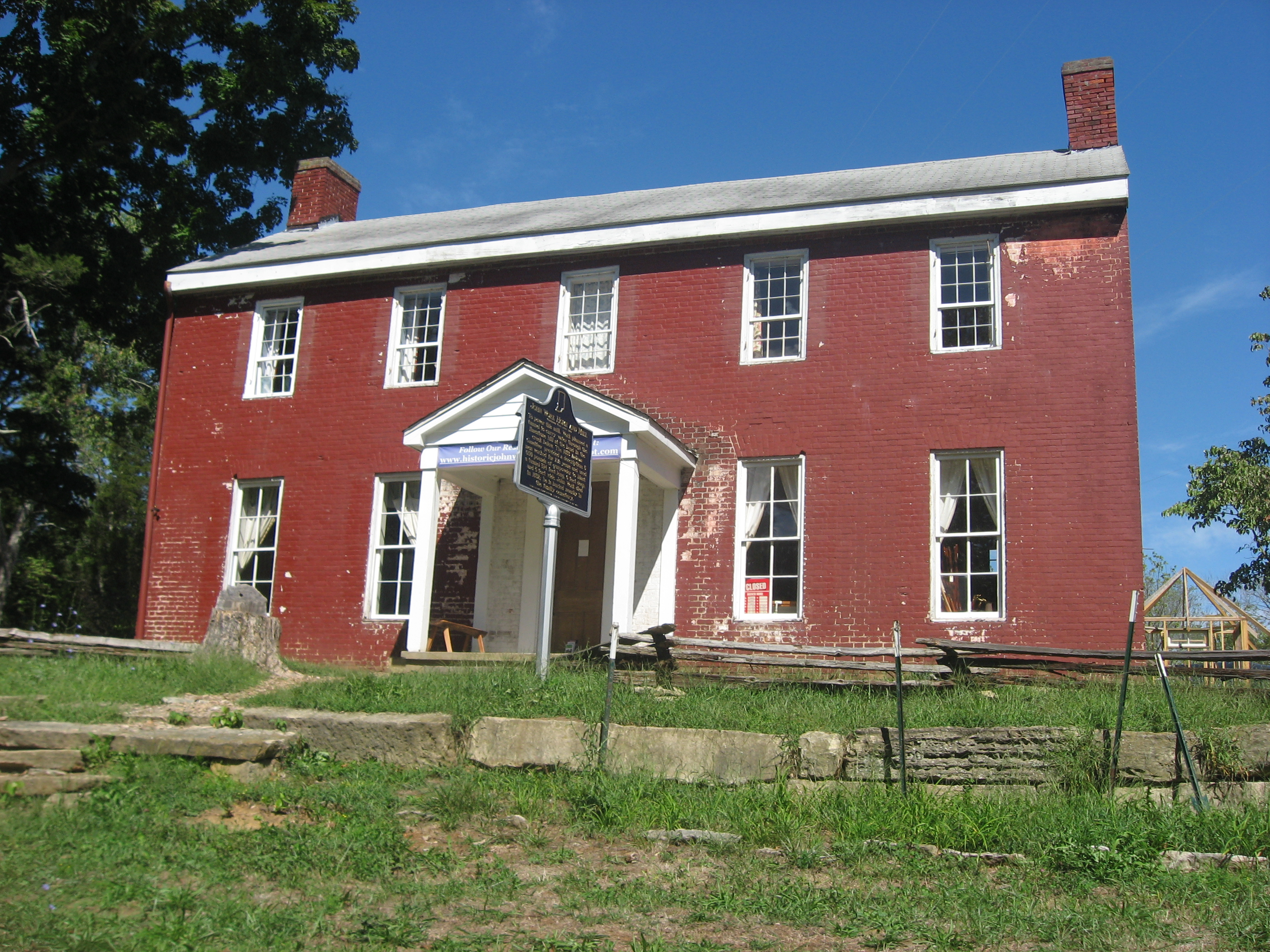
- John Work House in 2012

- Location within Clark County, Indiana Location within Indiana Location within the United States
- Location: Northern side of Tunnel Mill Rd., west of Fourteen Mile Creek and northeast of Charlestown, Charlestown Township, Clark County, Indiana
- Coordinates: 38°28′54″N 85°37′34″W
- Area: 23 acres (9.3 ha)
- Built: 1811 (house), 1814 (mill)
- Architect: John Work
- Architectural style: Federal
- NRHP reference No.: 00001546
- Added to NRHP: January 3, 2001

John Work House and Mill Site is a site listed on the National Register of Historic Places in Indiana just outside Charlestown, owned by the Lincoln Heritage Council, (Scouting America), as part of the Tunnel Mill Scout Reservation. For a century, it was an active gristmill until technology made it obsolete, and arson destroyed much of it. Prominent features around the site are Fourteen Mile Creek and the Devil's Backbone. The land is now used by Scouting America for camping activities such as National Youth Leadership Training and a Webelos Camp. In 2010, part of the Tunnel Mill camp was leased to a private company for the purpose of restoring the Historic John Work House for use as a living history center. In order to prevent vandalism and amateur ghost hunters from further damaging the building, security guards patrol the property each night.

== Mill days ==
The house was built in 1811. John Work (b. December 9, 1760) used virgin poplar forest to make 4 inches (100 mm) by 8 inches (200 mm) boards. It was originally two story/six room house with chimney for each room that if built today would cost several million dollars.

In 1814 John Work (1760–1834) decided to build a new gristmill, to replace the one he had bought in 1804 from the brothers John and James Bates, for which he paid $10 an acre 100 acres (0.40 km^{2}), but needed repair. It was near the only road leading from Charlestown and New Washington to the growing Madison. Spotting where Fourteen Mile Creek made a S-curve around a limestone ridge and then dropped drastically, five miles (8 km) upcreek from the Ohio River, he decided to create a tunnel through a spur of a hill to act as a mill race, which would mean a better source of water to power his mill. The race was completed in 1816, and the mill itself in 1818. A total of 650 pounds (290 kg) of powder made from saltpeter was used for the tunneling. The total cost was estimated at $3,300. The race was 6 feet (1.8 m) deep and 5 feet (1.5 m) wide; a 200 lb (91 kg) man reportedly rode through it on opening day. A dam was later built for better year around use. Work would be credited for building three more mills upstream.

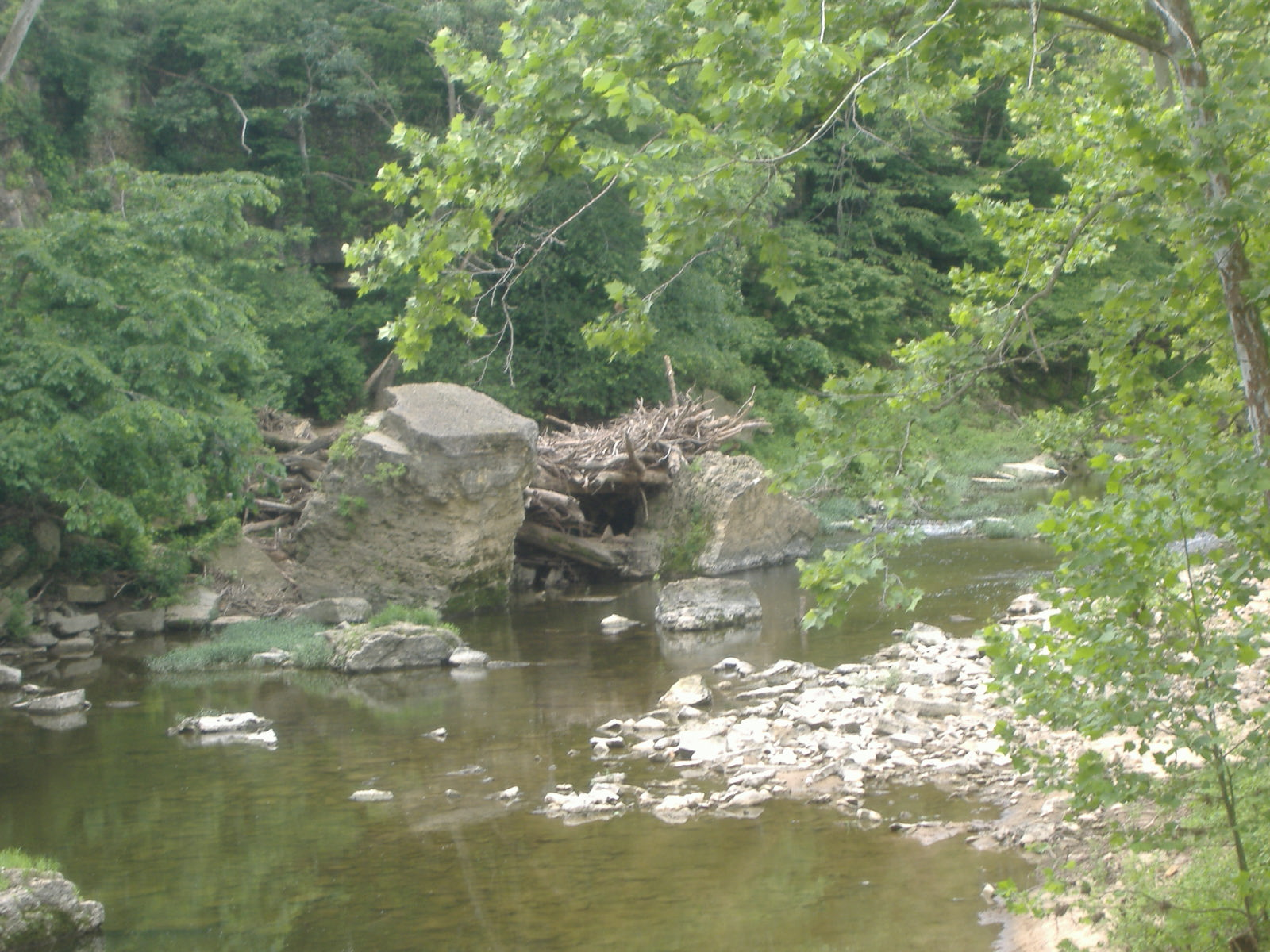
Image of Fourteen Mile Creek near Tunnel Mill, 2011

The mill started operating in 1819. The mill was ideally situated by being a day's ride from New Albany and Madison, the second and third largest cities in Indiana at the time, and for being so close to Ohio River landings. A sawmill was added to the mill, as was a saltworks, powdermill, and still. Tunnel Mill was also the first mill in the region to use a series of elevators to move corn called the Evans and Ellicott's machinery, which made milling the work of two people instead of six, a great technological advantage over those who had to carry sacks of corn all the way to the top of the mill so it could be milled step by step. The mill was able to handle 2.5 barrels of corn an hour. Soon after being built, Work's Mill was the most profitable and efficient in the area. Even after most local small mills closed due to not being able to compete with large urban mills, the Tunnel Mill still operated.

After Work's death on February 1, 1832, the mill would pass through the hands of several owners, and would change with the times. The Mill under Work was a custom mill, where farmer's would just send corn for their own personal use. Future owners would make the mill a merchant mill, where farmers would sell the corn to a mill and the mill would process the corn to sell for itself in various forms, from flour to grits to flakes. Some of this would be shipped on the Ohio and the Mississippi River. The original mill wheel was made of oak, but in the mid-19th century the wheels became metal, as wooden wheels only lasted 5–10 years before needing major repairs. When John Hunt Morgan did his 1863 Raid the mill was seen as being in dangered, as Morgan ransomed other Indiana mills such as Beck's Mill. An addition was added to the house in the 1860s.

Owners
| John Work | 1804–1832 |
| John R. Work | 1832–1854 |
| Wilford M. Green | 1854–1896 |
| Henry C. Dodd | 1897–1920 |
| Shiloh Swango | 1920–1926 |
| Henry Murphy | 1926–1927 |

The mill would remain in operation in the 1920s as the sole remaining operating gristmill in Clark County, but would be sparsely used as mills in Louisville were cleaner and more efficient due to their modern technology. However, the mill was often used as a bathing house for those who liked to swim in the creek. On August 1, 1927, a fire destroyed the mill building. No one knows if it was started by a discarded cigarette, by one of the swimmers, or by the last owner, Henry Murphy, who reportedly had a history of his properties burning. Plans to rebuild the mill in 1958 and 1981 were never realized, although the 1990s did see the addition of a garage to the house.

There were plans for development to occur on the property. In 1904 three developers from Jeffersonville planned an inter-urban trolley line between Charlestown and Madison, and would have placed a fifty-foot hydroelectric dam where the mill's dam would be, which would have made a 100-acre (0.40 km^{2}) lake, for which could be use for public recreation. Engineers at the time decided it was not feasible. The plan was brought back in 1921, but it was also a failure. 1935 would see the last attempt of such a project, but while a new dam was finished in 1936, it produced no electricity. In 1940 rural electrification finally powered the property.

== Work/Faris Cemetery ==
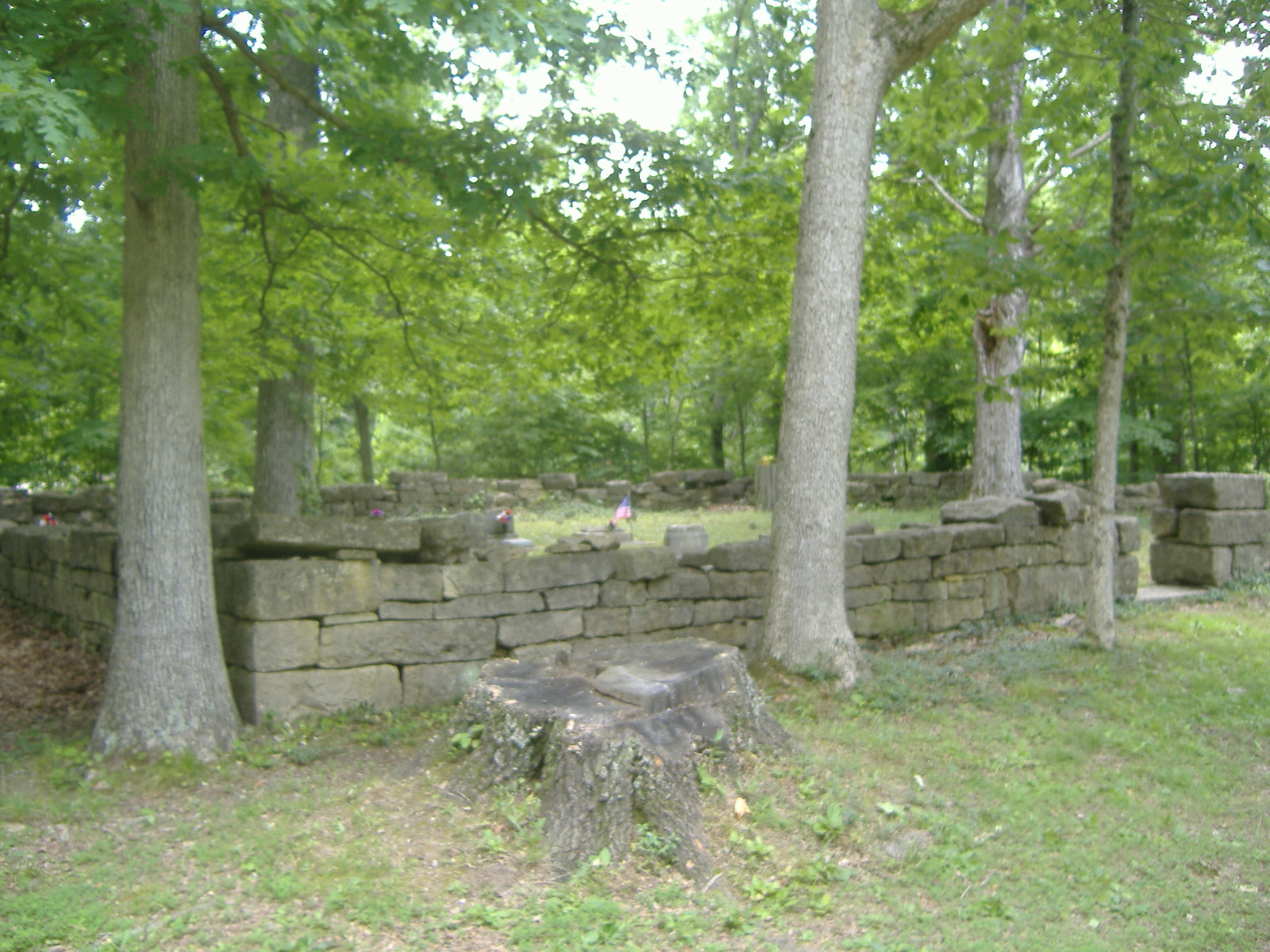
Work/Faris cemetery

A cemetery containing the plots of John Work, his wife Sarah Jackson, and other Clark County pioneers is located on the property. It is by the bridge across Fourteen Mile Creek near the old camp entrance. The last known burial at the cemetery was in 1869 for Rebecca Work Drummond Faris.

== Tunnel Mill Scout Reservation ==
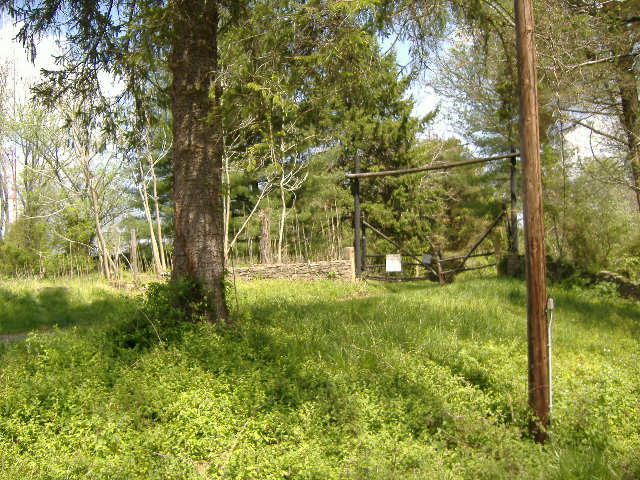
Original entrance to the Camp area

In 1927 Henry Murphy decided he wanted to sell the 142 acres (0.57 km^{2}) of land he held around the burnt mill. The newly formed Boy Scout Council, the George Rogers Clark Council (formed by Scouts of Clark, Floyd, Harrison, Scott, and Washington counties) was seeking an area for a camp. In 1917 local Troop 3 had used the Work property as a summer camp, and used it for three straight summers. On April 2, 1928, Murphy sold the property to the Scouts. Organizations around the area pitched in to improve the property, allowing the camp to open in 1929. A series of three-sided pioneer-style cabins were built near the cemetery in 1933. In 1942 the Scoutmaster's Cabin and Evergreen cabins were completed. In 1950 the McDonald Bridge was completed across Fourteen Mile Creek. The camp saw its greatest use in the 1950s and 1960s, with 564 scouts the highest attendance ever (1960). In 1969 the property's swimming pool was built, as the creek was no longer safe for swimming. In the 1980s The Works Home was renovated by the Camp Ranger Jeff Streets, who then moved into the Works home after completion. Since 1993 the property has seen less use, as George Rogers Clark Council merged with another council, and the rough terrain protects it from development. Since the merger, the camp has been used primarily by Cub Scouts and for winter camping.

On November 6, 1996, Andy Campbell, a ranger serving as the caretaker of the property was shot to death by Roger Caldwell, "a diagnosed, paranoid schizophrenic" who trespassed onto the property while drunk. This was the first such incident in the history of Scouting. Campbell was able to drag himself 50 feet (15 m) to call 911. After police arrived on the scene to get information about the drunk from Campbell, they found Caldwell wandering on Ind-62. Caldwell was sentenced to 70 years in prison, with parole possible after 31 years.

== Legends ==
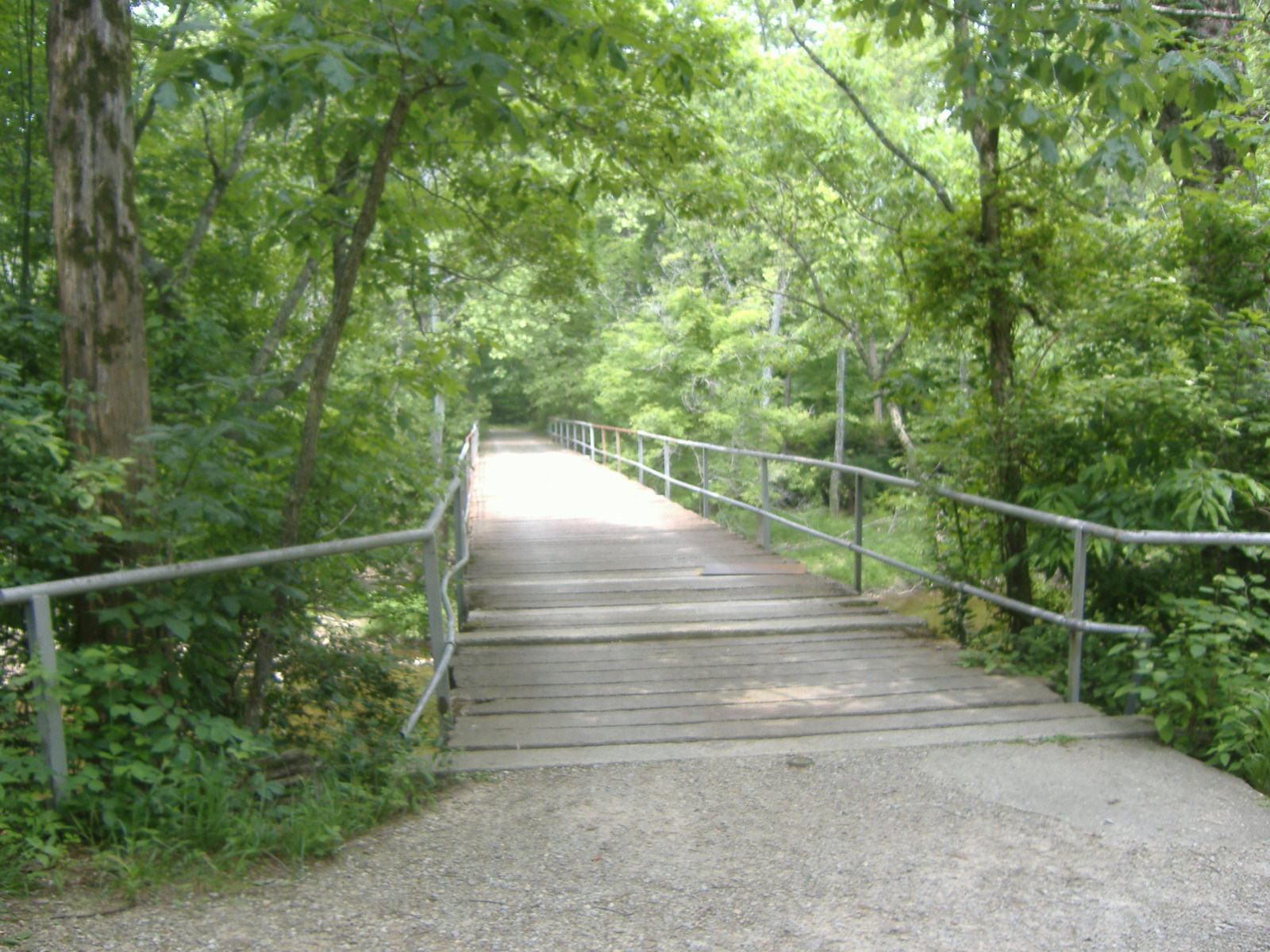
McDonald Bridge

There are many legends surrounding the property. One involves stepping on a particular step on the McDonald Bridge at night. If stepped upon, a ghost will chase you down to kill you unless you race up the hill before it catches you. Another legend is that a cache of gold is somewhere near the old mill. The ghost of John Work reportedly haunts the remains of the mill. Sadly, these legends made the property a target for vandals and ghosthunters. The current renovators see ghost hunters as the biggest threats and attribute most of the ghost legends to "fictional campfire stories" of camping boy scouts and to the rise of popular paranormal television shows.

There is also reportedly a silver mine known to the Indians here. Local Indians had Work mill their corn, and paid him in silver ore. When Work asked of the source of the ore, the Indians said they had a mine, but they would never tell any white where the mine was located. If such a mine exists, it has yet to be found. Gold flakes have been found in the stream, enough to fill a vial.

== Today ==
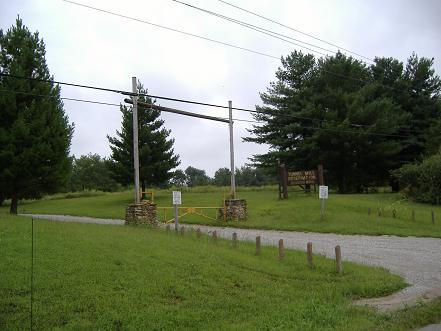
Modern entrance to the camp

Today the property includes a cabin village, a swimming pool, and a dining hall built in 2000. The current dining hall replaced the one from the 1980s that once served as a steakhouse in Jeffersonville. Aside from Scouts, the Civil Air Patrol has used the property for training. The House and the remains of the mill became part of the National Register of Historic Places in 2001.

The restoration of the house was budgeted to cost hundreds of thousands of dollars, and was deemed too expensive for the Lincoln Heritage Council. In 2010, the site was added to the 10 Most Endangered List of Indiana Landmarks, due to the constant vandalism. Earlier in the year, Taylor Rose Historical Outfitters, a private company that specializes in the historical reenactment supplies, contracted with Lincoln Heritage Council to restore and preserve the John Work House, leasing the house for a $1 a year. However, the Work House was seen to have "improved prospects" and was not on the 2011 endangered list. The eventual plan is for the house to become an educational living history center as well as a workshop and storefront for the company's historically focused business operations. Future plans include classes, living history events and a research library, as well as building a mill similar to the one Work had built.

== Gallery ==
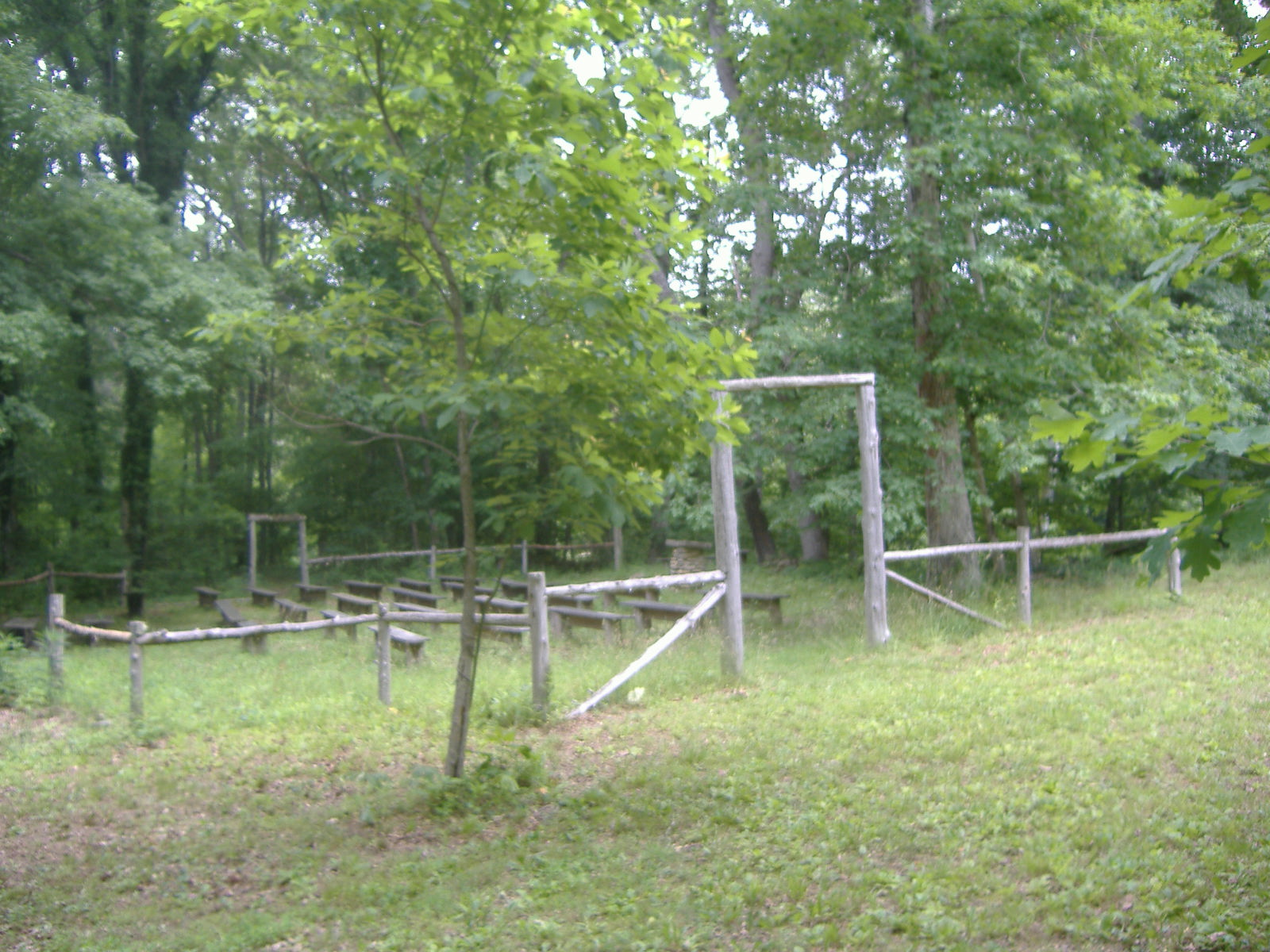
Old Boy Scout Chapel

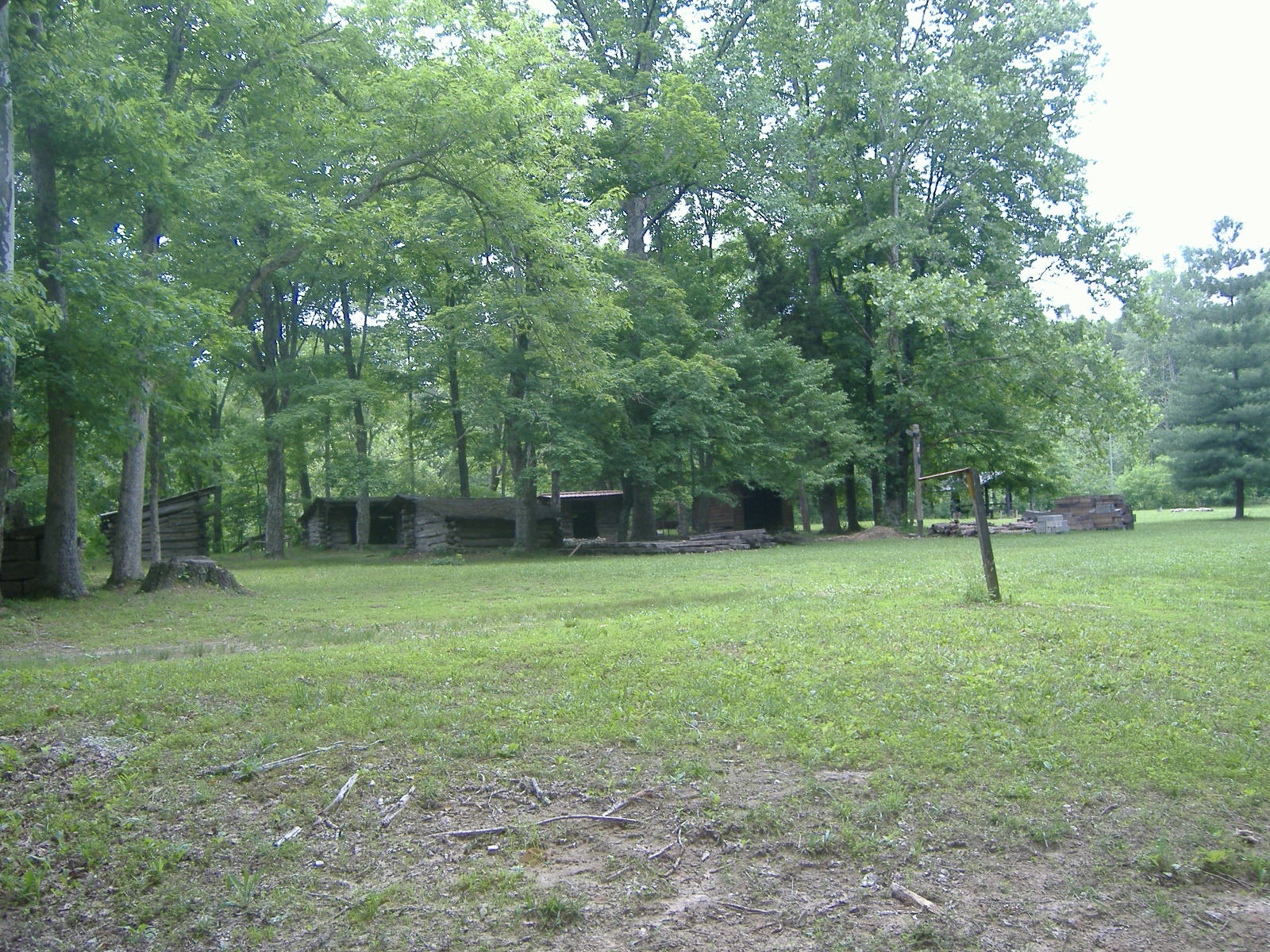
Cabins by the cemetery

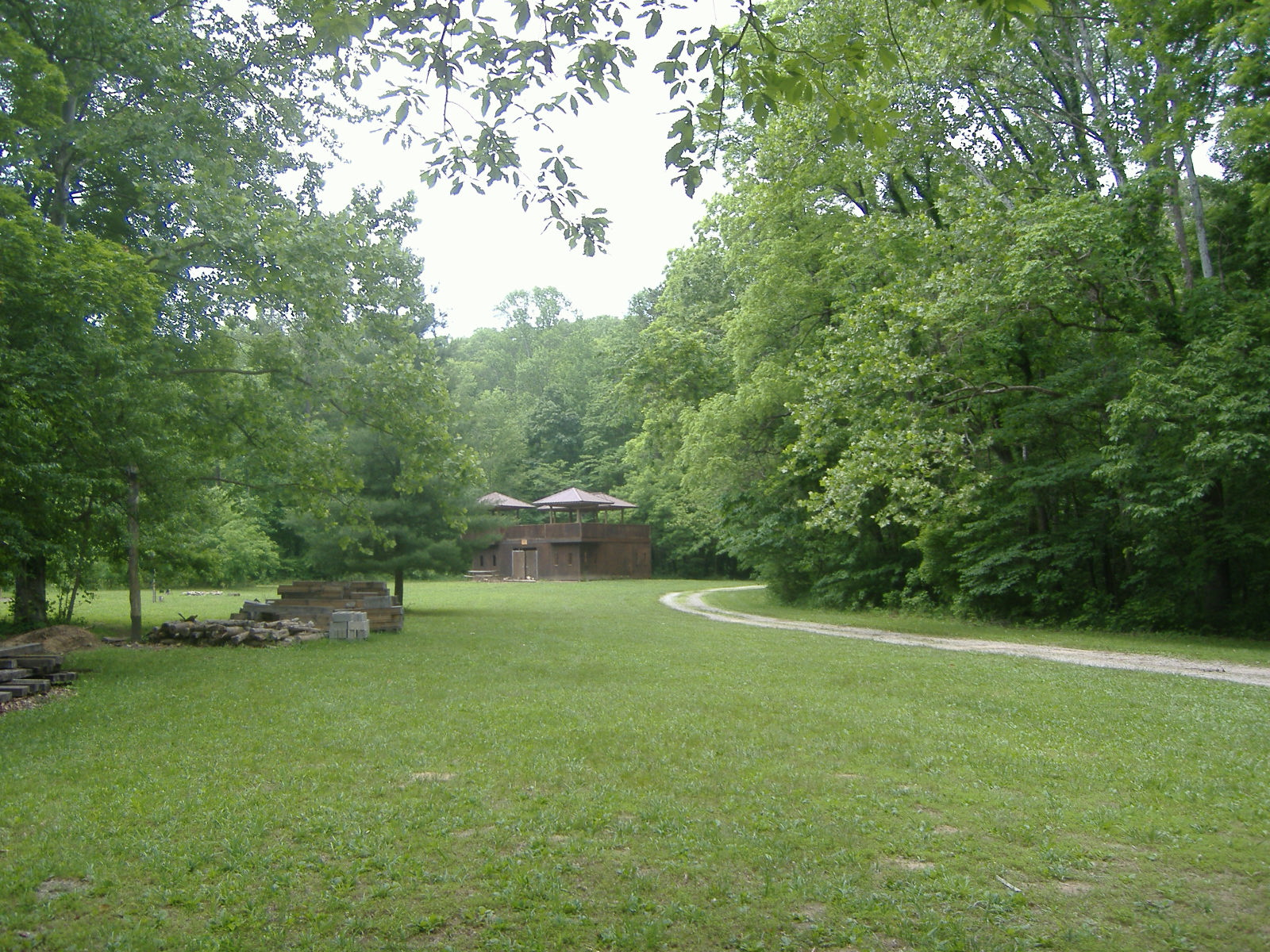
Road from bridge/cemetery to further inside camp

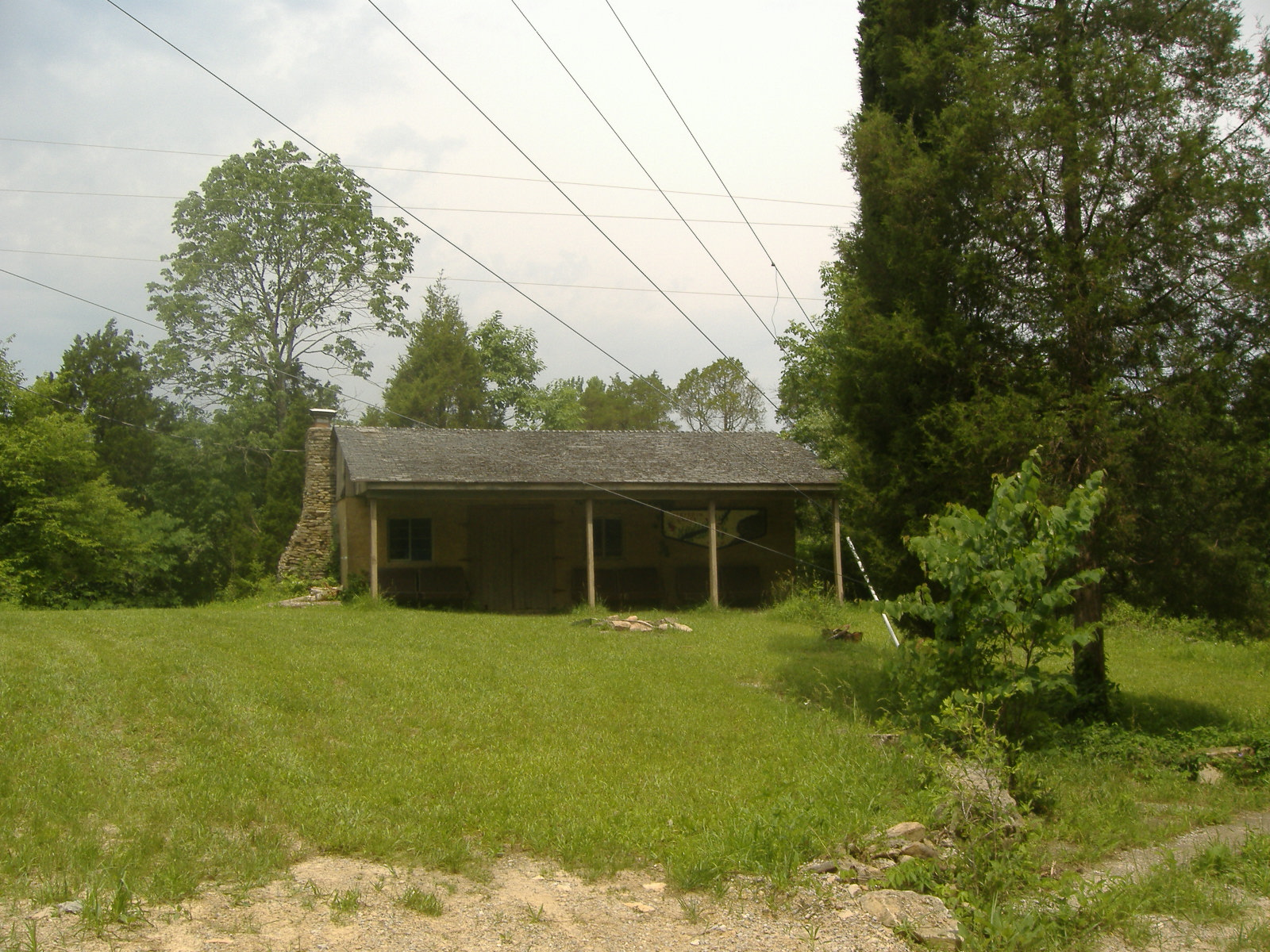
Order of the Arrow lodge

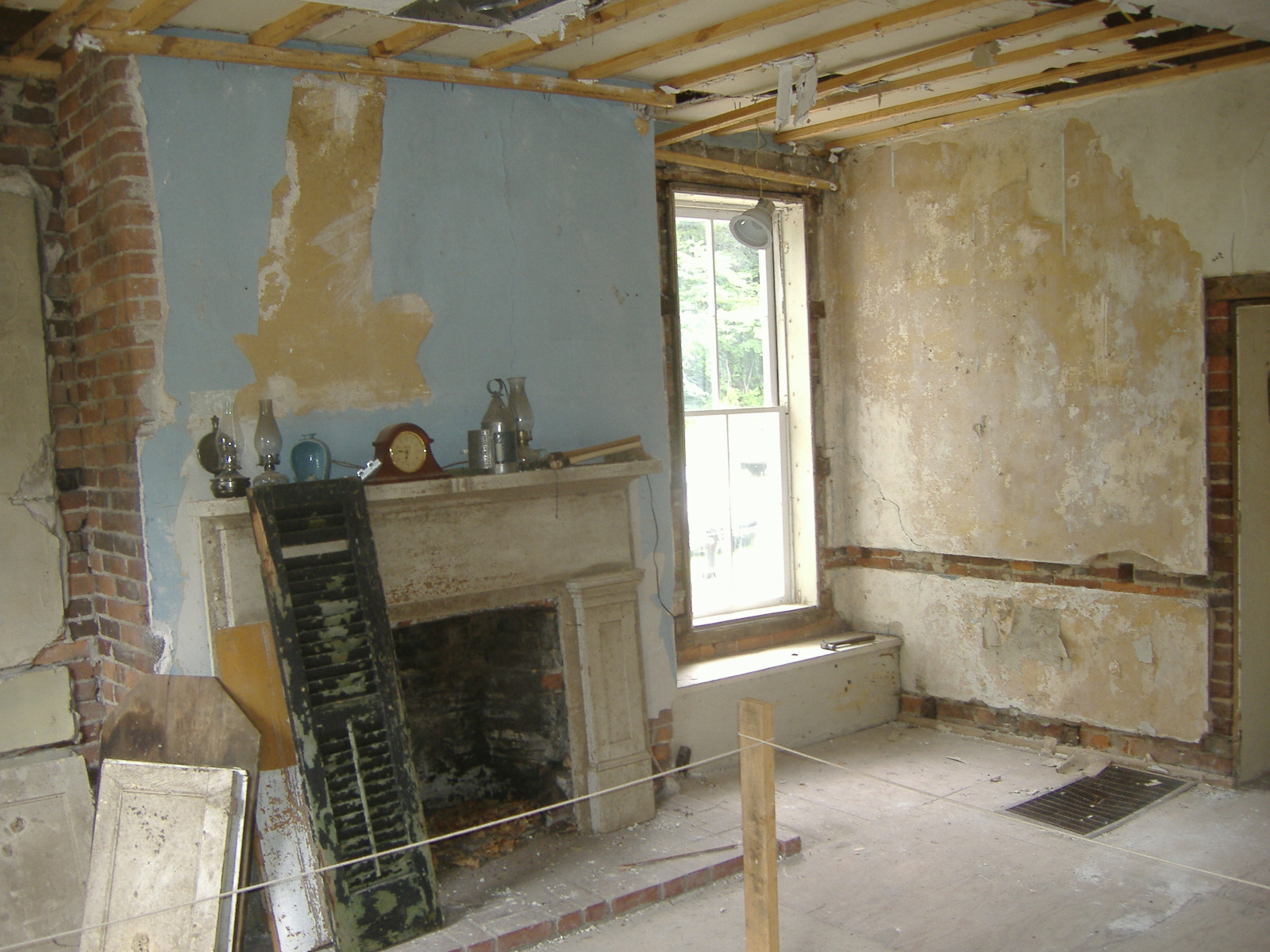
Inside of the John Work House near beginning of restoration

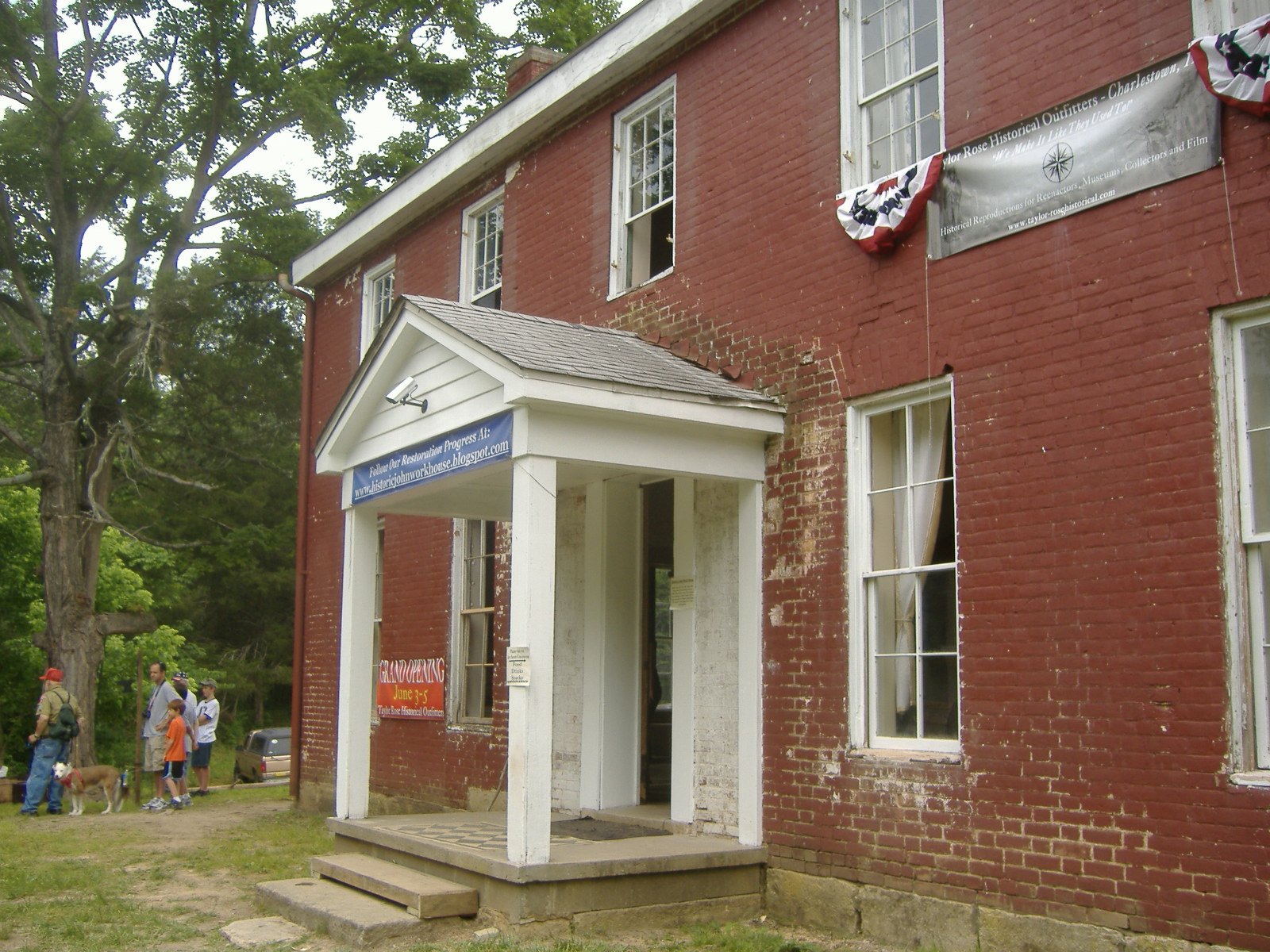
Entry to the house

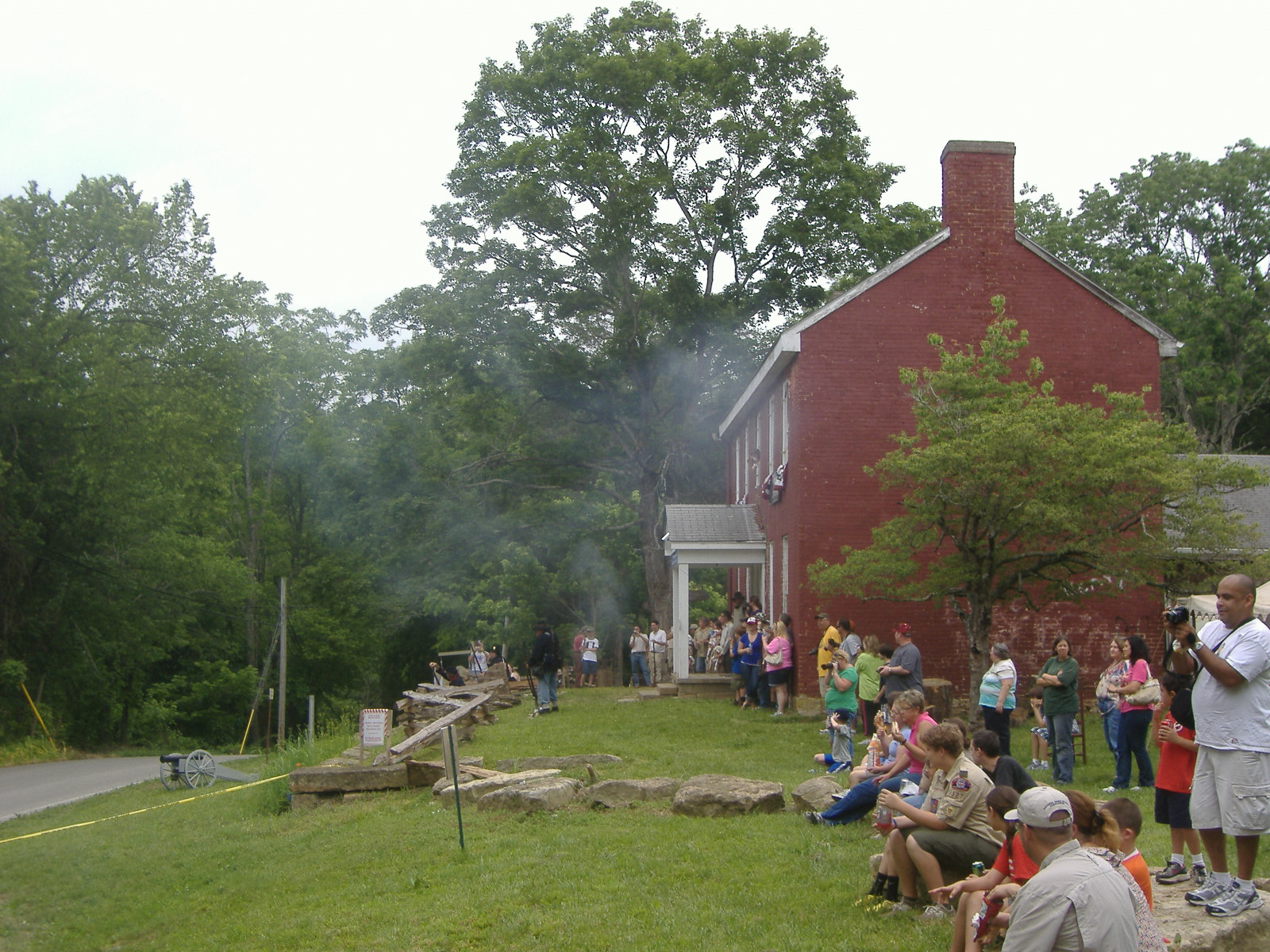
American Civil War hypothetical battle near the house

== Bibliography ==
- Baird, Lewis C. (1909). Baird's History of Clark County, Indiana. Windmill Publications.
- Kramer, Carl (2007). This Place We Call Home. Indiana University Press. ISBN 978-0-253-34850-0.
- Purlee, Gary D. (2005). Tunnel Mill: the story of an historical grist mill and an historic Boy Scout camp. Sunnyside Press. ISBN 0-9742566-9-2.
