= Booker's =

Bourbon produced by the Jim Beam distillery

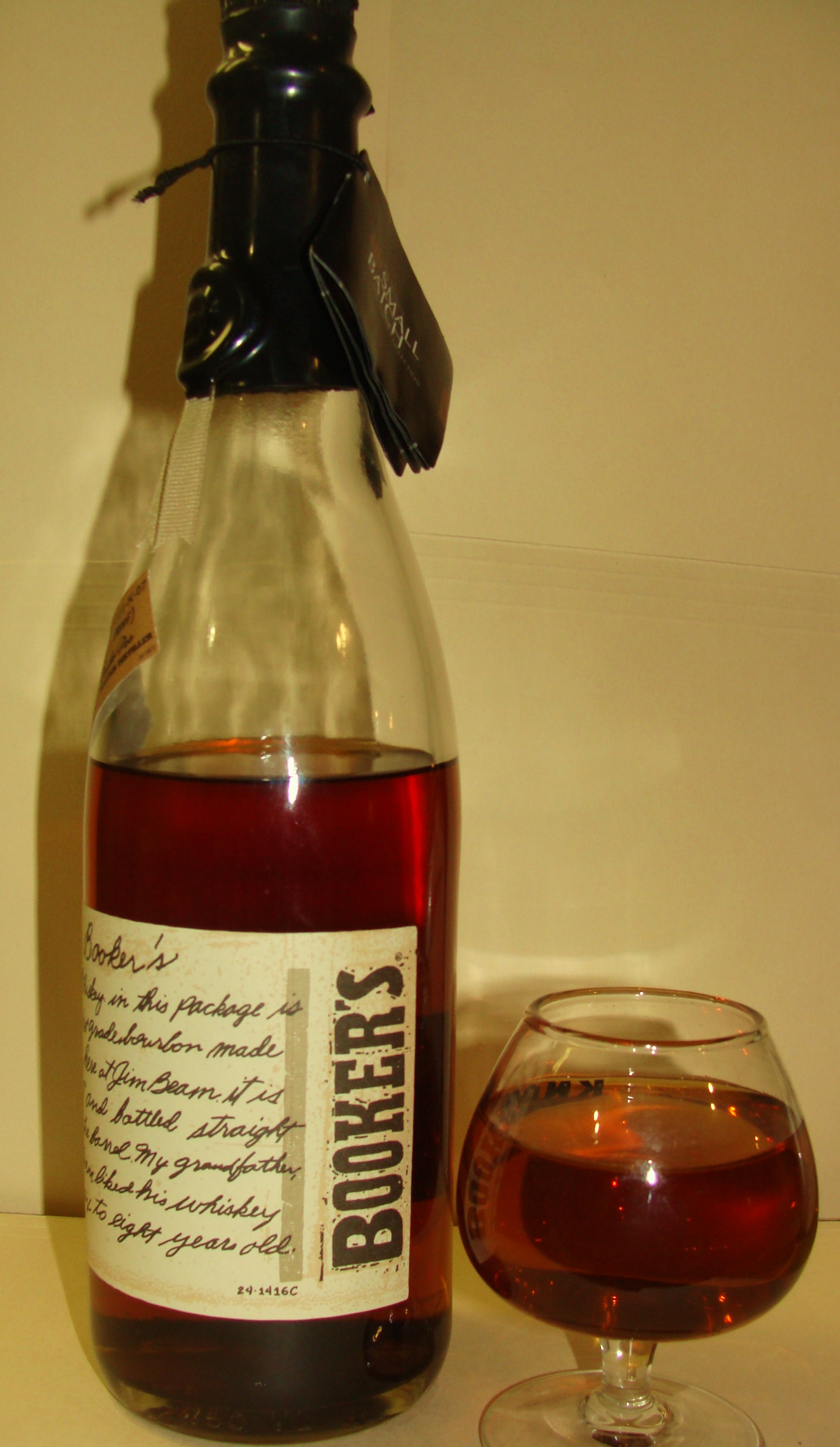
- Type: Bourbon whiskey
- Manufacturer: Suntory Global Spirits
- Country of origin: Kentucky, United States
- Introduced: 1988
- Alcohol by volume: 60.5–65.30%
- Proof (US): 121–130.6
- Related products: Jim Beam

Booker's bourbon is one of the small batch bourbons produced by the Jim Beam distillery, which is owned by Suntory Global Spirits (a subsidiary of Suntory Holdings of Osaka, Japan). Having the highest alcohol content of the brands in the Jim Beam "Small Batch Bourbon Collection", it is a cask strength bourbon. Booker's bourbon is aged between six and eight years and is bottled un-cut and without chill filtering at its natural proof between 121 and 130.6.

The brand began as bottlings of bourbon personally selected from barrels by Jim Beam's grandson, the late distiller emeritus Booker Noe. Noe originally bottled his straight-from-the-barrel bourbon as gifts to close friends and family, and launched his selections as a brand available to the general public with a very small (1,000-case) release in 1988. Each barrel of Booker's bourbon was hand-selected by Noe and was aged at the center of the rickhouse, where the company says that the temperature and humidity are the most favorable for fine bourbons.

While it is not necessary to cut the bourbon with water, a splash or two of distilled water is recommended (by Booker Noe) to unlock some of the flavor.

== Roundtable Releases ==
Booker's Roundtable releases are selected by a panel of whiskey writers and the Master Distiller, Fred Noe.

Batch No.	Age	Proof
C07-B-7	7 years 2 months	130.8
2013-06	7 years 6 months	125.9
2014-06	7 years 2 months	127.7
2015-01 "Big Man, Small Batch"	7 years 2 months 16 Days	128.7
2015-02 "Dot's Batch"	7 years 0 months 18 Days	127.9
2015-03 “The Center Cut”	7 years 2 months	127.2
2015-04 "Oven Buster Batch"	6 years 5 months 20 Days	127.0
2015-05 "Maw Maw's Batch"	6 years 7 months 3 Days	128
2015-06 "Noe Secret"	6 years 8 months 7 Days	128.1
2016-01 "Booker's Bluegrass"	6 years 11 months	127.9
2016-02 "Annis' Answer"	6 years 2 months 1 day	126.7
2016-03 “Toogie's Invitation”	6 years 4 months	129
2016-04 “Bluegill Creek”	6 years 5 months	128
2016-05 “Off Your Rocker”	6 years 7 months	129.7
2016-06 “Noe Hard Times”	6 years 10 months 1 day	127.8
2017-01 “Tommy’s Batch”	6 years 4 months 6 days	128.5
2017-02 "Blue Knights Batch"	6 years 3 months 3 days	127.4
2017-03 “Front Porch Batch”	6 years 5 months 25 days	125.9
2017-04 “Sip Awhile”	6 years 8 months 14 days	128.1
2018-01 “Kathleen's Batch”	6 years 3 months 14 days	127.4
2018-02 “Backyard BBQ”	6 years 2 months 10 days	128.8
2018-03 “Kentucky Chew”	6 years 4 months 12 days	126.7
2018-04 “Kitchen Table”	6 years 8 months 7 days	128.0
2019-01 "Teresa's Batch"	6 years 3 months 1 day	125.9
2019-02 "Shiny Barrel Batch"	6 years 5 months 1 day	124
2019-03 "Booker's Country Ham"	6 years 4 months 2 days	124.7
2019-04 "Beaten Biscuits"	6 years 6 months 19 days	126.1
2020-01 "Granny's Batch"	6 years 4 months 21 days	126.4
2020-02 "Boston Batch"	6 years 3 months 10 days	126.5
2020-03 "Pigskin Batch"	6 years 7 months 7 days	127.3
2020-04 "Noe Strangers Batch"	Scheduled but not released (See 2021–04)	
2021-01 "Donahoe's Batch"	6 years 11 months 4 days	125.3
2021-02 "Tagalong Batch"	6 years 5 months 0 days	127.9
2021-03 "Bardstown Batch"	6 years 5 months 0 days	125.5
2021-04 "Noe Strangers Batch"	6 years 6 months 12 days	124.4
2022-01 "Ronnie's Batch"	6 years 11 months 22 days	124.3
2022-02 "The Lumberyard Batch"	7 years 1 months 7 days	124.8
2022-03 "Kentucky Tea Batch"	7 years 4 months 14 days	126.5
2022-04 "Pinkie's Batch"	6 years 10 months 10 days	122.4
2023-01 "Charlie's Batch"	7 years 1 months 8 days	126.6
2023-02 "Apprentice Batch"	7 years 1 months 2 days	125.5
2023-03 "Mighty Fine Batch"	7 years 1 months 10 days	126.6
2023-04 "Storyteller Batch"	7 years 2 months 29 days	127.8
2024-01 "Springfield Batch"	7 years 7 months 8 days	124.5
2024-02 "Beam House Batch"	7 years 2 months 29 days	127.8

== Limited Edition Releases ==
In February 2014, Jim Beam announced that a limited edition Booker's 25th Anniversary Bourbon would be released. Booker's Batch 2014-01 is a blend of bourbons aged 10 years and 3 months, bottled at 130.8 proof, with a MSRP of $100. Only about 1000 cases of the special edition were released. Each bottle of Booker's 25th is topped with a special rose gold wax and is packaged in unique wooden boxes. Per Fred Noe, Booker's son and current Jim Beam Master Distiller, "These barrels were laid down in January 2003. Dad passed in February 2004, so I guess essentially you could say that these are some of the last barrels that dad produced before he passed away."

In February 2016, Jim Beam announced that a limited edition Booker's Rye would be released. Batch 2016-LE "Big Time Batch" was released in June 2016 and was aged 13 years, 1 month, and 12 days. This Kentucky Straight Rye Whiskey was bottled at 136.2 proof and carried a MSRP of $299. A special green wax topped the bottles while a green and gold label adorned the front. The Limited Edition stickers were hand numbered.

In December 2018, Jim Beam announced that a limited edition Booker's 30th Anniversary Bourbon would be released. It is a blend of 70% 9 year old whiskey and 30% 16 year old whiskey, bottled at 125.8 proof, with a MSRP of $199. Each bottle of Booker's 30th Anniversary is topped with a special silver wax and packaged in unique boxes made of reclaimed wood from Jim Beam's post-prohibition Warehouse E. Booker's 30th Anniversary is unique in that master distiller Fred Noe made almost all of the decisions for this bottling, instead of using the Roundtable committee.

Name/Batch No.	Age	Proof	Wax
2014-01 "Booker's 25th Anniversary"	10 years 3 months	130.8	Rose Gold
2016-LE "Big Time Batch" Rye	13 years 1 month 12 days	136.2	Green
Booker's 30th Anniversary	16 years & 9 years	125.8	Silver
Booker's Second Chance Batch	7 years 6 months 17 days	123.6	Blue

== Ratings and reviews ==
Booker's has won some tasting accolades, including a score of 95 from Wine Enthusiast in 2014. In Fall 2014, ratings aggregator Proof66 put Booker's in the Top 90th percentile of all whiskies. In 2017, Food & Wine Magazine named Booker's #2 in its list of “The 25 Most Important Bourbons Ever Made.”

Food critic Morgan Murphy said "The dark reddish brown liquid packs a serious punch with its high proof. But the robust, sweet, smooth flavor and cedar notes makes Booker's a favorite."

In December 2016, citing scarcity and demand, Beam Suntory announced a reduction in new batch releases and a large increase in the recommended retail price that would take effect in 2017. The price hike upset longtime fans of the brand, attracted criticism in whiskey news media and on social media. In January 2017, the company changed course and announced the price increase would instead take place over the course of several years.
