= Clermont, Kentucky =

Unincorporated community in Kentucky, United States

Coordinates: 37.9292°N 85.6535°W

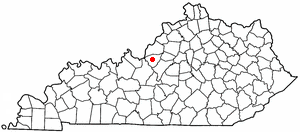
Location of Clermont, Kentucky

Clermont is a USGS-designated populated place (one of 32) in Bullitt County, Kentucky, United States, south of Louisville. It is an unincorporated community.

== Geography ==
Clermont is located at (37.9292, -85.6535) and is 531 feet (162 meters) above sea level. This is in the Eastern Time Zone (Standard Time: GMT -5 hours, DST: GMT -4 hours), ZIP code 40110.

A large portion of Clermont consists of the Bernheim Arboretum and Research Forest.

== Culture ==
Clermont is home to the famous Jim Beam distillery, and Bullitt County is a "wet" county.

The Boy Scouts of America Camp Crooked Creek, which is associated with the Lincoln Heritage Council, is also located in Clermont.

== History ==
The area was officially recognized by the USGS on September 20, 1979, during the rapid expansion of Shepherdsville due to the development of Interstate 65.
