= Taketsuru =

Taketsuru (written: 竹鶴) is a Japanese surname. Notable people with the surname include:

- Masataka Taketsuru (竹鶴 政孝, 1894–1979), Japanese businessman
- Rita Taketsuru (竹鶴 リタ, 1896–1961), Scottish businesswoman
- Takeshi Taketsuru (竹鶴 威, 1924–2014), Japanese businessman
