= Saji =

Saji may refer to:

- Saji, Tottori, a Japanese village
- Saji Observatory, an astronomical observatory in Japan
- 8738 Saji, a main-belt asteroid, named after the Japanese Saji Observatory

== People ==
- Alia Al-Saji, associate professor of philosophy at McGill University, Canada
- Keizo Saji (1919–1999), Japanese businessman and art patron
- Nobutada Saji (born 1945), Japanese businessman
- Saji Kazunari (1569–1634), Japanese samurai warrior
- Saji Paravoor (aka Sanjeev N. R), Indian Malayalam film director
- Saji Surendran, Indian film director in Malayalam films
- Saji Thomas (fl. 2018), Indian rower
