= Masataka Taketsuru =

Japanese businessman (1894–1979)

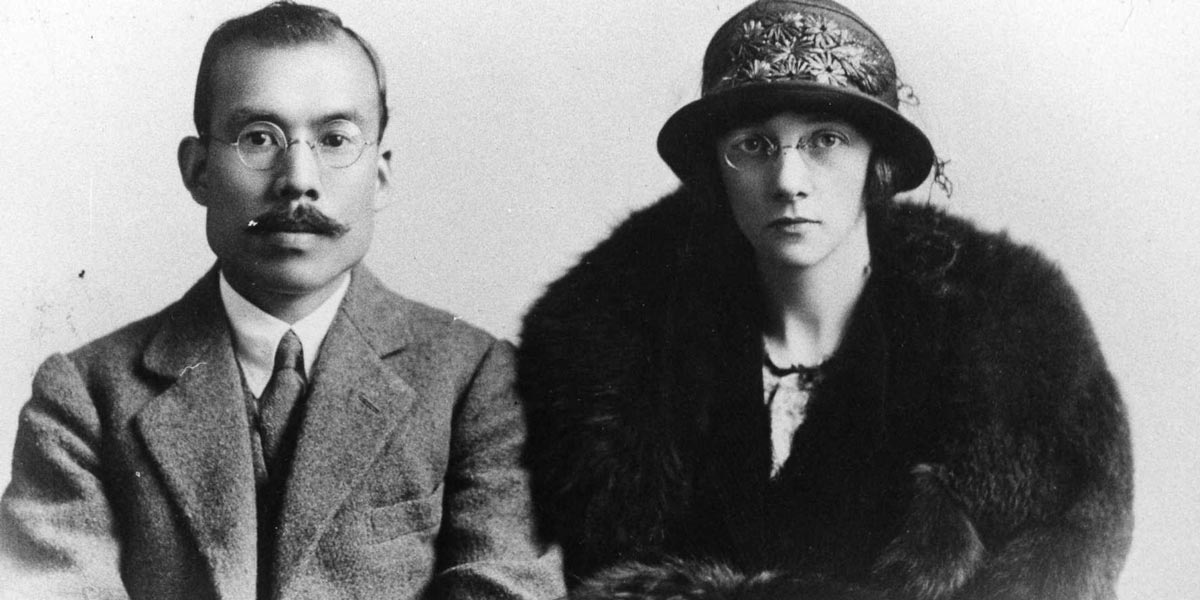
- Masataka Taketsuru and his wife Rita
- Born: 竹鶴 政孝 たけつる まさたか; 20 June 1894; Takehara, Hiroshima, Japan
- Died: 29 August 1979 (aged 85); Bunkyō, Tokyo, Japan
- Citizenship: Japanese
- Education: University of Glasgow; Osaka University
- Known for: Founder of Nikka Whisky
- Spouse: Jessie Roberta Cowan (m. 1920; died 1961)

Masataka Taketsuru (竹鶴 政孝, Taketsuru Masataka; 20 June 1894 – 29 August 1979) was a Japanese chemist and businessman who helped establish whisky production in Japan and founded Nikka Whisky Distilling.

Born to a family that had owned a sake brewery since 1733, he traveled to Scotland in 1918 to study organic chemistry and distilling. After graduating, Taketsuru joined Settsu Shuzō, a prominent Japanese liquor company founded in the early 1900s, known for producing alcohol including whisky.

With a plan to make Japanese whisky, Settsu Shuzo had sent him to Scotland to study the art of whisky production. He then returned to Japan, where he worked at Kotobukiya (later Suntory) and helped establish Japan’s first commercial whisky distillery at Yamazaki under founder Shinjiro Torii. In 1934, he founded his own company, Dai Nippon Kaju Co., Ltd., initially producing fruit juice in Hokkaido before beginning whisky production; the company later became known as Nikka Whisky from a contraction of the juice company name.

== Early life and education ==
Taketsuru was born in Takehara, Hiroshima into a family associated with Taketsuru Shuzō, a sake brewery which dates back to at least 1733 and is part of the traditional brewing culture of Takehara in Hiroshima Prefecture. He studied brewing and chemistry (later linked to what is now Osaka University), and joined Settsu Shuzō as the company began planning domestic whisky production. His family’s sake brewery, Taketsuru Shuzō, dated back to at least 1733 and was part of the traditional brewing culture of Takehara in Hiroshima Prefecture.

After graduating, Taketsuru joined Settsu Shuzō, a prominent Japanese liquor company founded in the early 1900s, known for producing alcohol including whisky. With a plan to make Japanese whisky, Settsu Shuzō sent him to Scotland in 1918 to study the art of whisky production.

== Experiences in Scotland (1918–1920) ==
In December 1918, he arrived in Scotland and enrolled at the University of Glasgow, where he studied organic chemistry in the summer of 1919. Taketsuru studied under Thomas Stewart Patterson, the Gardiner Chair of Chemistry. In April 1919, Taketsuru began his apprenticeship at Longmorn distillery in Strathspey, Scotland, and then in July at James Calder & Co.'s Bo'ness distillery in the Lowlands region. On 8 January 1920, he married Jessie Roberta "Rita" Cowan of Middlecroft, Kirkintilloch, despite opposition from both their families. They married in order to be together for his apprenticeship that began later that year in Campbeltown at Hazelburn distillery (purchased in 1920 by Mackie & Co., then owners of Springbank) before moving to Japan in November 1920 via New York and Seattle.

== Return to Japan and early whisky making ==
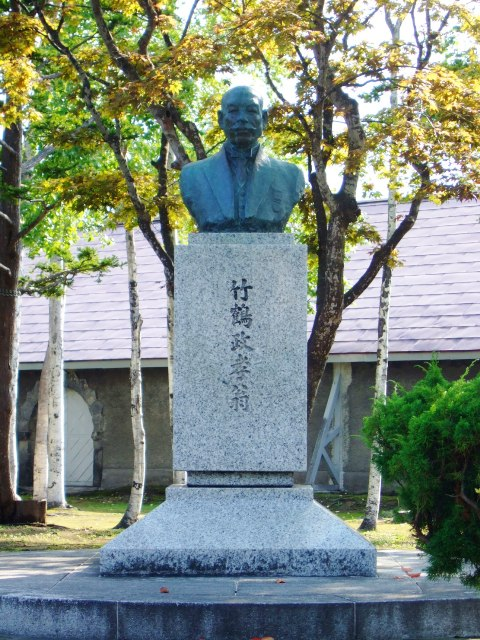
Bust of Masataka Taketsuru in Yoichi, Hokkaido

After returning to Japan in 1920, Taketsuru worked for Settsu Shuzō, a prominent Japanese liquor company that planned to produce an authentic domestic whisky. His early whisky plans were quashed when his Settsu Shozō changed direction and moved away from whiskey production. From there he joined Kotobukiya (later Suntory).

Kotobukiya Co., Ltd. (寿屋) was the predecessor of Suntory, founded in 1921 by Shinjiro Torii as a producer and seller of Western-style alcoholic beverages in Japan; the company later changed its name to Suntory in 1963. At Kotobukiya (which became Suntory), he helped establish the Yamazaki Distillery, the country’s first commercial whisky distillery.

At Kotobukiya, according to Nikka’s corporate history, Taketsuru oversaw construction at the famed Yamazaki distillery, the country’s first commercial malt whisky distillery just outside of Osaka, based on his Scottish experience. The distillery was completed in November 1924.

== Founding of Nikka Whisky ==
In 1934, Taketsuru left Kotobukiya and established Dai Nippon Kaju Co., Ltd. (the predecessor of Nikka Whisky) in Yoichi, Hokkaido. The company was named Dai Nippon Kaju Co., Ltd. ("Great Japan Fruit Juice"), reflecting its initial focus on fruit products before whisky production began. Nikka’s official timeline dates the company’s founding to 2 July 1934 and notes that Yoichi Distillery construction was completed later that year; Nikka began manufacturing whisky and brandy in 1936, and launched its first whisky in 1940.

Taketsuru chose Yoichi, Hokkaido for its cool climate and natural conditions which reminded him of the Scotland he loved, and which he was convinced were necessary for making Scotch whisky in the Highland style. He was adamant about making whiskey that could compete that from Scotland even though there was early resistance from consumers not yet accustomed the heavier style.

== Later life ==
In the years following its founding, Masataka Taketsuru served as president of Dai Nippon Kaju (later Nikka Whisky), officially holding that position from 1943. Following the deaths of Masataka Taketsuru in 1979 and his wife Rita in 1961, leadership of Nikka was eventually assumed by their adopted son, Takeshi Taketsuru, who became the company’s fifth president in 1985. Under Takeshi Taketsuru’s leadership, Nikka expanded its whisky production and strengthened its domestic and international presence as a major Japanese spirits producer.

== Legacy ==
Taketsuru is a key figure in the development of Japanese whisky, with his Glasgow training often cited as foundational to his later work in Japan.His commitment to "authentic" Scotch-style whiskey never wavered. One result being that in 2008, Yoichi Single Malt 1987 was named the world's best single malt whisky at the World Whiskies Awards, the first of many such accolades.

His life and marriage inspired the NHK morning drama Massan (broadcast 29 September 2014 – 28 March 2015).

== See also ==
- Nikka Whisky Distilling
- Japanese whisky
- Miyagikyo distillery
- Asahi Group Holdings
- Ben Nevis distillery
- Campbeltown single malts
- Keizo Saji
- Shinjirō Torii
