= Yamazaki distillery =

Japanese whisky distillery in Shimamoto, Osaka

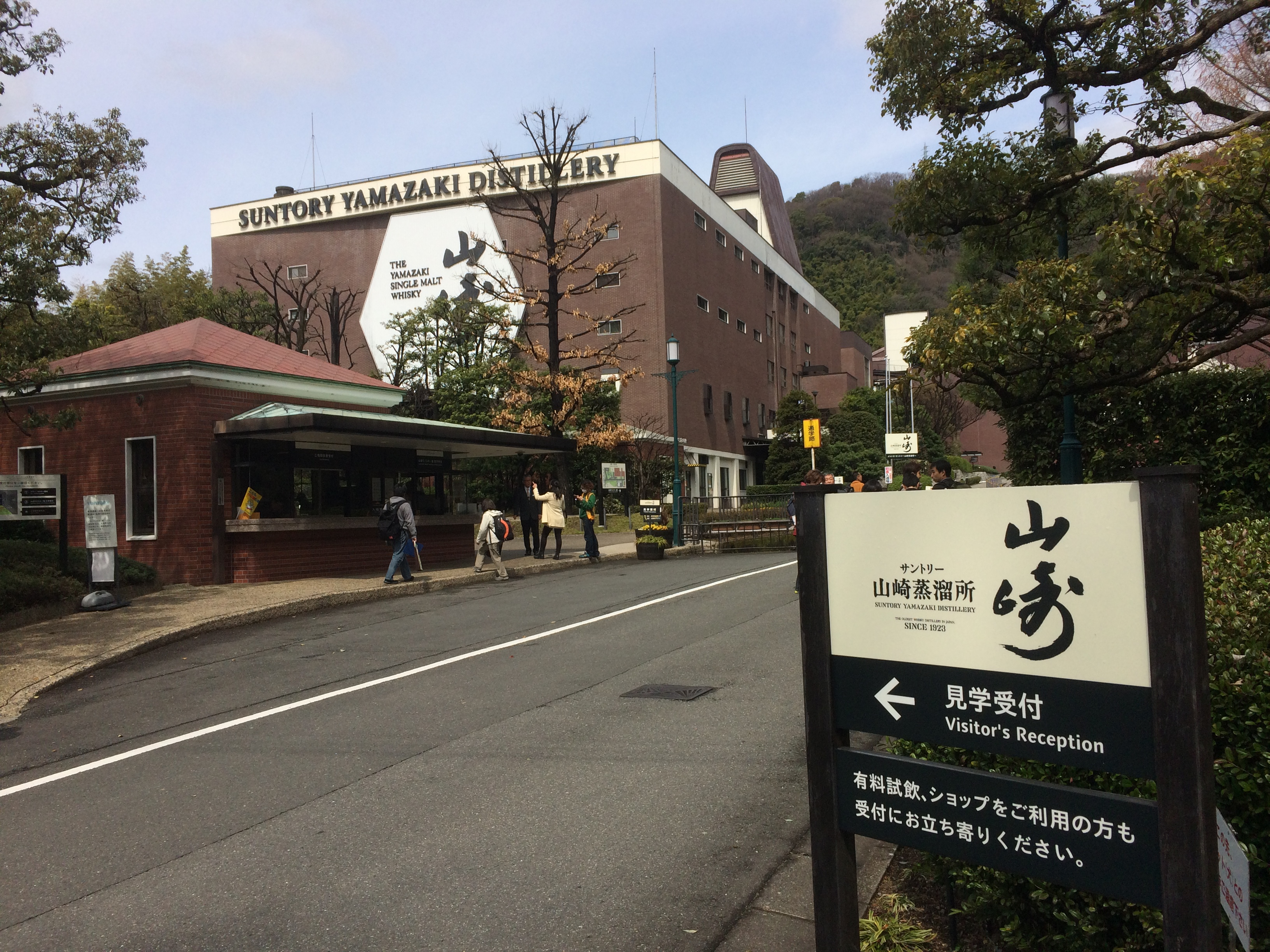
- Suntory Yamazaki distillery

Region: Japan
- Location: Yamazaki 5-2-1, Shimamoto-cho, Mishima-gun, Osaka, 618-0001; Japan
- Coordinates: 34°53′35.5″N 135°40′28.4″E
- Owner: Suntory
- Founded: 1923
- Founder: Shinjirō Torii
- Status: Active
- No. of stills: 6 wash stills; 6 spirit stills
- Website: Suntory Yamazaki Distillery

Yamazaki distillery (Japanese: 山崎蒸溜所, Hepburn: Yamazaki jōryūsho) is a Japanese whisky distillery located in Shimamoto, Osaka Prefecture, Japan. Opened in 1923, and owned by Suntory, it was Japan's first commercial whisky distillery. Seven thousand bottles of unblended malt whisky are on display in its "Whisky Library".

== History ==
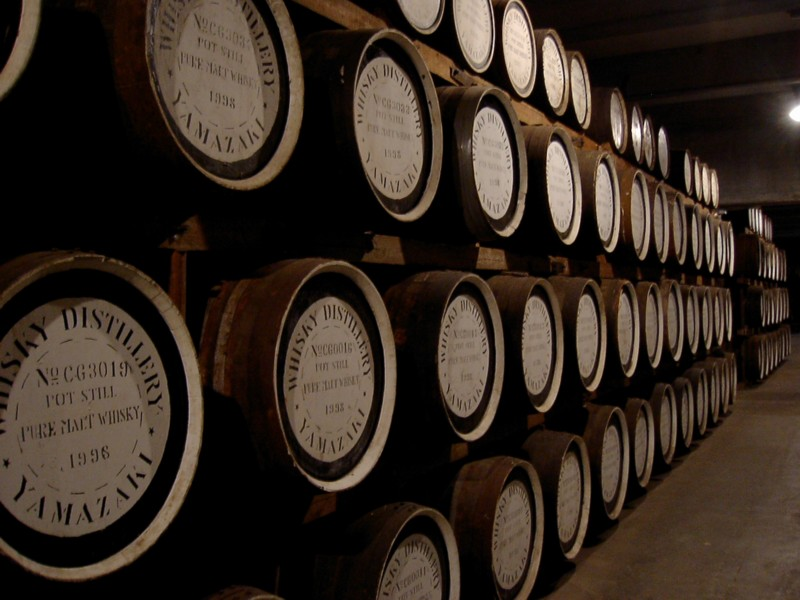
Wooden barrels of Mizunara (Japanese oak) at the Yamazaki distillery

The Yamazaki distillery was opened in 1923 by Shinjirō Torii (鳥井 信治郎) as the first malt whisky distillery in Japan. The company founder and chairman of Kotobukiya (the predecessor company of Suntory) wanted to produce a serious whisky and therefore hired Taketsuru Masataka (竹鶴 政孝), whom he appointed factory director of the Yamazaki distillery in 1924. This descendant of a sake brewing family from the 17th century was in Scotland in 1918. He traveled to study at Glasgow University and learned how to make Scotch whisky on site. He married a Scottish girl, Jessie Roberta "Rita" Cowan († 1961), who went to Japan with him in 1920. Under Taketsuru (* 1894) the production of the first whisky was completed in 1929, which was sold as shirofuda (白札, English white label). Due to differences with Torii, Taketsuru left the company in 1934 and founded the Dai-Nippon Kaju KK company, later called Nikka Whisky Distilling, in Hokkaidō in the same year.

== Styles of whisky ==
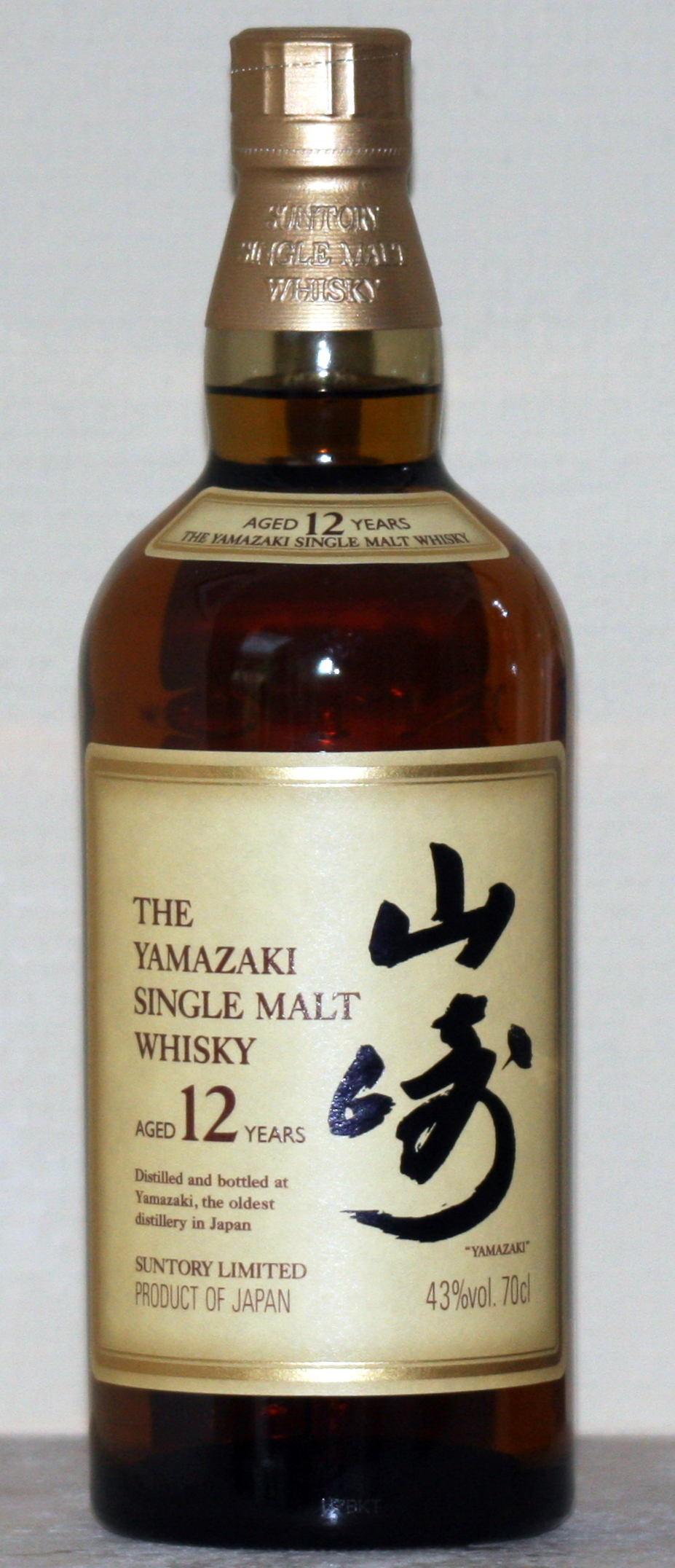
Single malt Yamazaki aged 12 years

There are four primary variants of Yamazaki whisky:

- Yamazaki Single Malt Distiller's Reserve whisky
- Yamazaki Single Malt 12-Year-Old whisky
- Yamazaki Single Malt 18-Year-Old whisky
- Yamazaki Single Malt 25-Year-Old whisky

There are also other offerings outside of the US such as the 10-, 25-, 35- and 50-year-old whiskies. Some offerings are dated vintages such as 1980, 1984, 1993, and there are also Puncheon and sherry offerings.

== Evaluation ==
Spirit ratings organizations, such as the Beverage Testing Institute and the San Francisco World Spirits Competitions, have reacted favorably to Yamazaki's offerings. Most notably, the 18-Year has earned six consecutive double gold medals at the San Francisco Spirits Competitions between 2008 and 2013. Ratings aggregator Proof66.com places the Yamazaki 18-Year in the 97th percentile among its rated whiskies.

Yamazaki 25 Year Old was awarded "Best Japanese Single Malt" at the 2013 World Whisky Awards. Jim Murray's Whisky Bible 2015 awarded Yamazaki Single Malt Sherry Cask 2013 the title of World Whisky of the Year.

== See also ==
- List of historic whisky distilleries
