= List of historic whisky distilleries =

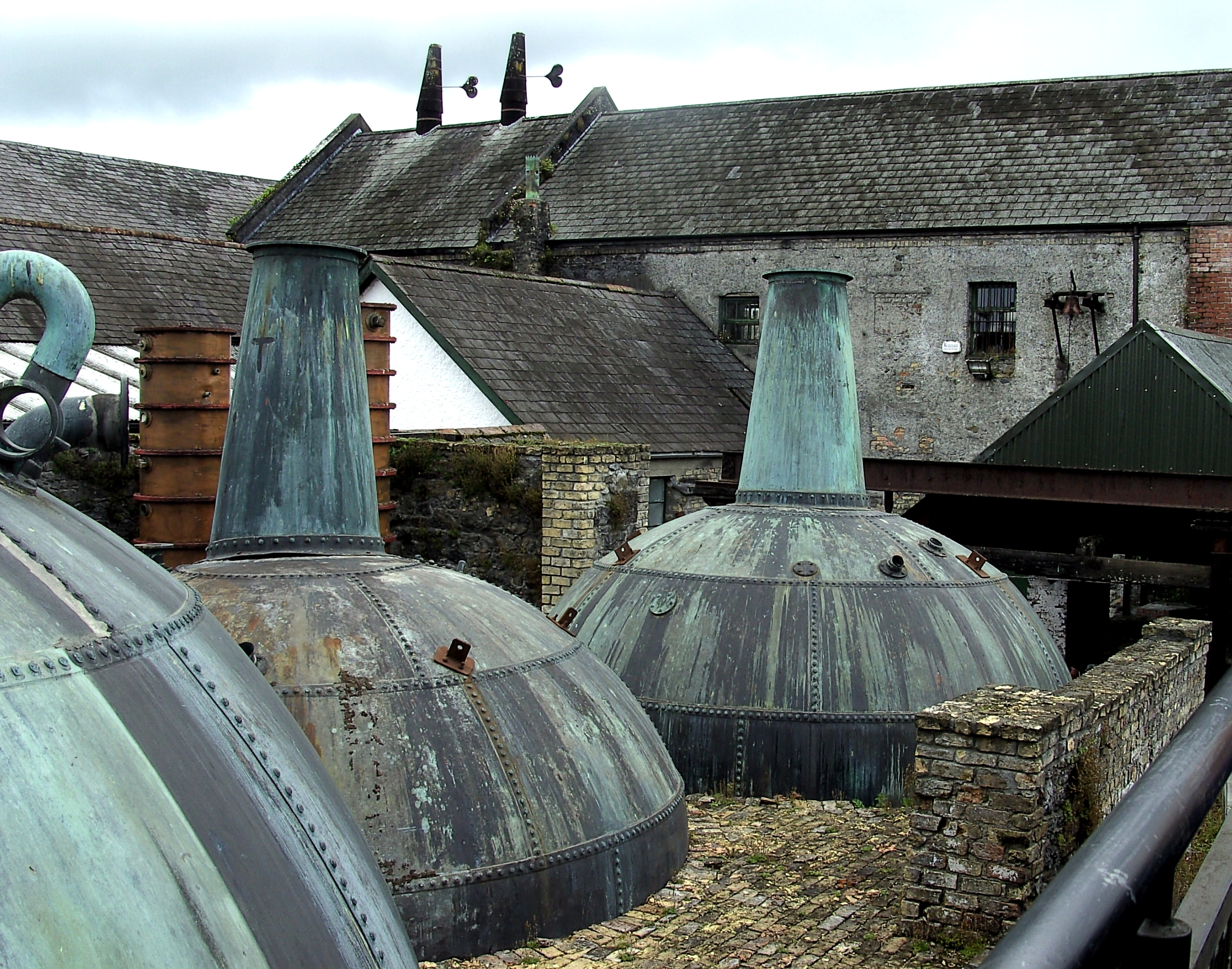
Whisky pots at Kilbeggan Distillery in Ireland

This article is a list of historic whisky distilleries and distillery companies. It includes some that are still operating and some that are not, and includes those claiming to be the oldest or to have other historically important characteristics.

== In Ireland ==
- Green Distillery (1796–1870s), notable for its use of an early continuous distillation apparatus, invented by the distillery's then co-owner, Joseph Shee
- Kilbeggan Distillery, formerly the Brusna Distillery and Locke's Distillery, claimed as the oldest licensed distillery, referencing a licence issued in 1757, although it was closed in 1954; production resumed at the site in 2007, but with different ownership and different production facilities, as all the equipment of the prior distillery had been sold off and destroyed during the closure (during which the site had been converted to pig farm and a construction equipment business)
- Old Bushmills Distillery, sometimes claimed to be the oldest, based on the notion of the oldest recorded grant of a licence to distil granted to someone in the area in 1608; the current Bushmills distillery site and company date to 1784; the distillery was rebuilt after a fire in 1885

== In Scotland ==
- Adelphi Distillery, in operation between approximately 1826 and 1907
- Ardbeg Distillery, producing whisky since 1798, began commercial production in 1815
- Bowmore Distillery, said to have been established in 1779
- Ballechin distillery, operated between 1810 and 1927
- Glen Garioch Distillery, dating to 1797
- Glenturret Distillery, officially established in 1775, but the distillery had previously been under the control of illicit distillers, who sought to avoid paying taxes to England, since 1717, leading to claims of being the oldest distillery in Scotland
- Hazelburn Distillery, in operation between approximately 1825 and 1925
- Littlemill Distillery, with dating traced to inscription 1772 on one of the warehouses and a record of a licence to distil issued in 1773, with more clear records starting in 1817, also one of the first distilleries to have a female licensee (Jane MacGregor in 1823); closed for the last time in 1994, dismantled in 1997, with the remnants destroyed in a fire in 2004
- Strathisla Distillery, formerly known as the Milltown Distillery, oldest distillery in the north of Scotland, with some history dating to 1786 and the 1820s, most well documented after a fire in 1876 or 1879

== In the United States ==
- A. Smith Bowman Distillery, founded in 1934, operated as the only legal distillery in post-Prohibition Virginia until the 1950s; closed and moved to a different location in 1988
- Atherton Whiskey was a pre-prohibition brand of Kentucky Straight Bourbon Whiskey first produced by J M Atherton & Co. First bottled and marketed in 1867, it was once the largest whiskey making operation in Kentucky
- Barton Distillery, originally established in 1879
- Bomberger's Distillery, later known as the Michter's Distillery, with some history to 1753; closed 1989, believed to be the oldest remaining distillery building in the United States
- Brown–Forman, a company established in 1870 with the novel idea of selling top-grade whiskey in sealed glass bottles, now one of the largest American-owned companies in the spirits and wine business
- Buffalo Trace Distillery, formerly known as the George T. Stagg Distillery and the Old Fire Copper (O.F.C.) Distillery, with some history to between 1775 and 1812
- Four Roses, a brand name claimed to date from the 1860s or 1888 with a distillery built in 1910
- George Washington's Distillery, established in 1797, the highest-capacity distillery in America at that time, reconstructed as an operating tourist attraction in 2007
- Heaven Hill Distilleries, founded in 1935 (owner of the New Bernheim Distillery, formerly the Beargrass Distillery DSP-KY-1, and the Heaven Hill Distillery DSP-KY-31), the only large family-owned distillery headquartered in Kentucky and the second-largest holder of bourbon whiskey inventory
- Jack Daniel's Distillery, originally established in 1875 (although claimed on the product label as "Est. & Reg. in 1866"), the oldest American distillery operating on the same site (with continuous ownership)
- James E. Pepper Distillery, originally the Henry Clay distillery (registered distillery DSP-KY-5), established around 1880, closed 1958, reopened under new ownership in 2008
- Jim Beam, a company that claims a distilling heritage to 1795, which re-entered the market in 1935 just after Prohibition, renaming the brand as Jim Beam in 1943
- Maker's Mark Distillery, formerly Burk's Distillery, established 1889
- McCormick Distilling Company, dating to 1856, the oldest distillery west of the Mississippi River that is operating at its original location
- Nelson's Green Brier Distillery, a distillery in Tennessee that operated from 1870 to 1909; the remnants were shipped to Canada in 1923 and used to create a distillery there for Seagram; the name of the distillery was reused for a new business launched in 2011
- Sazerac Company, a large privately owned distilling company that traces its history to a coffee house opened in 1850 that had become a bar by 1869
- Stitzel–Weller Distillery, founded in 1935, sold in 1972, and closed in 1992, produced notable brands and highly regarded whiskey including the stock used for Pappy Van Winkle's Family Reserve until 2013, reopened as the Bulleit Frontier Experience attraction for Bulleit Bourbon as part of the Kentucky Bourbon Trail
- Willett Distillery (DSP-KY-78), founded on a family farm in 1936, has had continuous family ownership and two successive female presidents (mother and daughter)
- Woodford Reserve Distillery, also known as Labrot & Graham, dating to about 1812

== In Canada ==
- Hiram Walker Distillery, founded in 1858 just across the Detroit River from Detroit in Windsor, Ontario, established there to avoid local Prohibition regulations in the Detroit area – heavily profited from the illicit trade during Prohibition in the United States
- Gooderham and Worts Limited, founded in 1832 in Toronto. It became one of the worlds largest distilleries. Merged with Hiram Walker Distillery (see above) in 1926. It was sold to Allied Lyons in 1987. Still produces whiskey in Windsor. It is responsible for the distillery district in Toronto.

== In Japan ==
- Yamazaki Distillery, the oldest commercial whiskey distillery in Japan, established in 1923 by Shinjiro Torii and Masataka Taketsuru of the Kotobukiya company, which was renamed Suntory in 1963
- Yoichi Distillery, established in 1934 by Masataka Taketsuru when founding the Nikka Whisky Distilling company

== In England ==
- Lea Valley Distillery, Stratford, Essex (established in the late 19th century)
- Bank Hall Distillery, Liverpool (Note: Not to be confused with current distilleries of the same name)
- Bristol Distillery, Bristol (established in the 17th century)
- Vauxhall Distillery in Vauxhall, Liverpool (established in 1781) – produced grain whisky

These whisky distilleries closed in the 19th century, with the Lea Valley distillery being the last to cease production.

== See also ==
- List of whisky brands
- Outline of whisky
