= Shinjirō Torii =

Japanese entrepreneur; founder of Suntory (1879–1962)

- 鳥井 信治郎
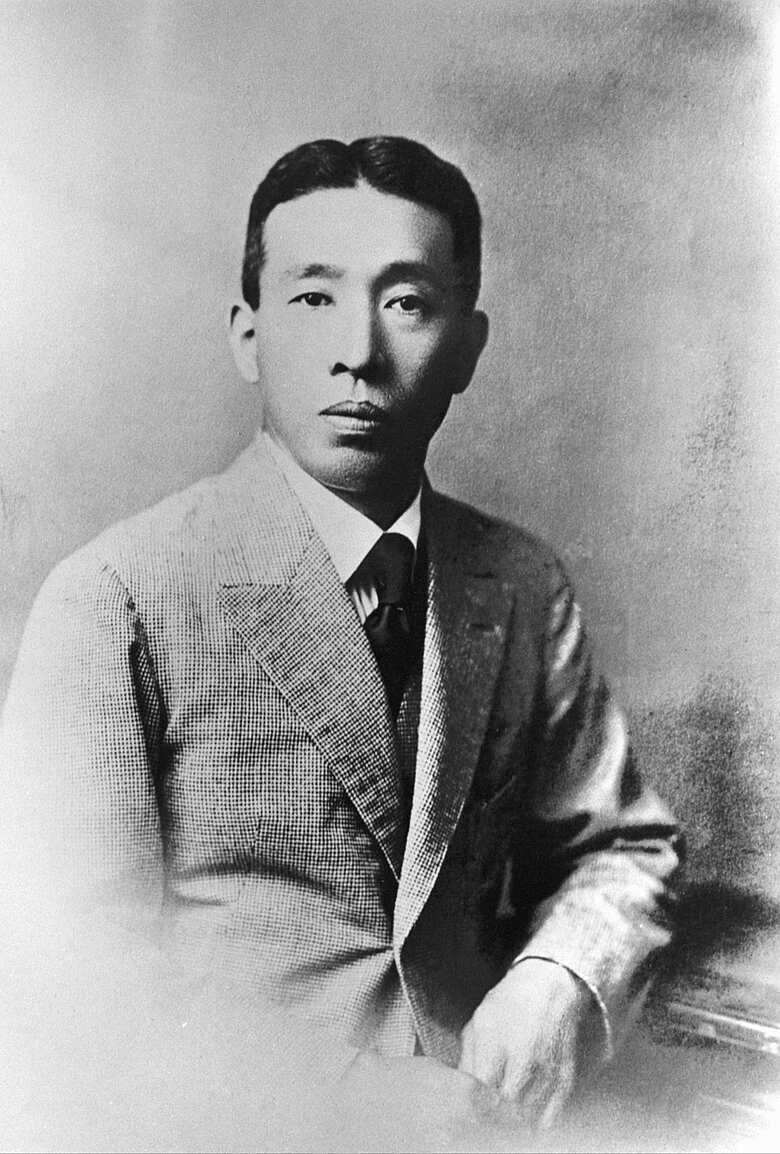
- Torii (photograph; see image page for licensing)
- Born: January 30, 1879; Osaka, Japan
- Died: February 20, 1962 (aged 83); Japan
- Occupation: Entrepreneur
- Known for: Founder of Suntory; early development of Japanese whisky at Yamazaki

Shinjirō Torii (鳥井 信治郎, Torii Shinjirō; 30 January 1879 – 20 February 1962) was a Japanese entrepreneur who founded the business that became Suntory. He began as an importer and seller of Western-style alcoholic beverages and later led early domestic whisky production efforts, including the establishment of the Yamazaki distillery in 1923. He is remembered as a pioneer in Japan’s Western liquor industry.

== Early life ==
Torii entered Osaka Commercial School in 1890 and later joined Konishi Gisuke Shoten (later Konishi), where he learned blending techniques used in the era's imitation whiskies.

== Career ==
=== Torii Shoten and Akadama port wine ===
In 1899, Torii founded Torii Shoten in Osaka as an import and sales business for Western alcoholic drinks. In the early twentieth century he developed and marketed Akadama port wine, (often described in English-language business sources as a sweetened or fortified wine and later known under different labelling). The product became one of his best-known early successes.

=== Kotobukiya and whisky at Yamazaki ===
In 1921, Torii founded Kotobukiya Co., Ltd. (a predecessor of Suntory). In 1923 he established the Yamazaki distillery, widely described by the company as Japan's first and oldest malt whisky distillery, as part of his ambition to create whisky suited to Japanese tastes. Masataka Taketsuru, who later founded Nikka Whisky Distilling, was employed by Torii and assisted with establishing whisky production at Yamazaki.

=== Business approach and branding ===
Business histories and later overviews commonly characterize Torii as emphasizing the adaptation of Western-style drinks to domestic tastes and consumption contexts—an approach visible in the company’s early wine products and subsequent whisky positioning.

=== Relationship to Masataka Taketsuru ===
Torii's early whisky project at Yamazaki is closely associated with Masataka Taketsuru, who was recruited to assist in building the distillery and later left to found his own whisky enterprise. The National Diet Library profile documents Taketsuru's involvement at Yamazaki and notes the 1929 release of Shirofuda (white label) whisky under Kotobukiya.

=== Death ===
Torii died on 20 February 1962.

== Family tree ==
TORII-SAJI (鳥井-佐治) Family Tree
CEO of Suntory

TANABE Shichibei (adopted by TANABE in 2nd Marriage); Sake brewer
TANABE Shichiroku; House of Representatives (1879-1952)	KOBAYASHI Ichizō; Founder Hankyu Railways (1873–1957)
MATSUOKA Tatsuo (KOBAYASHI); Toho Co. (1904-1974)	TORII Haruko (KOBAYASHI) (1912-2011)	Kichitarō Torii (1908-1940)
MATSUOKA Isao; Toho Co. (1934-)	TORII Shinichi; 3th Suntory CEO (wife: Masako) (1938–2004)
TORII Nobuhiro; 6th Suntory CEO (1966-)

TORII Chubei; Rice broker	TORII Koma (KOZAKI)
TORII Shinjiro; Founder of Suntory (1879–1962)	TORII Kuni (SAJI) (1887~1933)
SAJI Yoshiko (HIRAGA) (1927-1945)	SAJI Keizo (TORII); 2nd Suntory CEO (1919-1999)	SAJI Keiko (OHIRA) (1923- )	TORII Michio (wife: Junko) (1923-1995)
SAJI Nobutada; 4th Suntory CEO (1945- )	TSUTSUMI Harue (née SAJI) (1950- )	TSUTSUMI Tsuyoshi; President, Suntory Hall (1942- )	TORII Shingo; Master Blender (1953- )
SAJI Seizo (TSUTSUMI); Executive Director

== Honors and recognition ==
The National Diet Library profile records that Torii received the Order of the Rising Sun, Gold Rays with Neck Ribbon (Third Class).

== Legacy ==
Torii is frequently cited as a foundational figure in Japan’s Western-style drinks industry and in the early institutionalization of whisky production through the establishment of Yamazaki and related product development milestones. In overviews of Japanese whisky history, 1923 (Yamazaki's construction) is often treated as a benchmark date for the industry’s origin story. Suntory's corporate histories credit Torii's emphasis on craftsmanship (monozukuri) and ongoing challenge and experimentation as foundational to the company culture.

== See also ==
- Suntory
- Yamazaki distillery
- Japanese whisky
- Masataka Taketsuru
