= Franz Schalk Gold Medal =

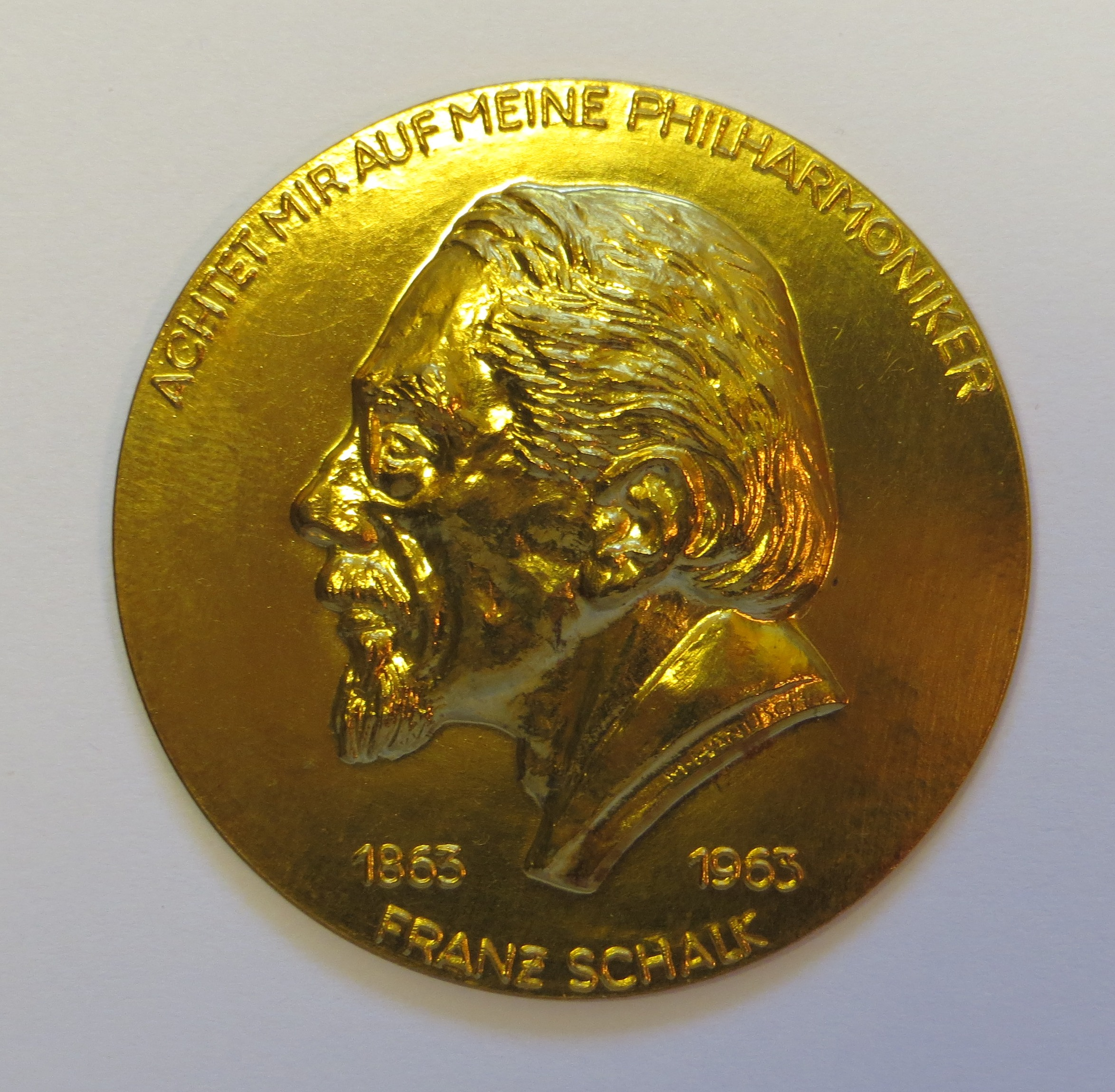
Franz Schalk Gold Medal

The Franz Schalk Gold Medal is a distinction of the Vienna Philharmonic awarded since 1963. It is named after the conductor, first director of the Vienna State Opera and co-founder of the Salzburg Festival Franz Schalk, whose 100th birthday was celebrated in 1963.

== Criteria and Motto ==
The medal is presented to persons who earned extraordinary merits in promoting the orchestra of Vienna Philharmonic. The motto of the award is Achtet mir auf meine Philharmoniker (en. Look after my philharmonic) - allegedly the last sentence of Franz Schalk.

== Recipients (selection) ==
The year specifications are the years of the awarding, not the year of the decision on the award.

- 1992: Christopher Raeburn, longtime record producer of Decca Records
- 1999: Keizo Saji, 2nd generation head of Suntory and primary benefactor of Suntory Hall
- 2002: Ioan Holender, Director of the Vienna State Opera from 1992 to 2010
- 2003: Franz Schausberger, Landeshauptmann of Salzburg 1996-2004
- 2003: Walter Cronkite, US-journalist
- 2005: Michael Häupl, Mayor of Vienna from 1994 to 2018
- 2016: Nobutada Saji, 3rd president of Suntory Hall
