= Ad Council Japan =

Japanese incorporated association based on the Ad Council of America

- Native name: 公益社団法人ACジャパン
- Romanized name: Kōeki Shadan Hōjin AC Japan
- Formerly: Japan Advertising Council (1971–2009)
- Type: Public
- Industry: Public Service Announcements
- Founded: 7 July 1971
- Founder: Keizo Saji
- Headquarters: Tokyo, Japan,
- Key people: Nobutada Saji, chairman
- Website: Advertising Council Japan

Advertising Council Japan (公益社団法人ACジャパン, Kōeki Shadan Hōjin AC Japan; Ad Council Japan, AC Japan), formerly named Japan Advertising Council (社団法人公共広告機構, Shadan Hōjin Kōkyō Kōkoku Kikō; Japan Ad Council) until 30 June 2009, is a private non-profit organization that distributes Japanese public service announcements on behalf of various sponsors, including both non-profit organizations and government agencies.

Like the US counterpart, the Ad Council (where the Ad Council Japan is modelled), Ad Council Japan generally does not produce public service advertisements itself; rather, it acts as a coordinator and distributor. Its advertising campaigns are divided into three; national campaign, regional campaign and aid campaign. The advertising campaigns are changed yearly in July, the month Ad Council Japan was founded. Ad Council Japan accepts requests from sponsor organizations for Japanese advertising campaigns that focus on particular social issues.

An issue must be non-partisan and have Asian and Japanese national or regional relevance. Ad Council Japan then assigns each campaign to a volunteer advertising agency that produces the actual advertisements. Finally, Ad Council Japan distributes the finished advertisements to media outlets. Some advertising campaigns only appear on a certain medium, such as on printed media only.

TV stations could also replace empty advertisement slots with those of Ad Council Japan if a company is willing to remove their advertisements from the station.

== History ==
Ad Council Japan was established on 7 July 1971 in Osaka, Japan as "Kansai Advertising Council (関西公共広告機構, Kansai Kōkyō Kōkoku Kikō)" by Keizo Saji, then chairman of Suntory, and had activities in the Kansai region. Then it was reorganised as the nationwide private organization named "Japan Advertising Council (社団法人公共広告機構, Shadan Hōjin Kōkyō Kōkoku Kikō)" in 1974, and then renamed to the present name on 1 July 2009.

AC Japan's headquarters are located in Chuo, Tokyo since July 2011. It has branch offices in Sapporo, Sendai, Nagoya, Osaka (formerly the AC Japan's headquarters since its establishment), Hiroshima, Fukuoka, and Naha.

During the TV coverage of the 2011 Tōhoku earthquake and tsunami events, the vast majority of advertisers withdrew their advertising, resulting in a massive increase in filler advertisements by AC Japan, many of which promoted traditional Japanese virtues, such as mutual help (giri, on, amae) and the importance of greetings.

== See also ==
- Ad Council, equivalent non-profit in the United States
- Promotion
- Television commercial
