= Suntory Museum of Art =

Art museum in Tokyo, Japan

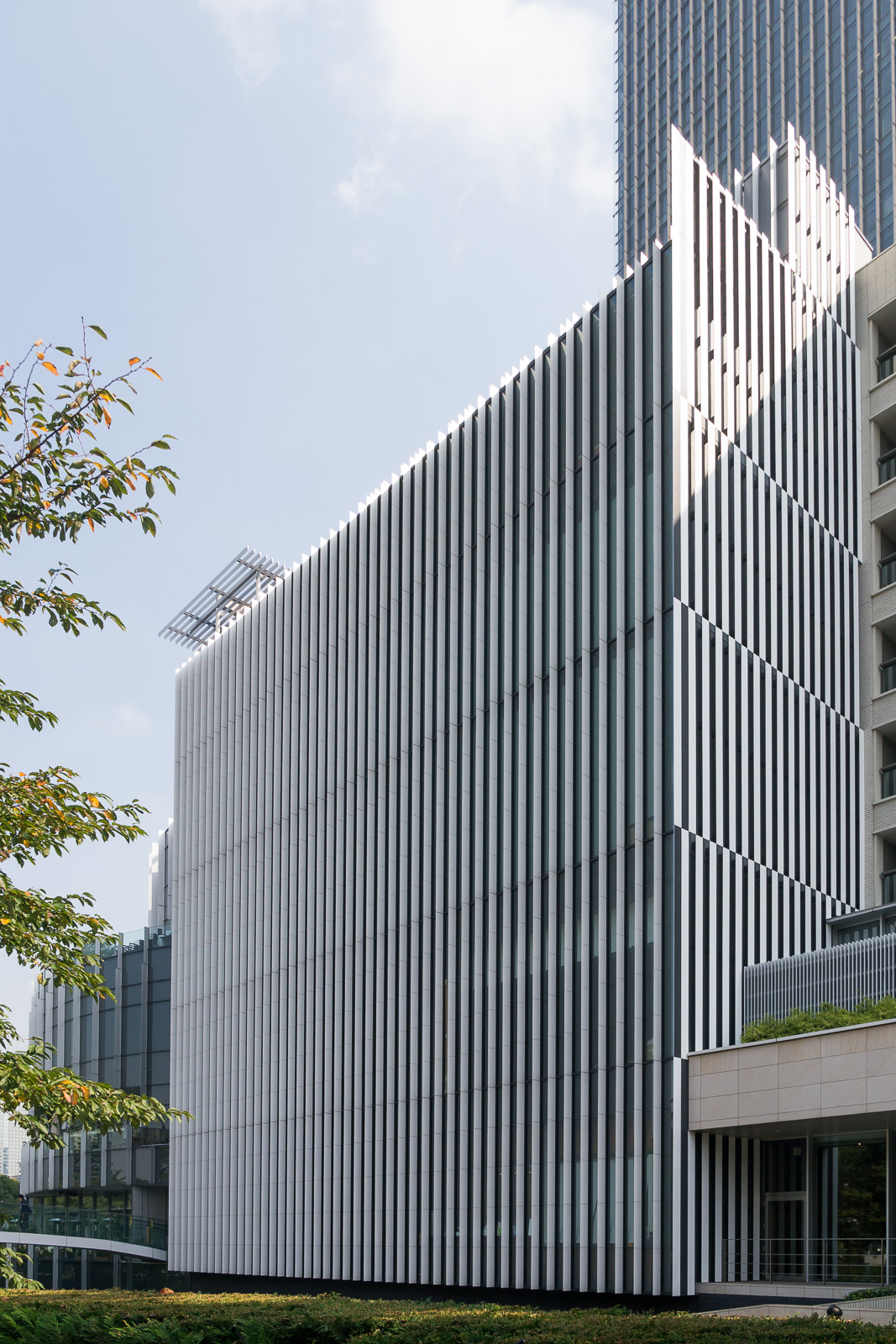
- Suntory Museum of Art in 2012
- Interactive fullscreen map
- Location: Tokyo, Japan
- Coordinates: 35°39′59″N 139°43′49″E

The Suntory Museum of Art (サントリー 美術館, Santorī Bijutsukan) is an arts museum located in Tokyo Midtown, Roppongi, Tokyo. It is owned by the Suntory corporation. The collection theme of the art works is "Art in life" and they mainly have Japanese antiques. The museum houses more than 3,000 cultural objects, one of which have been designated by the Japanese government as National Treasures, 16 as Important Cultural Properties, and 21 as Important Art Objects.

== History ==
In 1961, Suntory President Keizo Saji opened the Suntory Museum in the Palace Building in Marunouchi, Chiyoda, Tokyo with the theme of "Art in life". The museum started with no permanent collection. At the time, Mr Keizo stated that, contrary to other museums, "Artworks are currently at zero" and that "Hoping that people will value the spirit of the beautiful culture of art in life that our ancestors created, I want to create special exhibitions that focus, from a contemporary perspective, on Japanese art from the past."

In 1975, it was moved to Suntory Building in Akasaka, Minato, Tokyo. When the Tokyo branch of Suntory was to move to Odaiba in January 2005, the museum was temporarily closed. On March 30, 2007, the former site of the Defense Agency was redeveloped and reopened as a new "Suntory Museum of Art" to be moved into the "Tokyo Midtown". It was temporarily closed in November 2019, renovated, and reopened in July 2020. As a result, the ceiling was made more earthquake-resistant, the indoor lighting was changed to LED, and the entrance, shops and cafes adjacent to the building, and staff uniforms were renewed. The design of the renewal was supervised by Kengo Kuma, who designed the Tokyo Midtown Garden Site, where the museum is located, and the museum. The Suntory Museum of Art, Mori Art Museum and The National Art Center, Tokyo, comprise the "Roppongi Art Triangle"

== Gallery ==
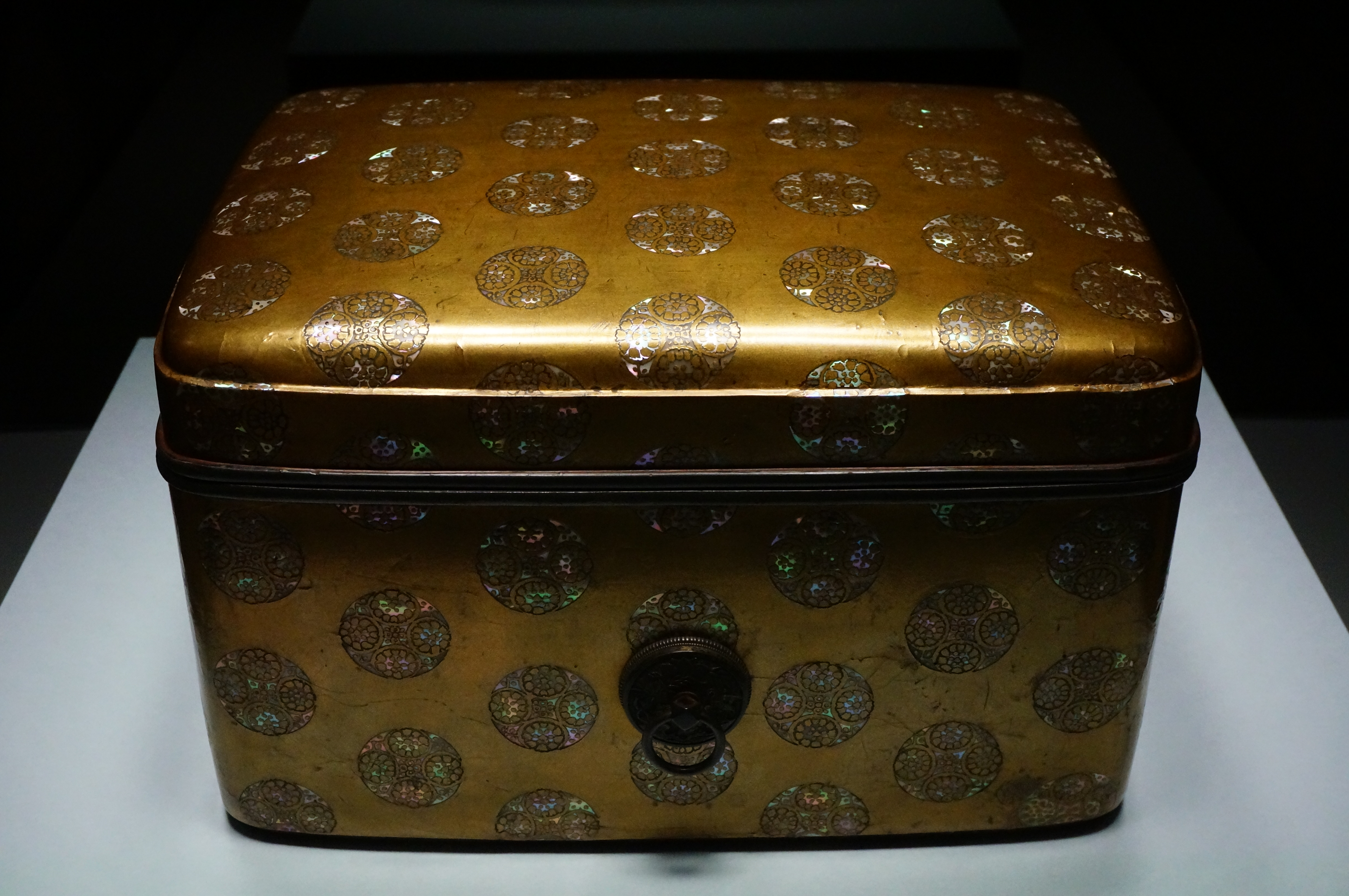
Box with fusenryō design in mother-of-pearl inlay and maki-e, Kamakura period, 13th century, National Treasure

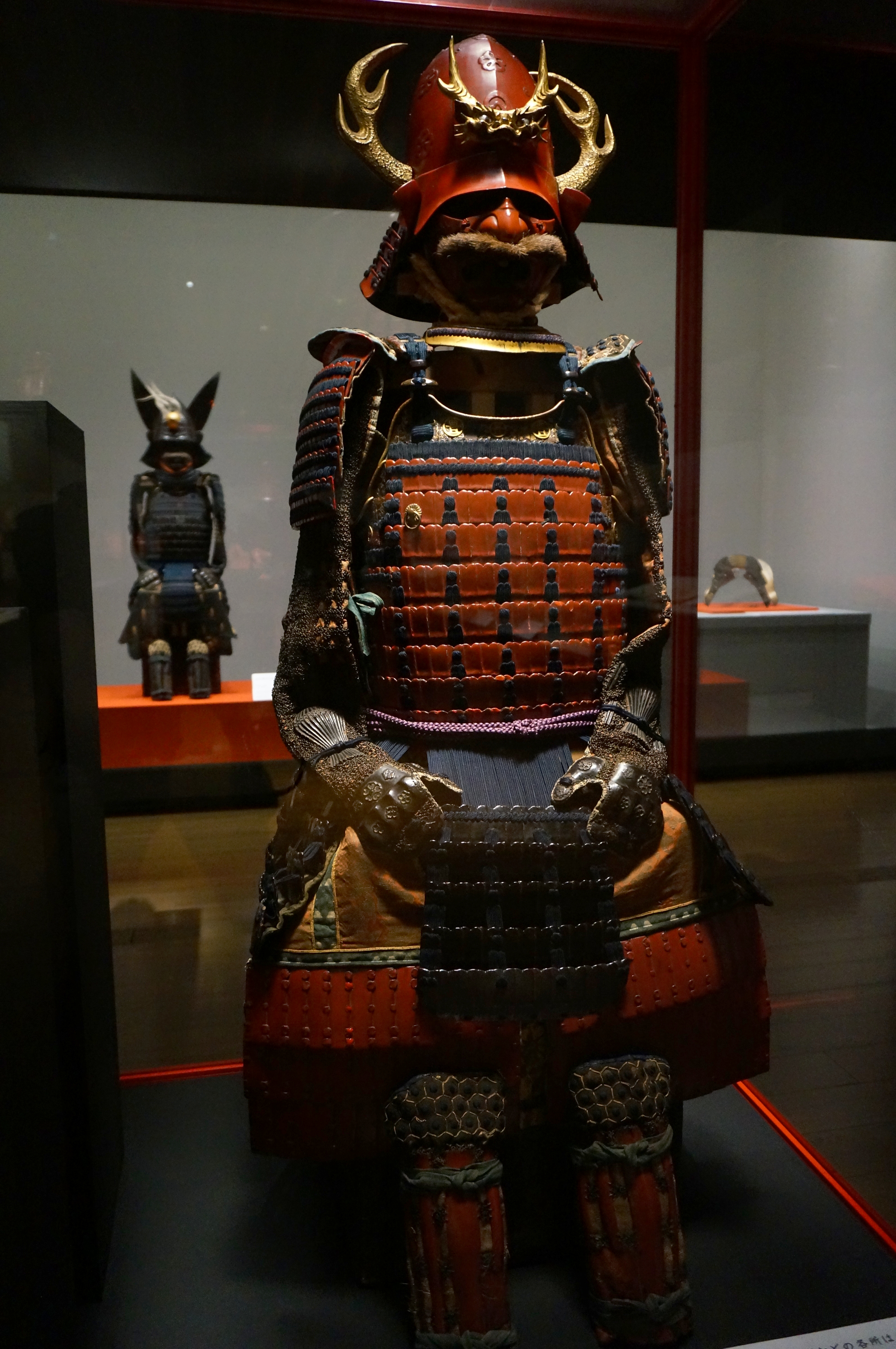
Toyotomi Hidetsugu's gusoku armour, Azuchi–Momoyama period, 16th-17th century

Nanban byōbu, by Kanō Sanraku, Azuchi–Momoyama period, 17th century, Important Cultural Property

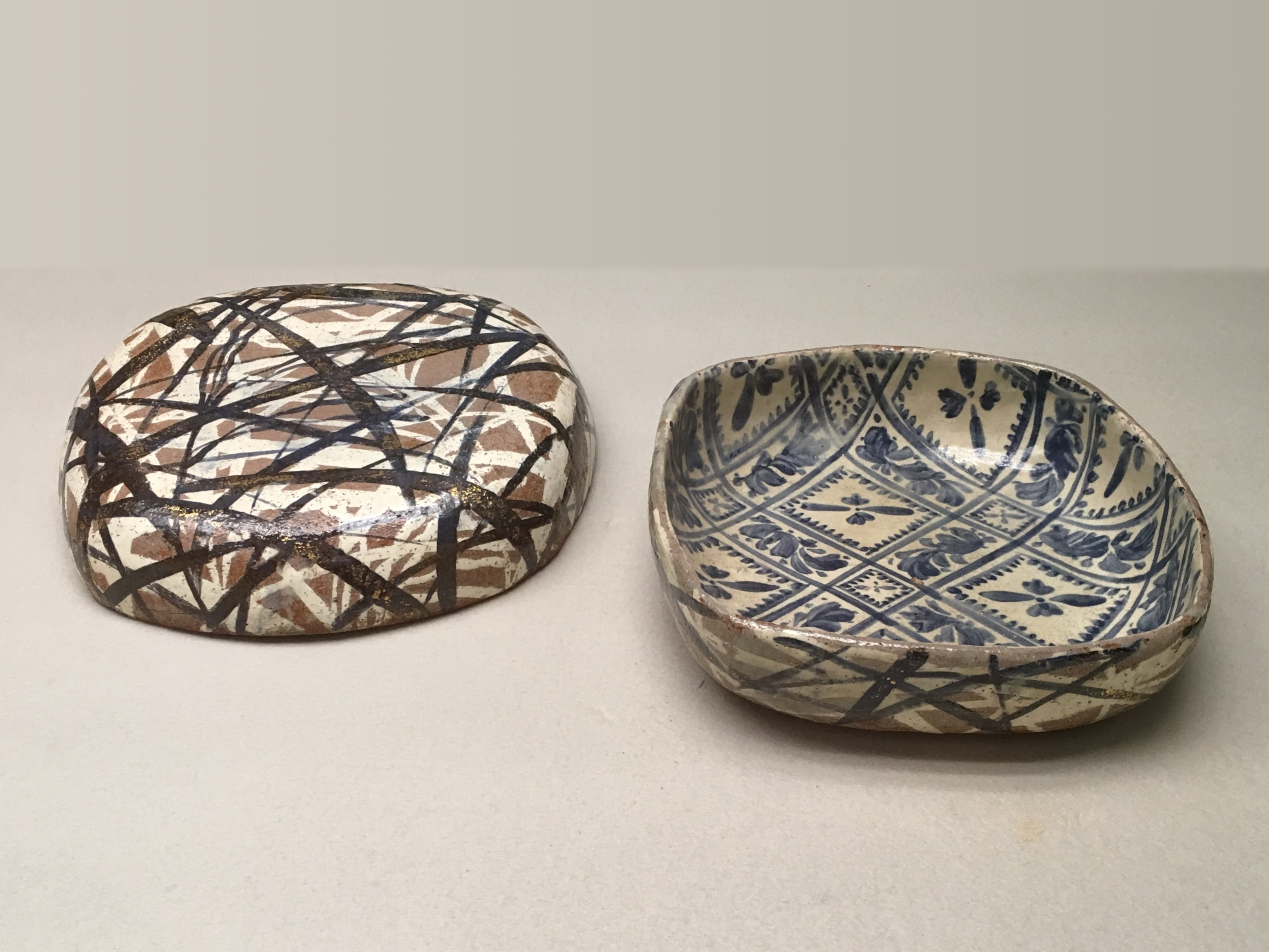
Container, earthenware, by Ogata Kenzan. Edo period, first half of 18th century, Important Cultural Property

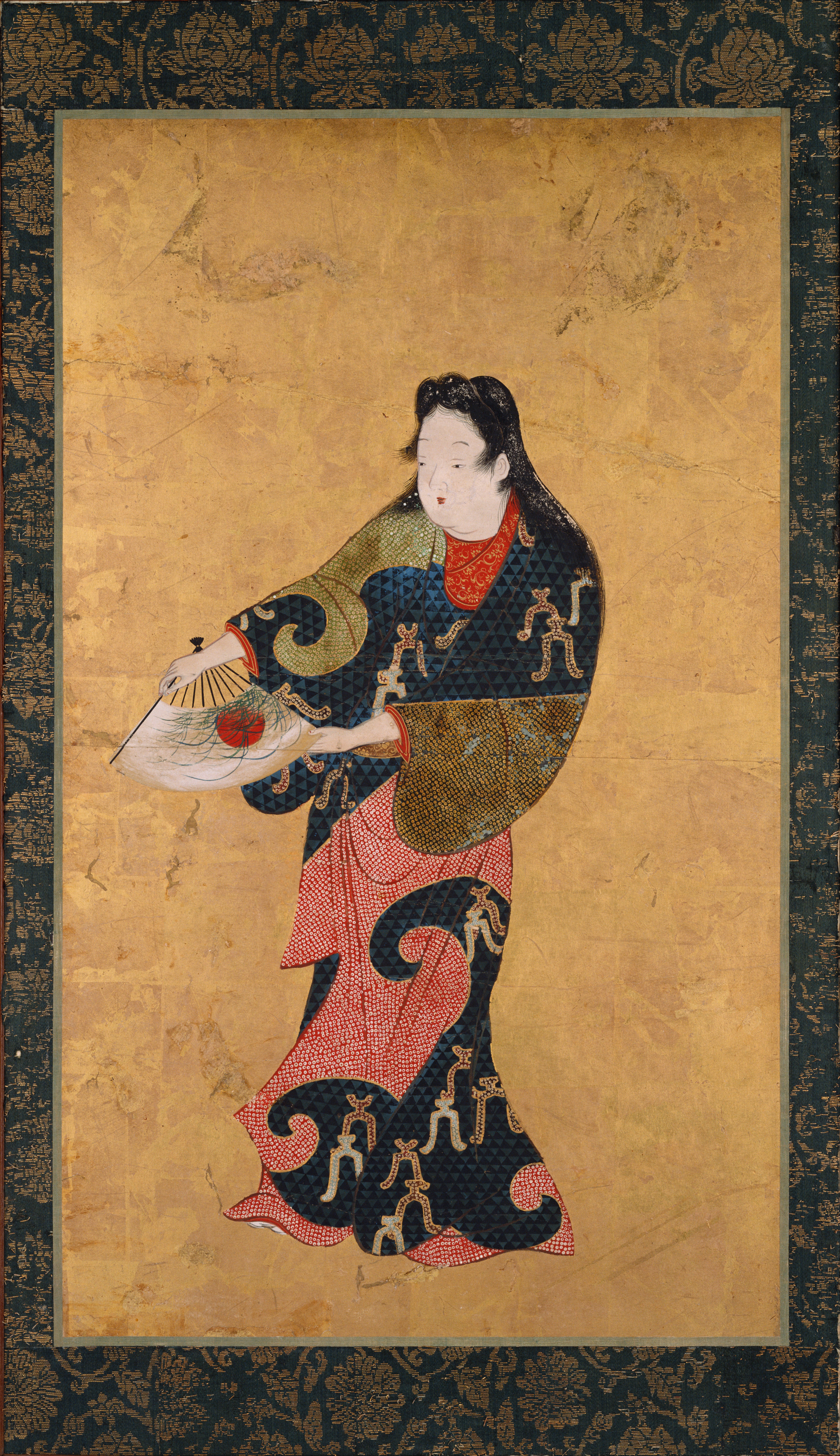
Dancers painting. Edo period (17th century), Important Cultural Property

== Publications ==
The museum has published a number of books about its collection and special exhibitions:

- In the Country of Fans, Japan (2018)
- Suntory Museum of Art 60th Anniversary Exhibition: Unsettling Japanese Art (2021)
- The Sword: The Soul of the Warrior (2021)
- Treasures from the Chishakuin Temple (2022)
- Mushi: (Insects and Other Creatures) Lovers in Japan (2023)
- A Mokubei Retrospective (2023)
- Tumultuous Times - Painters in the Bakumatsu and Meiji (2023)
- Émile Gallé: Longing for Paris (2024)
- Confucianism in Japanese Art (2024)
- Hanabusa Itchō: A Talented Man of Great Refinement Depicts the Floating World (2024)
- Shutendōji Begins: Tales of the Demon Slayer Throughout the Ages (2025)
