= Akadama (wine) =

Japanese sweet red wine

Akadama (Japanese: 赤玉; lit. 'red ball'), originally Akadama port wine, is a Japanese red fortified wine created in 1907 by Shinjirō Torii, the founder of Suntory. Akadama remains popular amongst all generations and is still found in stores across Japan today. Just like port wine, Akadama is a fortified wine.

== Origin ==
Shinjirō Torii, the founder of Suntory first sold imported Spanish wines in 1899. Due to its unpopularity with the public, he decided to produce wines that suited Japanese tastes. In 1907, he produced Suntory's first beverage, naming it "Akadama port wine." The red circle on the wine bottle label represents the sun, as Shinjiro Torii believed that "sun gives life to all beings". Akadama was a huge commercial success from which Torii was able to establish Suntory.

== Renaming ==
In 1973, Suntory renamed its Akadama port wine to Akadama sweet wine due to regulations. Port wine was originally a term used to name Portugal produced wine. In 1970s, Portugal banned the usage of the term port wine outside of its country. Despite the renaming, it is mostly referred as Akadama.

== Publicity ==
Akadama port wine was famously known for its advertisements. At the time, Akadama port wine was considered as a luxury good. It was sold at a price of 40 sen, 4 times of what a bushel of rice would have cost. Through various advertisements, Suntory received high publicity and reputation from the public. With the support from Imperial University's medical doctor, Akadama port wine was promoted as a safe and nourishing beverage. The beverage was advertised in newspapers, on hairpins worn by geishas and through the nude poster of Emiko Matsushima'.

=== Nude advertising poster ===
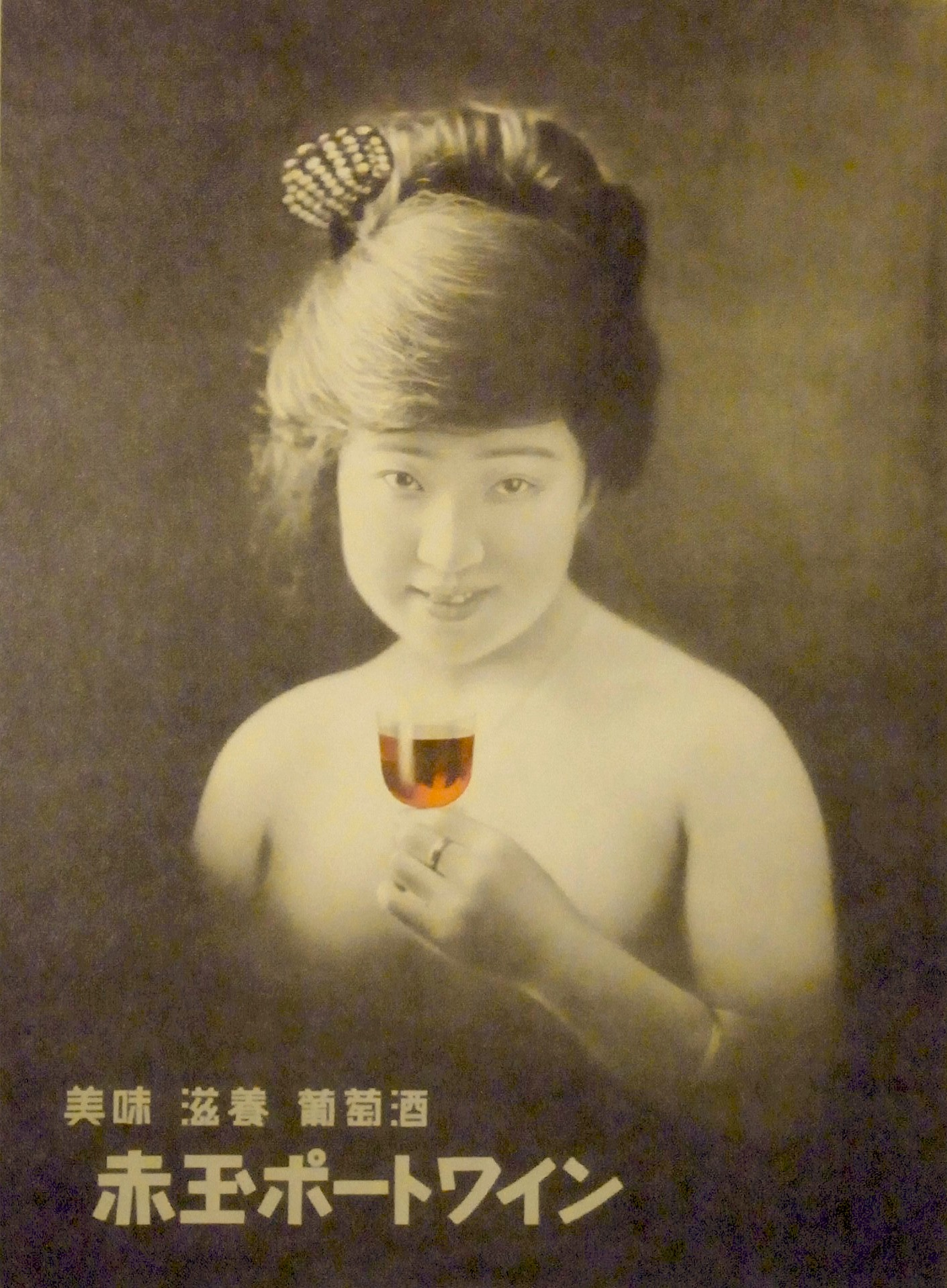
Akadama advertising poster from 1922

The nude poster was directed by Toshirou Kataoka, known as a genius in the advertising world. The poster had a huge impact on the public, as it was the first ever nude poster in Japan. It was highly unimaginable for a woman to show bare shoulders in public. The photoshoot for the poster took place in Osaka in May 1922. In the beginning, opera actress Emiko Matsushima wore a Japanese kimono. She was then shot in her inner wear and eventually, she became topless. The final poster was printed in sepia tone, creating an elegant image. Despite the huge impact on the public and winning first place at a world poster contest held in Germany, Matsushima received criticism from her family and relatives who regarded the poster as shameful.

== Others ==
In the following years, Suntory produced other beverages within the series. In 1954, Suntory produced Akadama sweet white wine and in 1966, the company produced Akadama honey wine. In 1977, Akadama punch was produced and in 2007, Akadama Punch Sparking was sold as a limited edition as a celebration of the 100th anniversary.
