= Rita Taketsuru =

Scottish-Japanese businesswoman

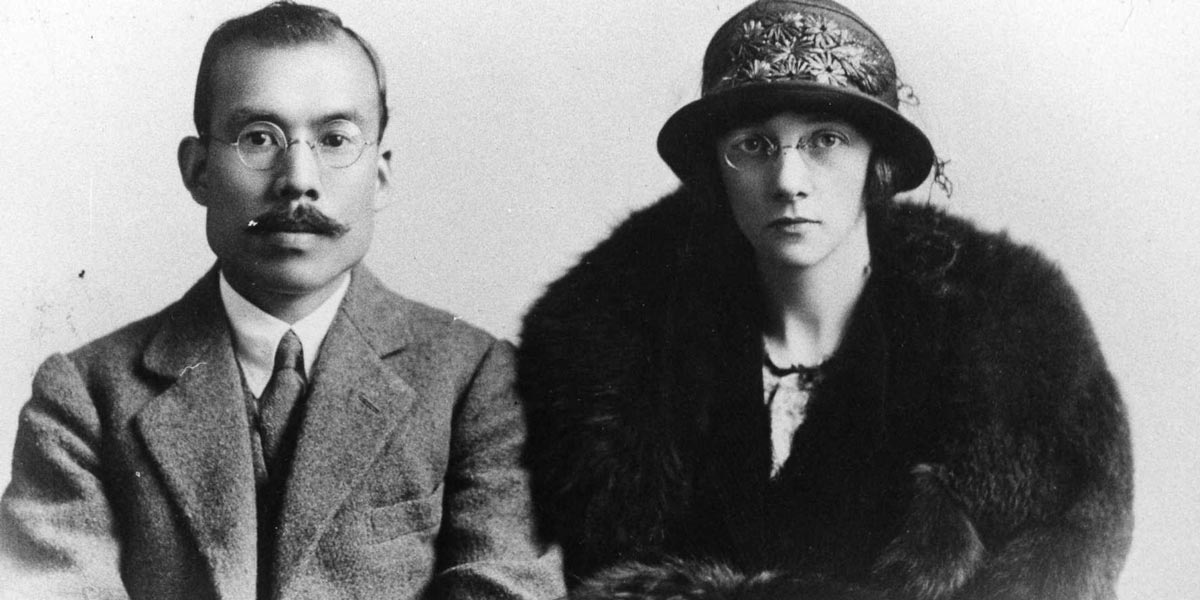
- Taketsuru with her husband Masataka
- Born: Jessie Roberta Cowan; 14 December 1896; Kirkintilloch, Scotland
- Died: 17 January 1961 (aged 64); Yoichi, Hokkaido, Japan
- Occupation: Businesswoman
- Spouse: Masataka Taketsuru (m. 1920)

Rita Taketsuru (Japanese: 竹鶴リタ, Hepburn: Taketsuru Rita; born Jessie Roberta Cowan; 14 December 1896 – 17 January 1961) was a Scottish businesswoman who joined her Japanese husband Masataka Taketsuru in co-creating the company Nikka Whisky, which established the whisky industry in Japan.

== Life ==
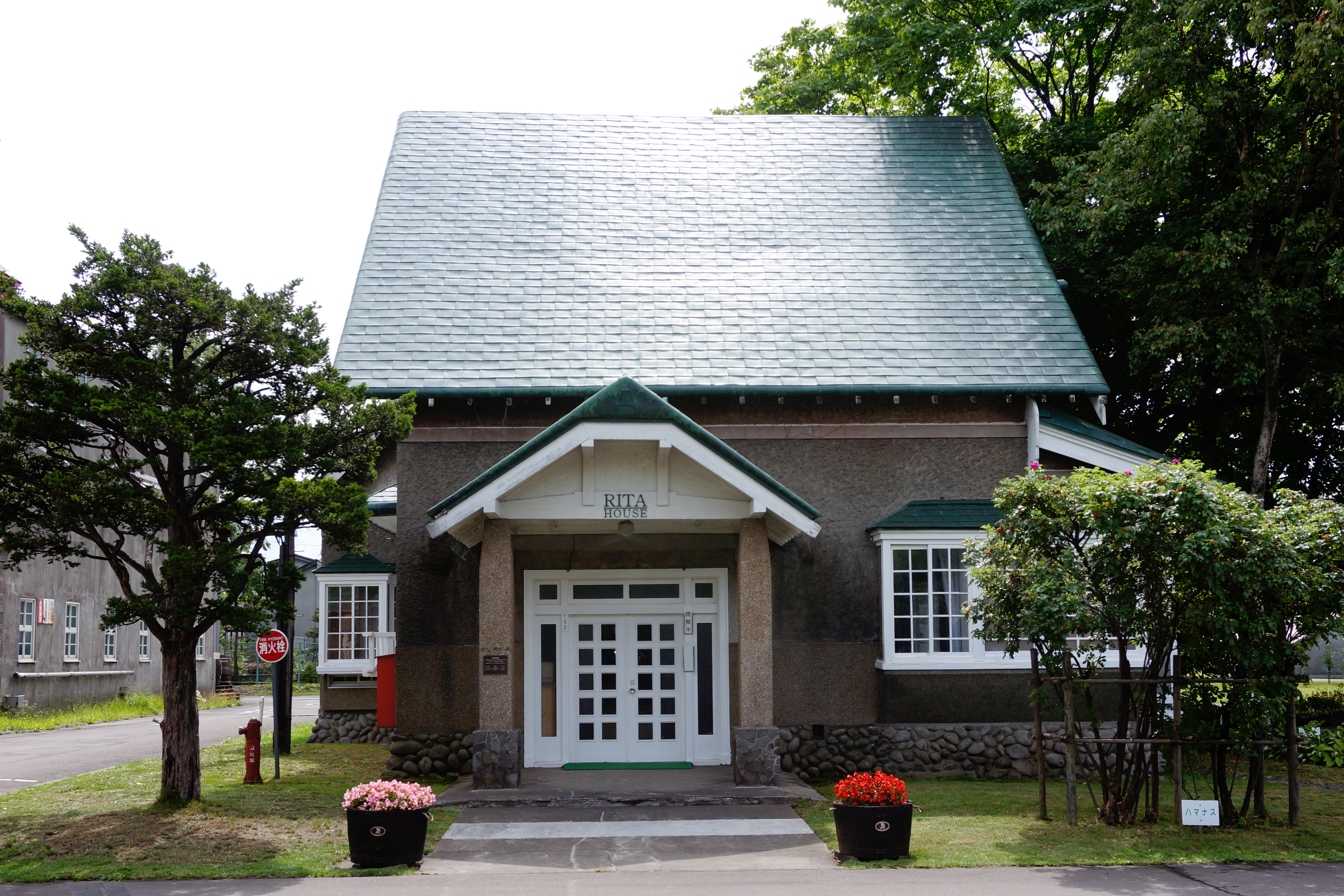
The Rita House at Yoichi Distillery

Rita Taketsuru was born Jessie Roberta Cowan in Industry Street in Kirkintilloch on 14 December 1896, the daughter of Robina McDonald (née Black) and Samuel Campbell Cowan. She had two sisters named Isabella and Lucy, and a younger brother named Campbell. She began studying organic and applied chemistry at Glasgow University in 1918. Isabella soon enrolled at the university's medical faculty, where she met Japanese chemist Masataka Taketsuru and enlisted him to teach Campbell jiu-jitsu. Masataka then met Rita at her family's house, and later expressed his love for her. He also revealed to her his wish for them to "make real whisky in Japan".

The two married in a simple ceremony at the register office in January 1920, and moved to Japan later that year, living for a while in Osaka. Rita worked as an English teacher at Tezukayama Gakuin University. Using the inheritance she received from relatives as funds, Rita established the Rita Nursery. The Yoichi Distillery contains the Rita House, which is now a Designated Tangible Cultural Property under Japanese law. After Masataka opened the distillery in 1934 in Yoichi, Hokkaidō, Rita continued to support him.

Although Rita was spared internment and allowed to stay in Yoichi during the Pacific War because she had become a Japanese citizen, the Kempeitai kept her under constant surveillance as a suspected foreign spy. They even raided her home several times and accused her of having radio equipment to contact Allied submarines. After the attack on Pearl Harbor, neighbours turned against her, she was ignored in the street, and children would throw rocks at her home.

By 1955, Rita was suffering from liver disease and tuberculosis. She began spending summers in Yoichi and winters in Zushi, where Masataka stayed during his business trips to Tokyo. She returned to Yoichi in autumn 1960 and died there on 17 January 1961, just over one month after her 64th birthday. She is buried in Yoichi with her husband, who later died in 1979. National Route 229, in front of the main train station in Yoichi, was renamed to Rita Road in her honour. She was portrayed by American actress Charlotte Kate Fox in the Japanese drama series Massan (2014–2015).

Masataka's maternal nephew Takeshi Taketsuru, who had been adopted by Rita and Masataka following his father's death, took over Nikka Whisky after their deaths and substantially expanded the business.
