= Ben Nevis Distillery =

Whisky distillery in Highland, Scotland

Coordinates: 56°50′6.52″N 5°4′25.99″W

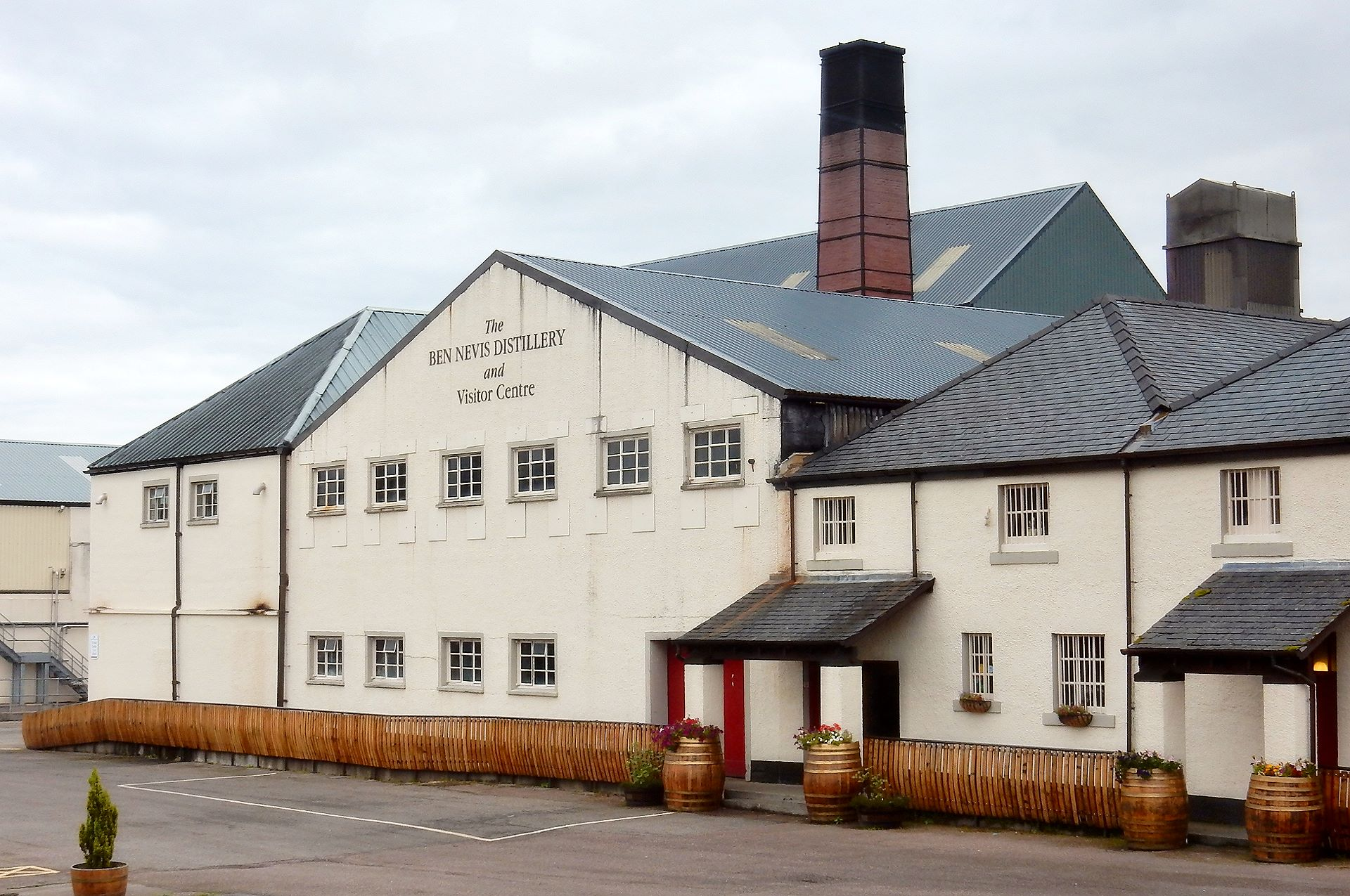

Region: Highland
- Location: Fort William
- Owner: Nikka
- Founded: 1825
- Status: Operational
- Water source: Allt a'Mhuilinn
- No. of stills: 2 wash (25,000 Liters); 2 spirit (20,000 Liters)
- Capacity: 2,000,000 litres

Ben Nevis
- Type: Single malt
- Age(s): 10-year-old

Ben Nevis Distillery is a whisky distillery in Fort William, Scotland. It is situated at the base of Ben Nevis, the highest mountain in the British Isles, which rises to 1,345 m (4,413 ft) above sea level.

A coastal distillery in the Western Highlands, the distillery draws its water from the Allt a’Mhuilinn which originates from two pools on Ben Nevis, Coire Leis and Coire na’Ciste. Founded in 1825 as an independent enterprise, it has been owned by Nikka Whisky Distilling of Tokyo, Japan, since 1989.

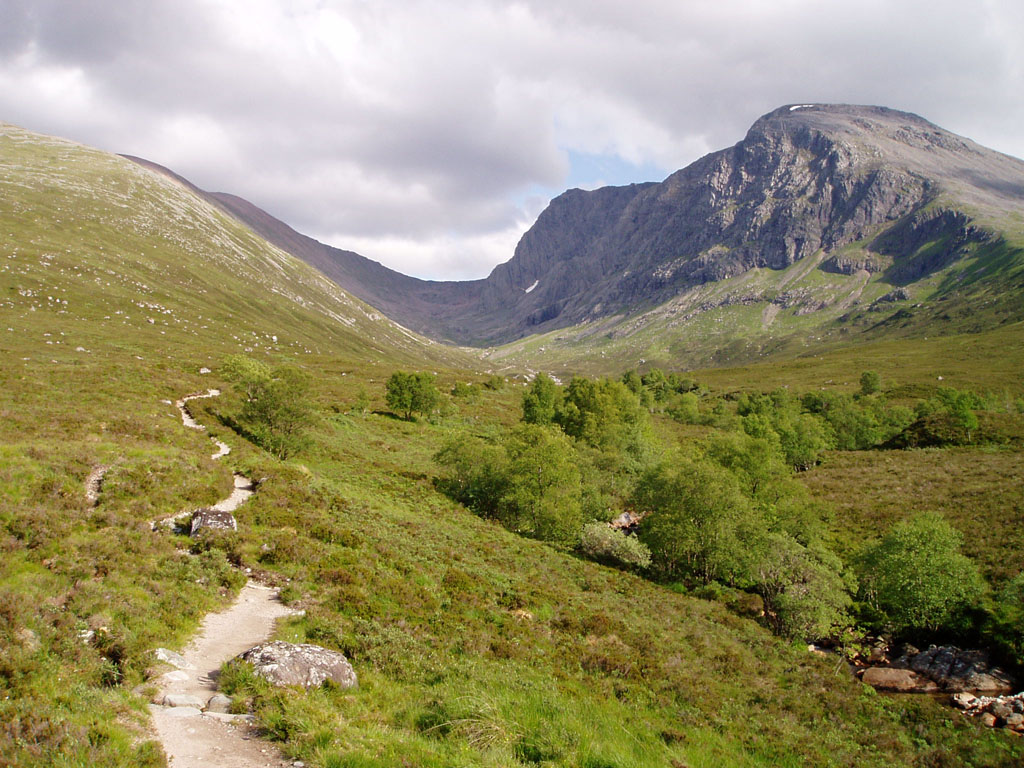
Allt a' Mhuilinn up to the Coire Leis, the water source of Ben Nevis

== History ==
The distillery was founded in 1825 by 'Long John' McDonald, a 6 ft 4 in (1.93 m) descendant of a ruler of the western Scottish kingdom of Argyll (after whom the renowned blended Scotch, Long John, was named). After Long John's death in 1856, ownership was passed down to Donald McDonald, his son.

A second distillery was sited nearby in 1878 and named Nevis Distillery. In a bid to keep up with growing demand, the two distilleries eventually became one in the early twentieth century.

In 1955 the distillery was taken over by new proprietors led by Joseph Hobbs. Under Hobbs, the distillery began using continuous distillation, installing a Coffey Still which remained on the site until 1981 and made the distillery one of the first to produce both malt and grain whisky simultaneously.

The Japanese company Nikka acquired the distillery in 1989.

In 1991, a visitor centre and cafe was opened for the public.

== Production ==
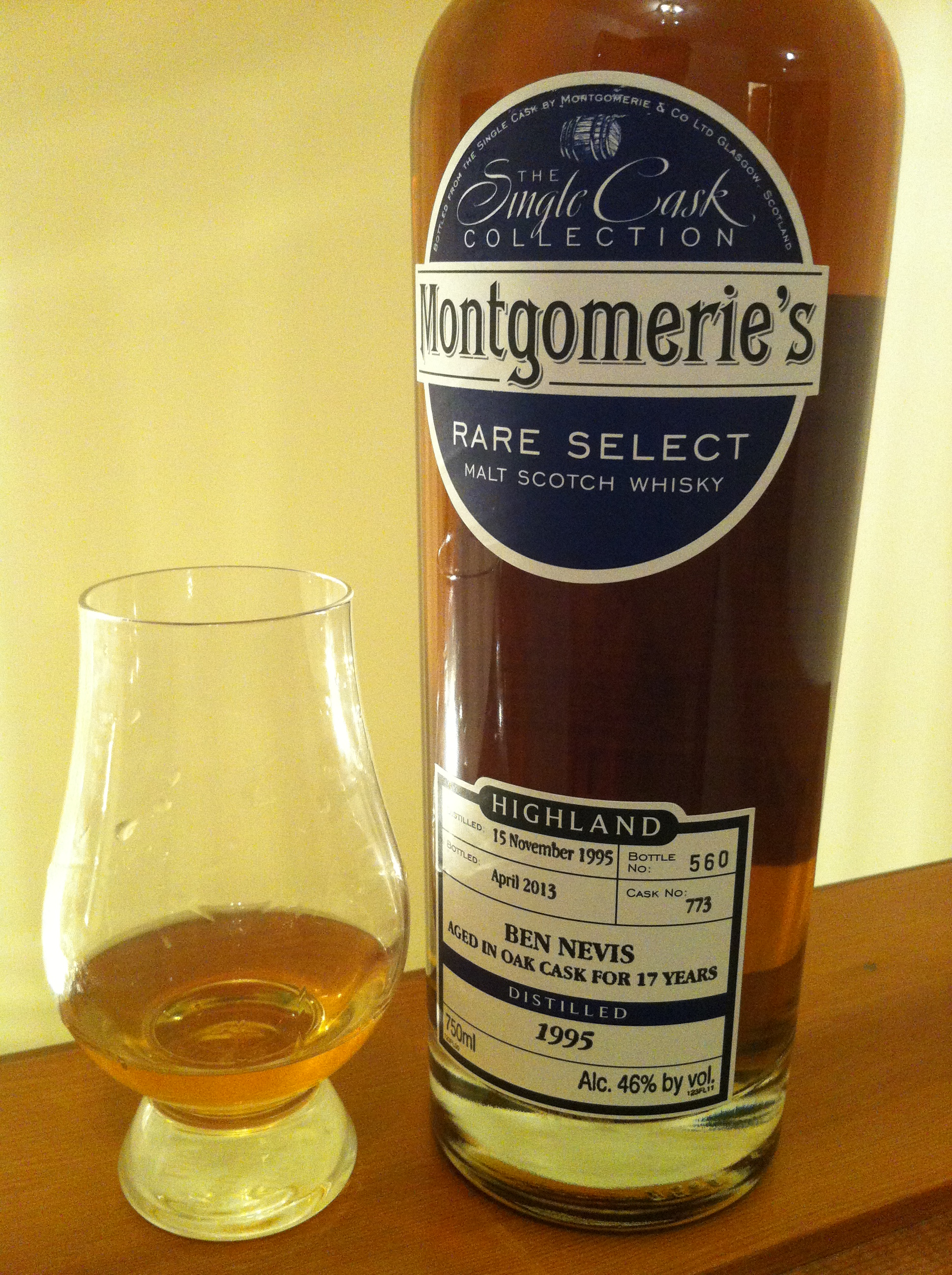
A 17 yr independent bottling of casks from the Ben Nevis distillery.

The heart of the range has been for some time the 10 years old. There have also been a few cask-finishes, limited editions and independent bottlings, notably from Blackadder and Douglas Laing.
