= Takeshi Taketsuru =

Japanese Whiskey distiller

- 竹鶴威
- Born: March 6, 1924
- Died: December 17, 2014 (aged 90)
- Occupation: Whisky distiller
- Employer: Nikka Whisky
- Known for: Expanding Nikka Whisky
- Spouse: Utako Taketsuru
- Children: Kotaro Taketsuru, Minobu Taketsuru
- Mother: Nobuyo Taketsuru
- Relatives: Masataka Taketsuru (uncle, adoptive father); Rita Taketsuru (aunt, adoptive mother)

Takeshi Taketsuru (Japanese: 竹鶴威, 6 March 1924 – 17 December 2014) was a Japanese whisky distiller. He was the nephew of Masataka Taketsuru, from his sister Nobuyo, and his wife Rita Taketsuru, the founders of the Nikka Whisky company before being adopted by them after his father's death in 1943. After their deaths, he took over the company, and expanded its business substantially.

He died on 17 December 2014, at the age of 90. Having married his wife, Utako, in 1951, he is survived by his two children, Kotaro and Minobu.
