= Miyagikyo distillery =

Japanese whisky distillery in Tōhoku region, Japan

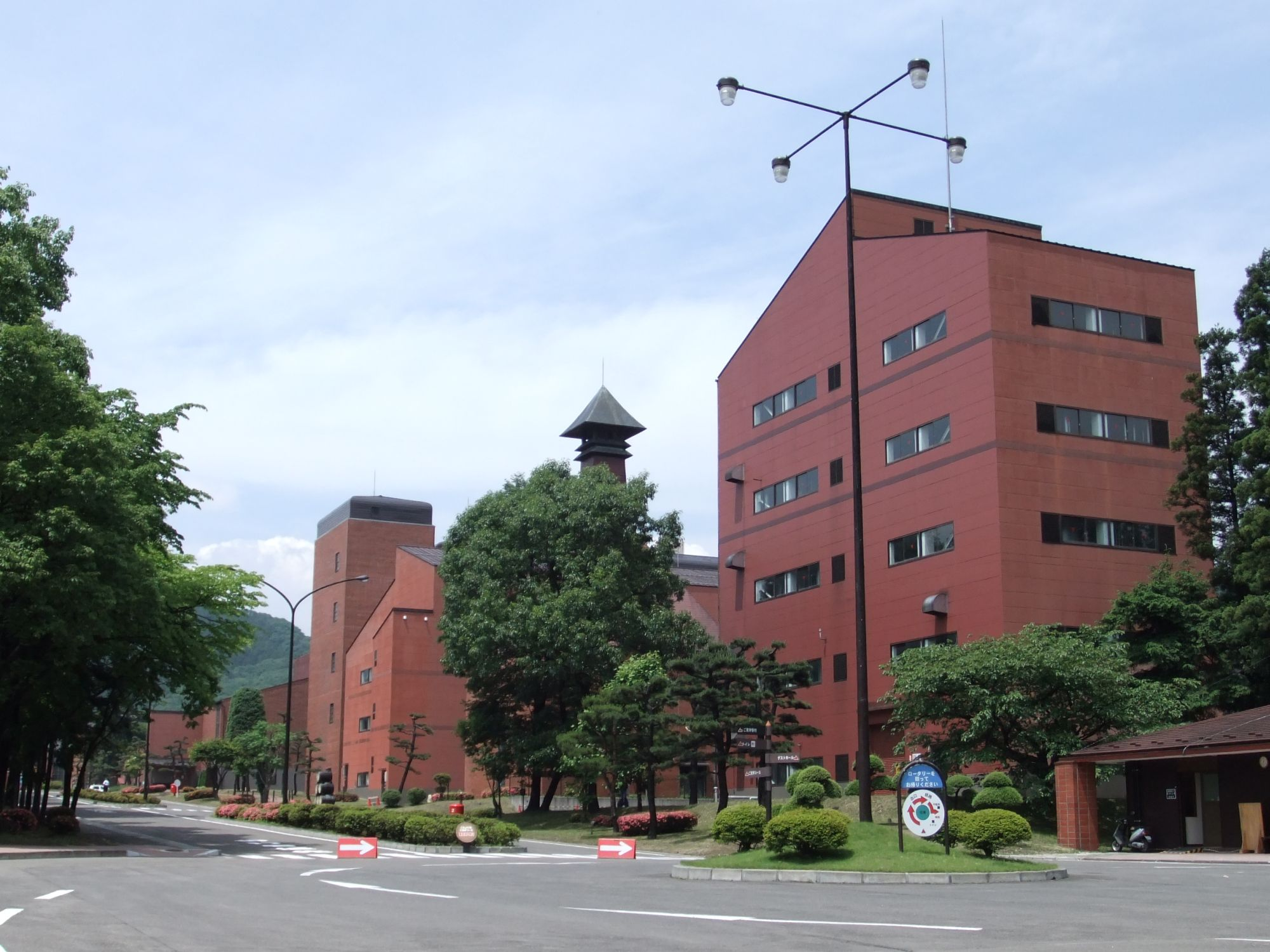

Region: Japan
- Location: Nikka 1, Aoba-ku, Sendai city, Miyagi Prefecture, 989-3433
- Coordinates: 38°18′29″N 140°39′02″E
- Owner: Nikka Whisky Distilling
- Founded: 1969
- Status: Active
- No. of stills: 8 pot stills
- Website: Nikka Whisky Distilling

Miyagikyo distillery (Japanese: 宮城峡蒸溜所, Hepburn: Miyagikyō jōryūsho) is a Japanese whisky distillery. It is located near Sendai (仙台市, Sendai-shi), the capital city of Miyagi Prefecture, Tōhoku region, Japan.

The distillery is owned by Nikka Whisky Distilling, and was opened in 1969. Originally known as "Sendai distillery", it was the second to be established by Nikka Whisky, after the company’s Yoichi distillery in Hokkaido.
