= Nobutada Saji =

Japanese businessman (born 1945)

Nobutada Saji 佐治 信忠
- Born: November 25, 1945 (age 80); Hyōgo, Japan
- Education: Keio University; UCLA Anderson School of Management
- Occupations: Businessman, philanthropist
- Organization: Suntory
- Title: Kaichō
- Parent(s): Keizo Saji (Torii); Yoshiko (Hiraga)
- Awards: Order of the Rising Sun; Franz Schalk Gold Medal

Nobutada Saji (佐治 信忠, Saji Nobutada; born November 25, 1945) is a Japanese businessman. He is the chairman and Representative Director of Suntory Ltd, and Chairman of Ad Council Japan. He is also a trustee and director of Keio University. He was ranked 4th on Forbes 2026 list of Japan's richest people, with a net worth of US $9.3 billion (¥1.02 trillion).

== Early life and education ==
Saji was born in present day Kawanishi, Hyōgo, the son of Keizo Saji. Keizo was the second son of Suntory founder Shinjirō Torii and was adopted by his mother's family as they did not have a male heir to continue their name. Saji's mother Yoshiko was the daughter of Baron Yuzuru Hiraga, a decorated Vice Admiral and naval architect in the pre-war Navy.

He was educated at Koyo Gakuin High School, Keio University, and the UCLA Anderson School of Management. Following his graduation from UCLA in 1971, his father then recommend he gain experience working outside the family, and he went to work for Sony, which at the time was one of the few internationally competitive companies in Japan.

== Career at Suntory ==
In 1974, Saji returned to the family business where he applied some of the lessons he learned at Sony in the sales and marketing divisions, and was instrumental in introducing Suntory's Kakubin hi-balls to younger customers looking for modern western-style cocktails. He then was sent back to America to oversee Suntory's international division in 1979. There, he recognized Midori's potential appeal and spearheaded efforts to promote it, becoming one of the top imported liqueurs in the US. He then moved to acquire Pepcom, an independent Pepsi Co bottler and distributor on the East Coast, which soon yielded significant profits and planted the seeds of Suntory's internationalization.

Upon his return to Japan in 1981, Saji focused on diversification, overseeing the introduction of soft drinks such as bottled teas and Boss Coffee, rapidly moving up through the ranks from branch manager, director, managing director, and executive vice president, each time with strategic moves that helped increase Suntory's market share from thousands of cases sold by 20 companies and ¥23.6 billion in profits in 1980 to 32 companies and ¥226.6 billion by 2001 when he succeeded his cousin Shinichiro Torii as Suntory's 4th president.

As president, Suntory continued to expand internationally, most notably through the US $16 billion acquisition of Jim Beam and Maker's Mark, becoming the world's third-largest distiller with over ¥3 trillion in sales.

Saji stepped down from day-to-day management of Suntory in 2014 to concentrate on Suntory's philanthropic endeavors, where he serves as chairman of the Suntory Foundation, providing critical scholarships, research grants, and awards such as the Suntory Prize and the Suntory Music Award. He oversaw the donation of ¥8.8 billion (US $110 million) and a million bottles of water to victims of the 2011 Tōhoku earthquake and tsunami. Additionally, he serves as an advisory director for Carnegie Hall, and on the organizational board of the Momo-Kaki Orphans Fund.

== Honors ==
In 2016, Saji was recognized with an The Order of the Rising Sun, Gold Rays with Rosette from the Japanese Government, and Vienna Philharmonic's Franz Schalk Gold Medal for their decades of collaboration with Suntory Hall. His leadership overseeing Suntory's innovative advertising earned him the Tokyo Advertising Association Shirakawa Shinobu Award in 2017.

== See also ==
- Ad Council Japan
- Suntory
- The World's Billionaires
