= Yoichi distillery =

Japanese whisky distillery in Hokkaido, Japan

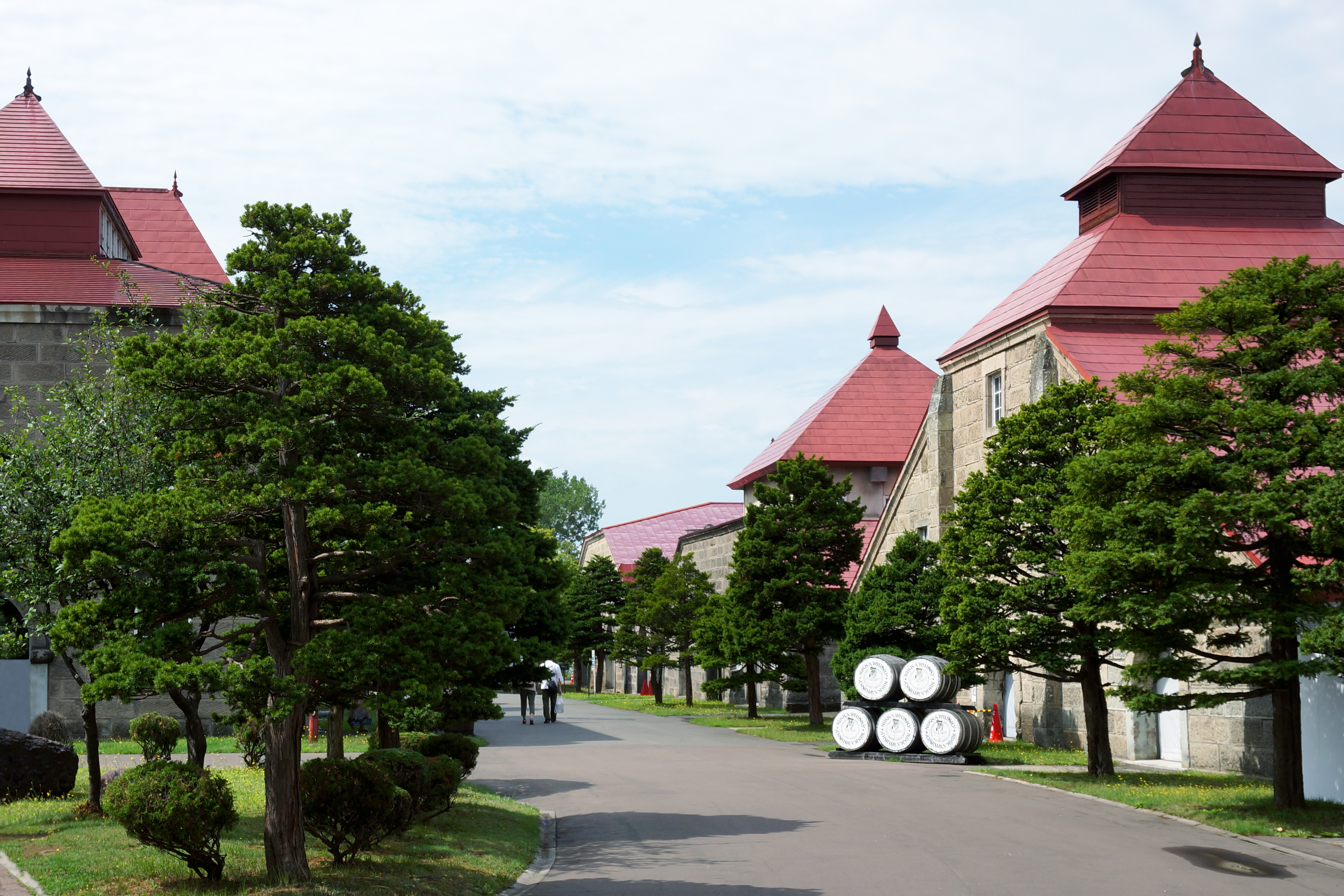

Region: Japan
- Location: Kurokawacho 7-6, Yoichicho, Yoichi-gun, Hokkaido, 046-0003
- Coordinates: 43°11′14″N 140°47′30″E
- Owner: Nikka Whisky Distilling
- Founded: 1934
- Status: Active
- No. of stills: 6 pot stills
- Website: Nikka Whisky Distilling

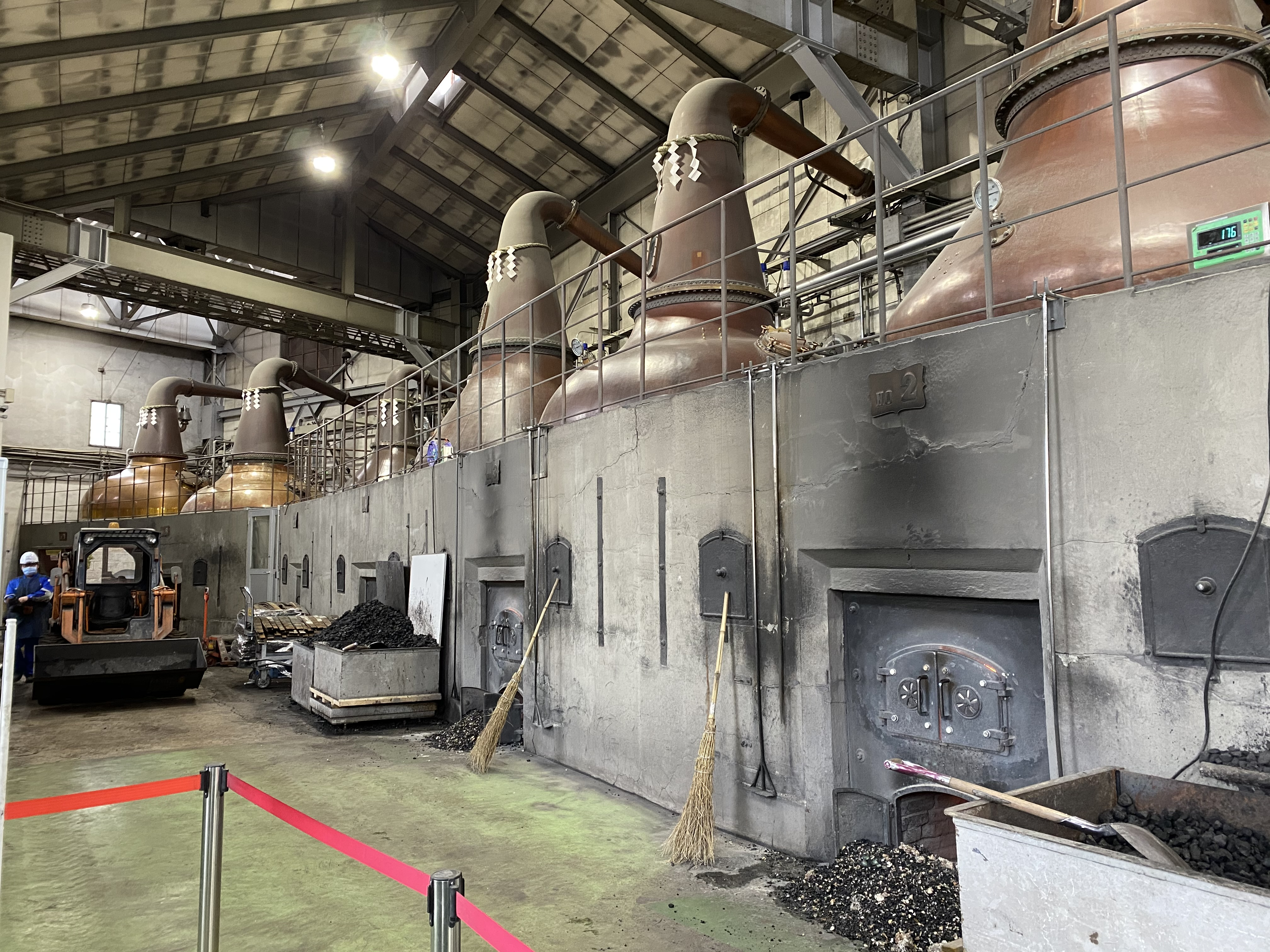

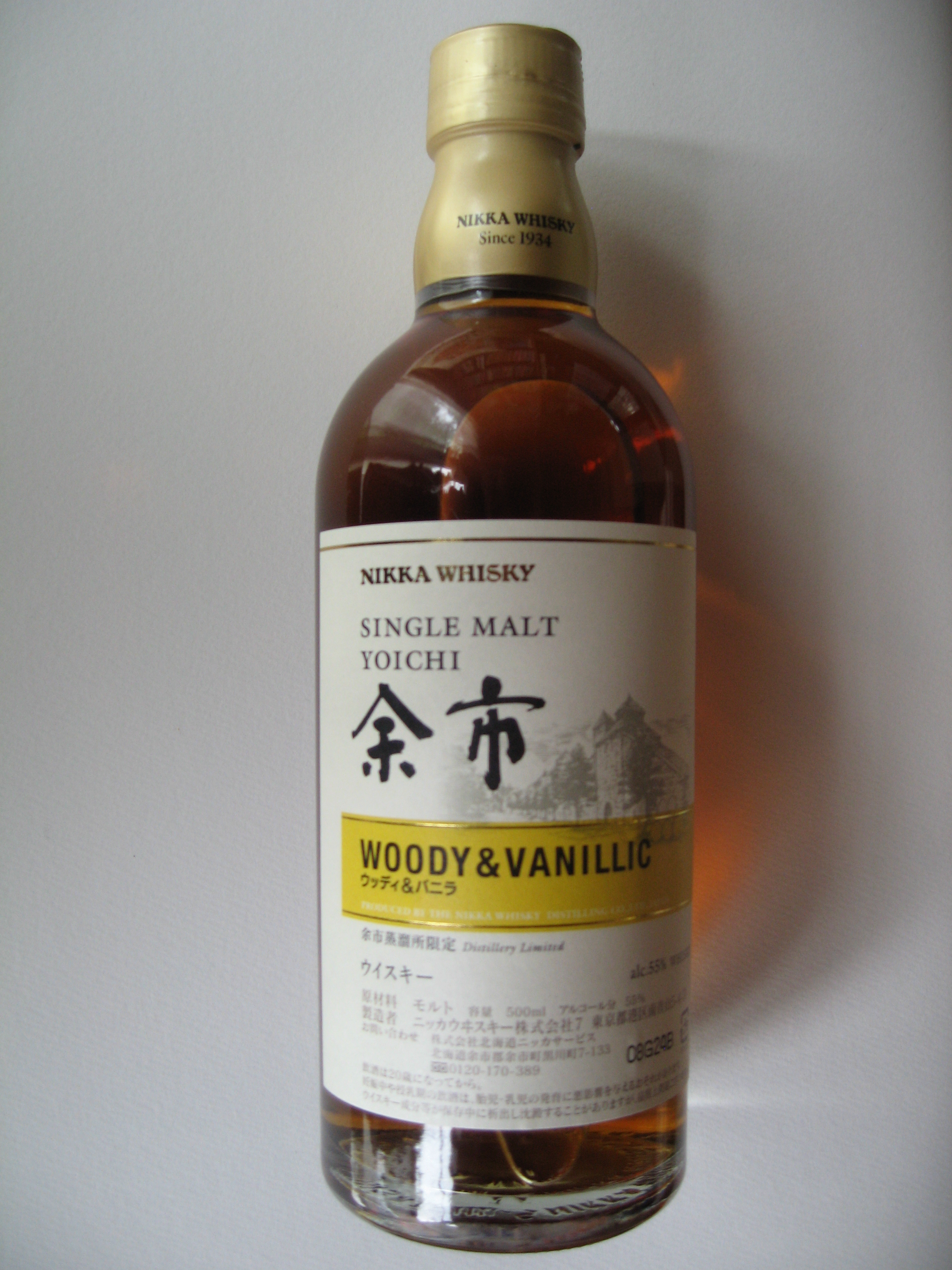

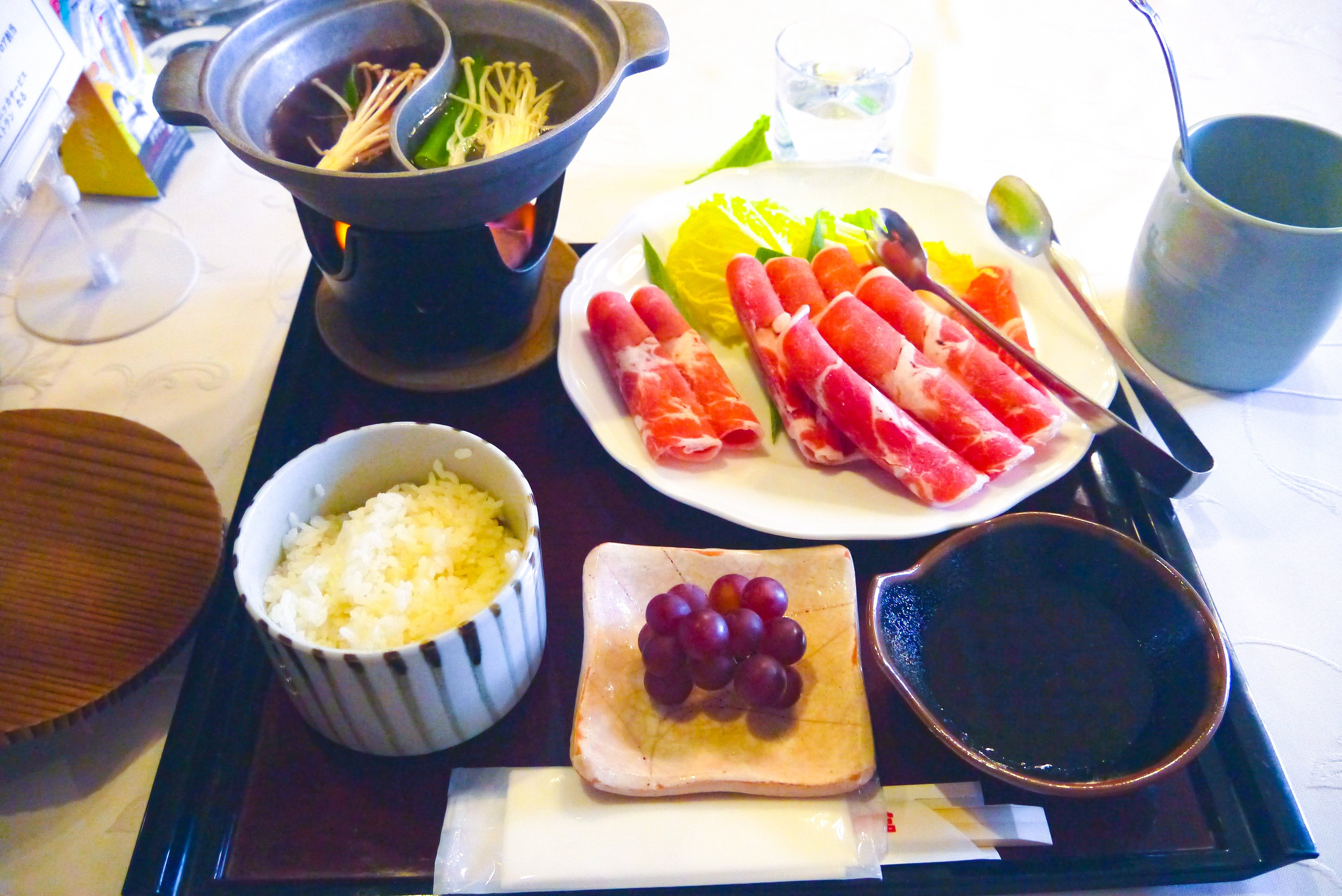

Yoichi distillery (Japanese: 余市蒸溜所, Hepburn: Yoichi jōryūsho) is a Japanese whisky distillery. It is located at Yoichi, (余市町, Yoichi-chō) a town in the Yoichi District, Shiribeshi Subprefecture, Hokkaido, Japan.

The distillery is owned by Nikka Whisky Distilling, and was opened in 1934. It is the older of the two distilleries owned by Nikka Whisky, the other being the company’s Miyagikyo distillery near Sendai.

== See also ==
- List of historic whisky distilleries
