= Nikka Whisky Distilling =

Japanese whisky company

Nikka Whisky Distilling Co. Ltd.
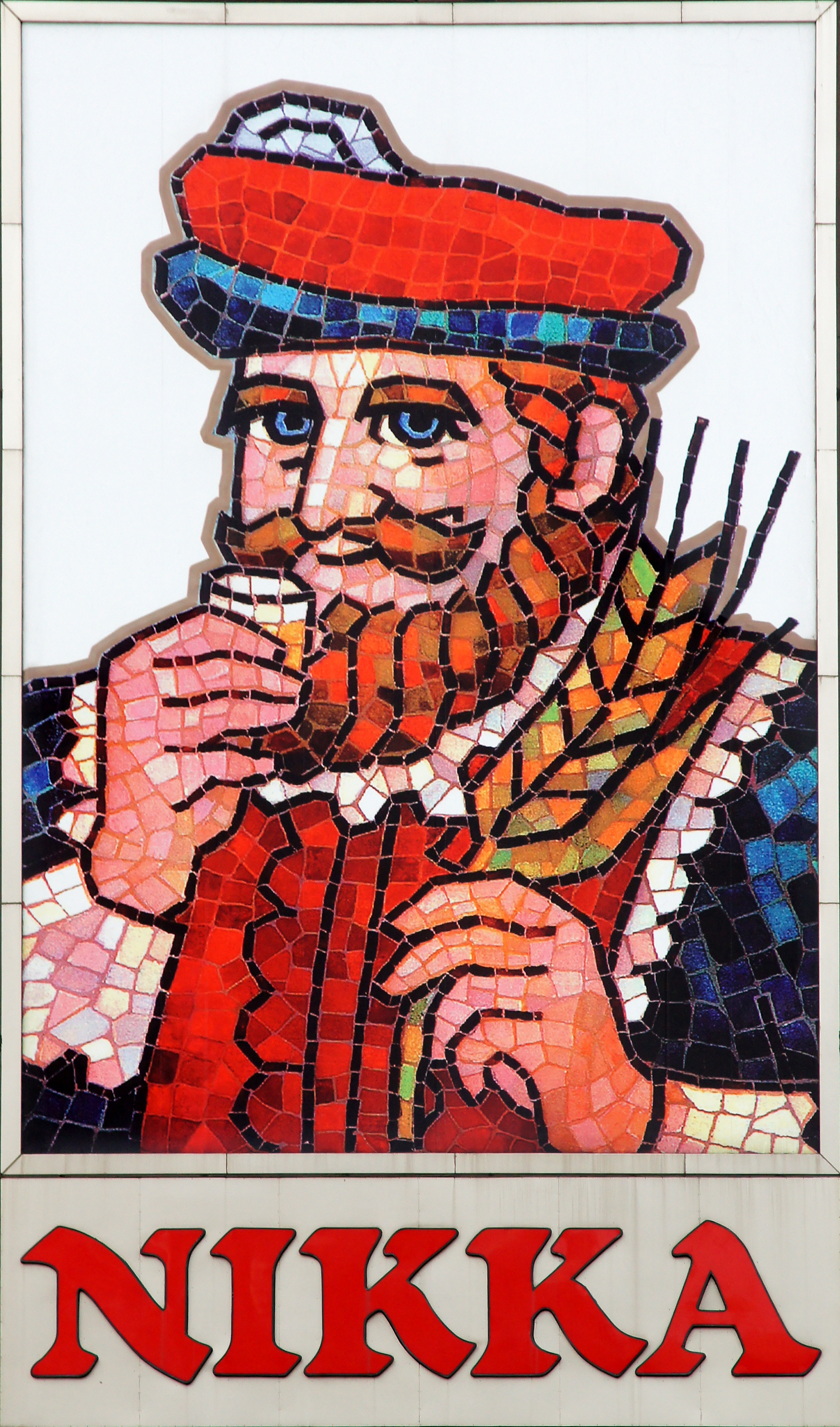
- Native name: ニッカウヰスキー株式会社
- Romanized name: Nikka Uwisukī Kabushiki Gaisha
- Industry: Drink industry
- Founded: 1934; 92 years ago
- Founder: Masataka Taketsuru
- Headquarters: Azumabashi, Sumida, Tokyo, Japan
- Products: Whisky
- Owner: Asahi Breweries
- Website: nikka.com/eng/

The Nikka Whisky Distilling Co. Ltd. (ニッカウヰスキー株式会社, Nikka Uwisukī Kabushiki-gaisha) is a producer of Japanese whisky and other beverages headquartered in Tokyo. It is owned by Asahi Group Holdings.

The company operates a number of distilleries and other facilities in Japan, including two Japanese whisky distilleries, the Yoichi distillery in Yoichi, Hokkaidō (established in 1934), and the Miyagikyo distillery in Aoba-ku, Sendai, Miyagi Prefecture, Northern Honshū (established in 1969). It also owns the Ben Nevis Distillery (acquired in 1989) in Scotland.

== History ==
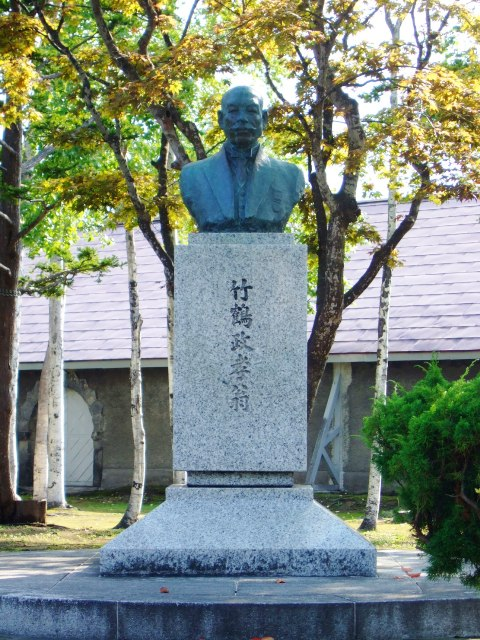
Monument to Masataka Taketsuru, the founder of Nikka Whisky

The founder, Masataka Taketsuru, travelled to Scotland in 1918 to learn the process of distilling Scotch whisky first hand. He studied organic chemistry under Prof. T. S. Patterson at the University of Glasgow and malt whisky production at the Hazelburn distillery, in Campbeltown near the Mull of Kintyre. He married Jessie Roberta "Rita" Cowan, the daughter of a Glasgow doctor, and returned with her to Japan in 1920. In 1923 he joined Kotobukiya (currently Suntory) and helped to establish a distillery before starting Nikka in 1934.

Commentary on Nikka frequently emphasizes the company’s prominence as deriving not only from brand expansion but also from a sustained narrative of technical legitimacy and place. Nikka’s own presentation of Yoichi stresses Masataka Taketsuru’s search for a Scottish-like environment (cool climate, crisp air, and water resources), a framing that has continued to shape how the distillery and its malt-forward profile are discussed in overviews of Japanese whisky.

After their deaths, the company was run by their adoptive son, Takeshi Taketsuru, who expanded its business substantially.

== Products ==
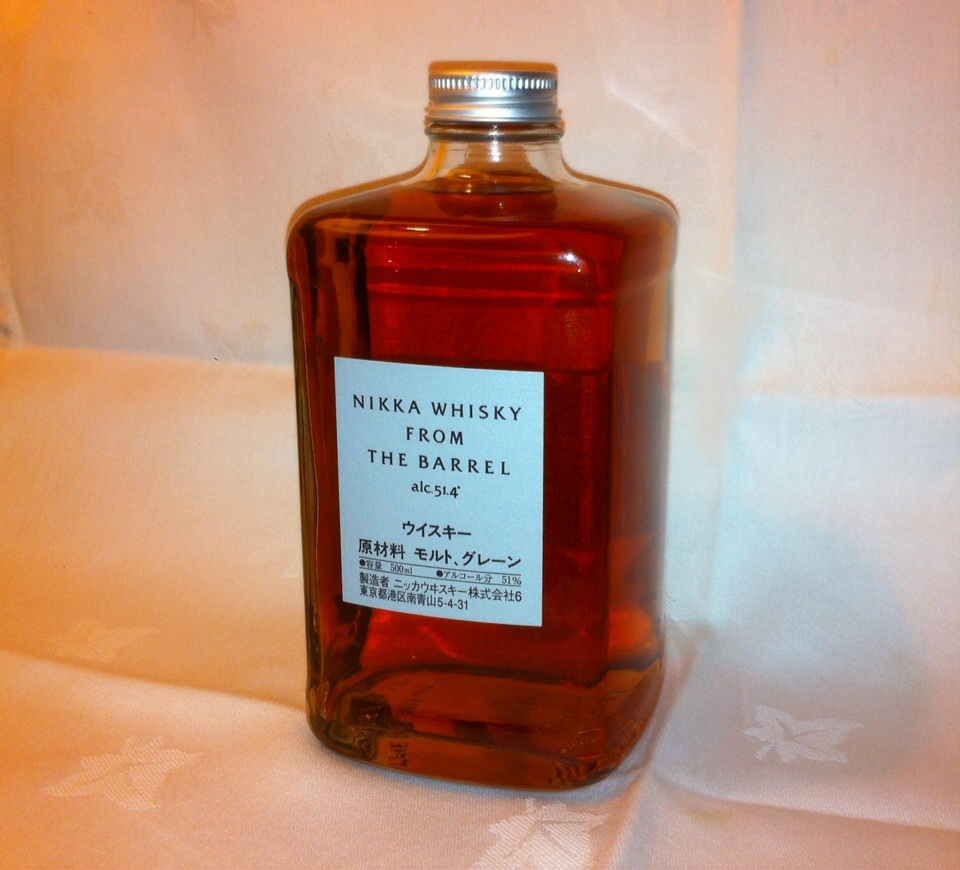
A 50 cl bottle of From the Barrel

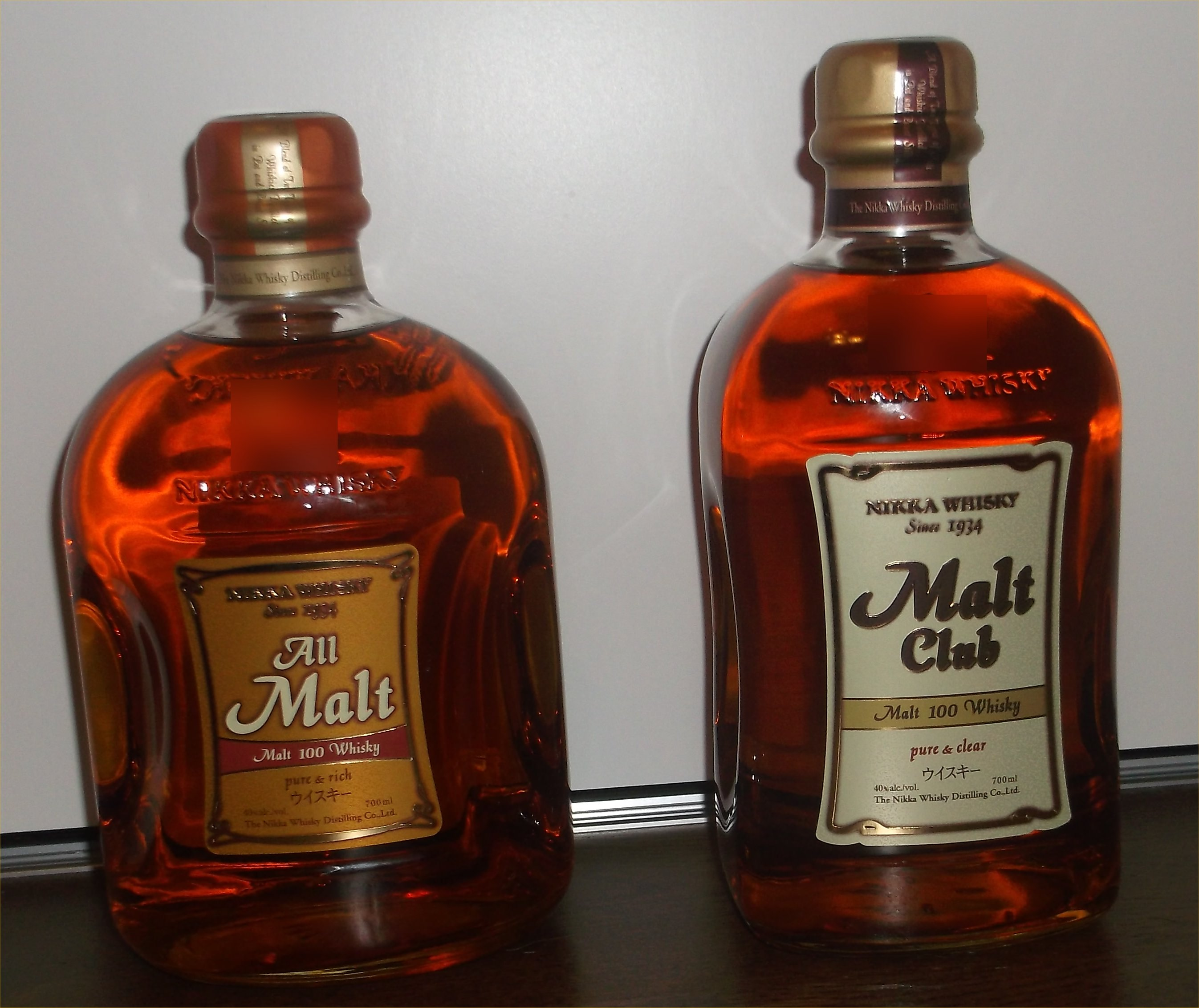
All Malt (left) and Malt Club (right) blended whiskies

Nikka produces a wide variety of Japanese whiskies, ranging from ¥900 (per 700 ml bottle) Black Nikka sold in Japanese convenience stores, to the ¥15,750 (per 750 ml bottle) Nikka Single Cask. In 2008, Yoichi 20 Year Old was voted best single malt at the World Whiskies Awards.

Black Nikka is a 37% alcoholic whisky, available at corner stores throughout Japan in 180, 300, 700, 1800, 1920, 2700, and 4000 mL bottles. Individual servings, pre-mixed with soda or water, are also available.

Nikka has been owned by Asahi Group Holdings since 1954.

=== Whiskies ===
- Yoichi Single Malt
- Miyagikyo Single Malt
- From The Barrel
- Taketsuru Pure Malt
- Taketsuru Pure Malt 17-Year
- Coffey Malt
- Coffey Grain
- Pure Malt Red
- Pure Malt Black
- Pure Malt White
- All Malt
- Blended
- Ben Nevis

== Distilleries and plants ==
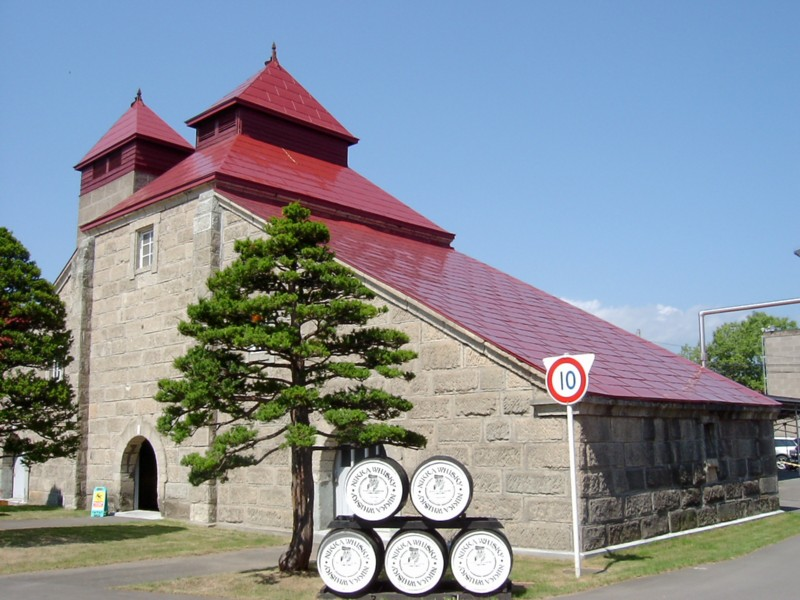
One of the buildings of Yoichi Distillery

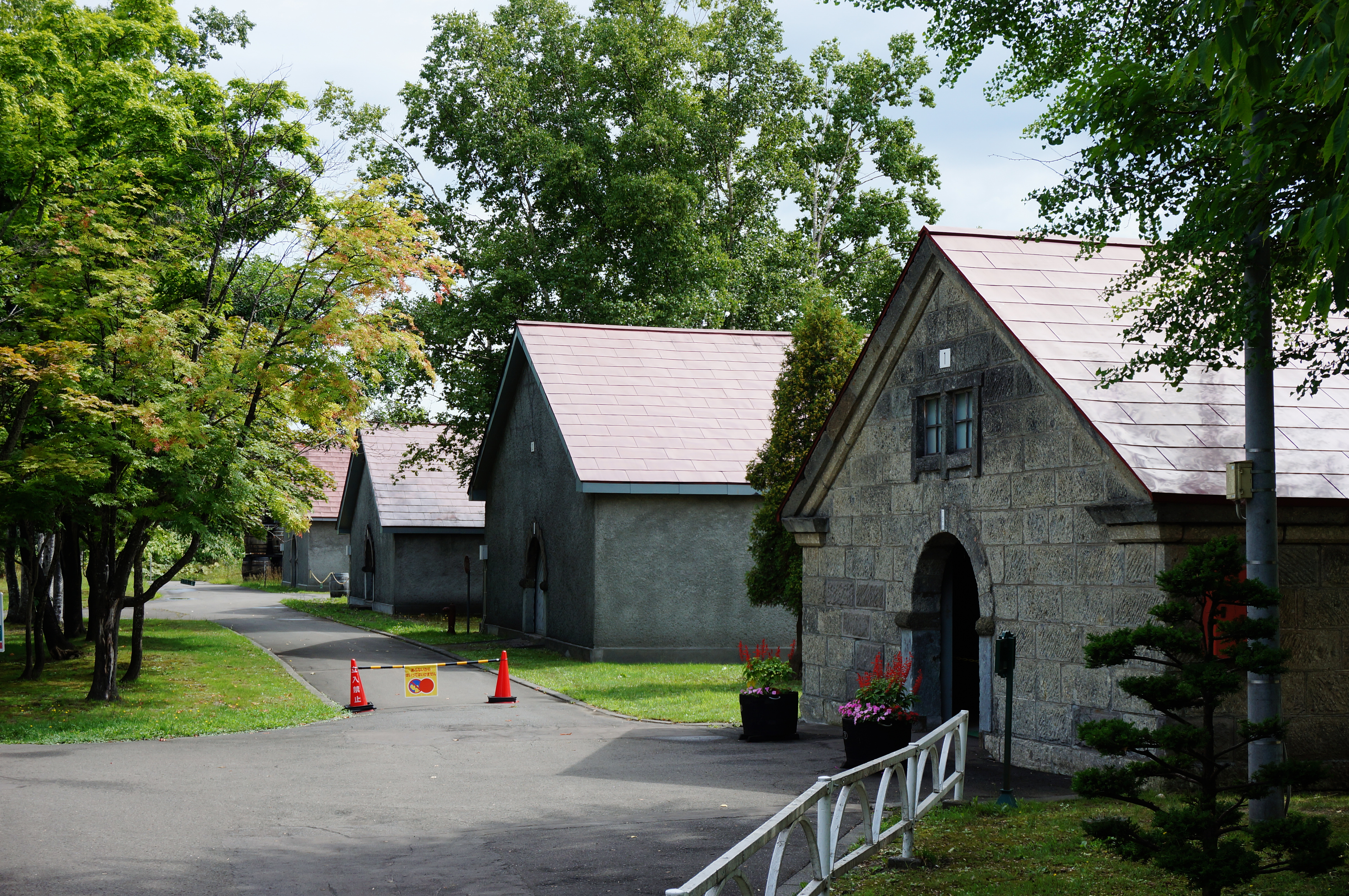
Yoichi Distillery

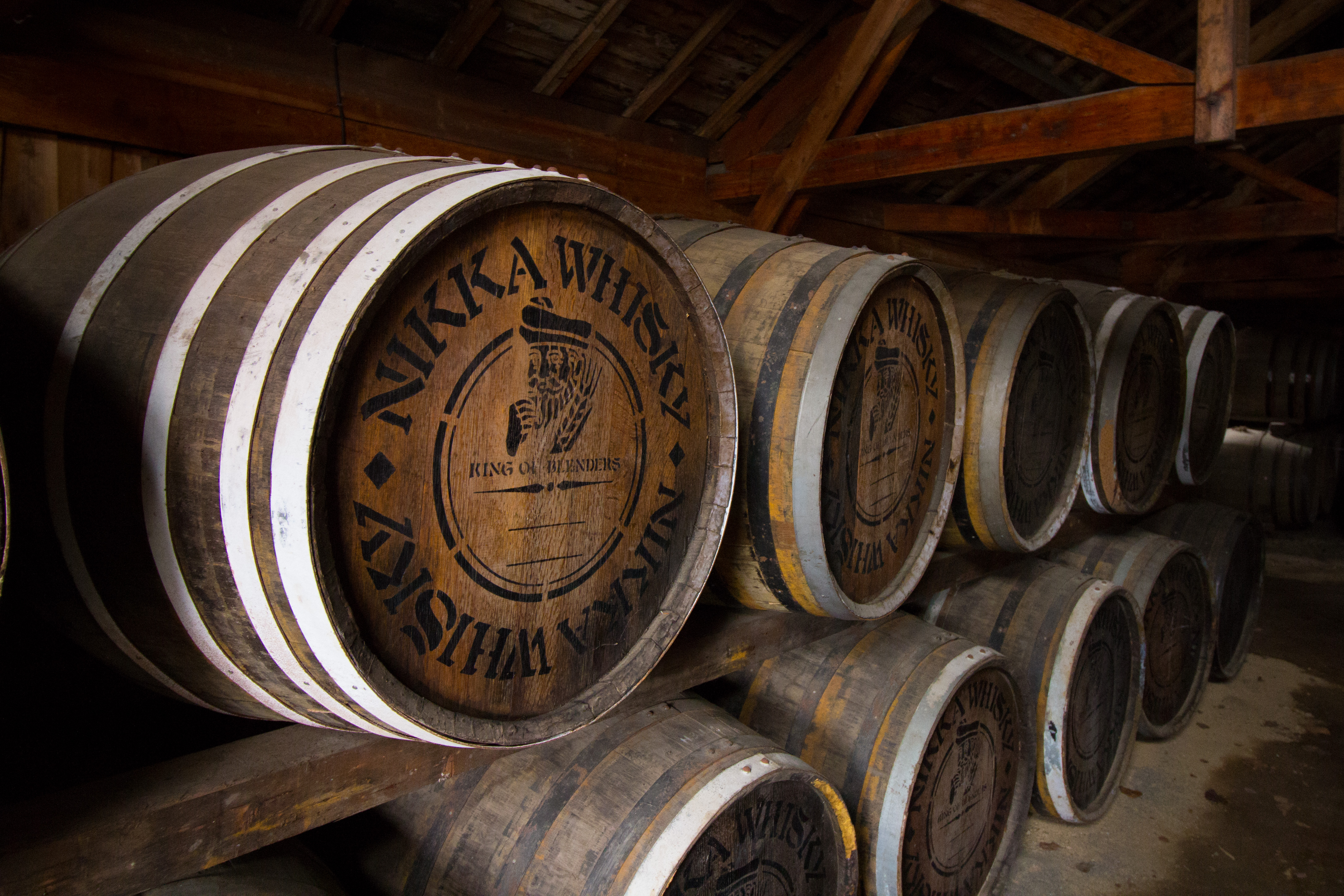
Yoichi distillery (2015)

- Yoichi distillery, Hokkaido Plant (Yoichi, Hokkaido) – malt whisky distilling, bottling
- Miyagikyo distillery, Sendai Plant (Sendai, Miyagi) – malt whisky distilling, grain whisky production, bottling
- Hirosaki Plant (Hirosaki, Aomori) – cider, brandy and wine brewing, distilling, bottling
- Tochigi Plant (Sakura, Tochigi) – grain whisky storage & ageing, re-storage of blended whisky
- Kashiwa Plant (Kashiwa, Chiba) – bottling
- Nishinomiya Plant (Nishinomiya, Hyogo) – liqueur bottling
- Moji Plant (Kitakyushu, Fukuoka) – shōchū distilling, bottling
- Ben Nevis distillery (Fort William, Scotland, UK) – Scotch whisky production
