= Keizo Saji =

Japanese businessman and art patron

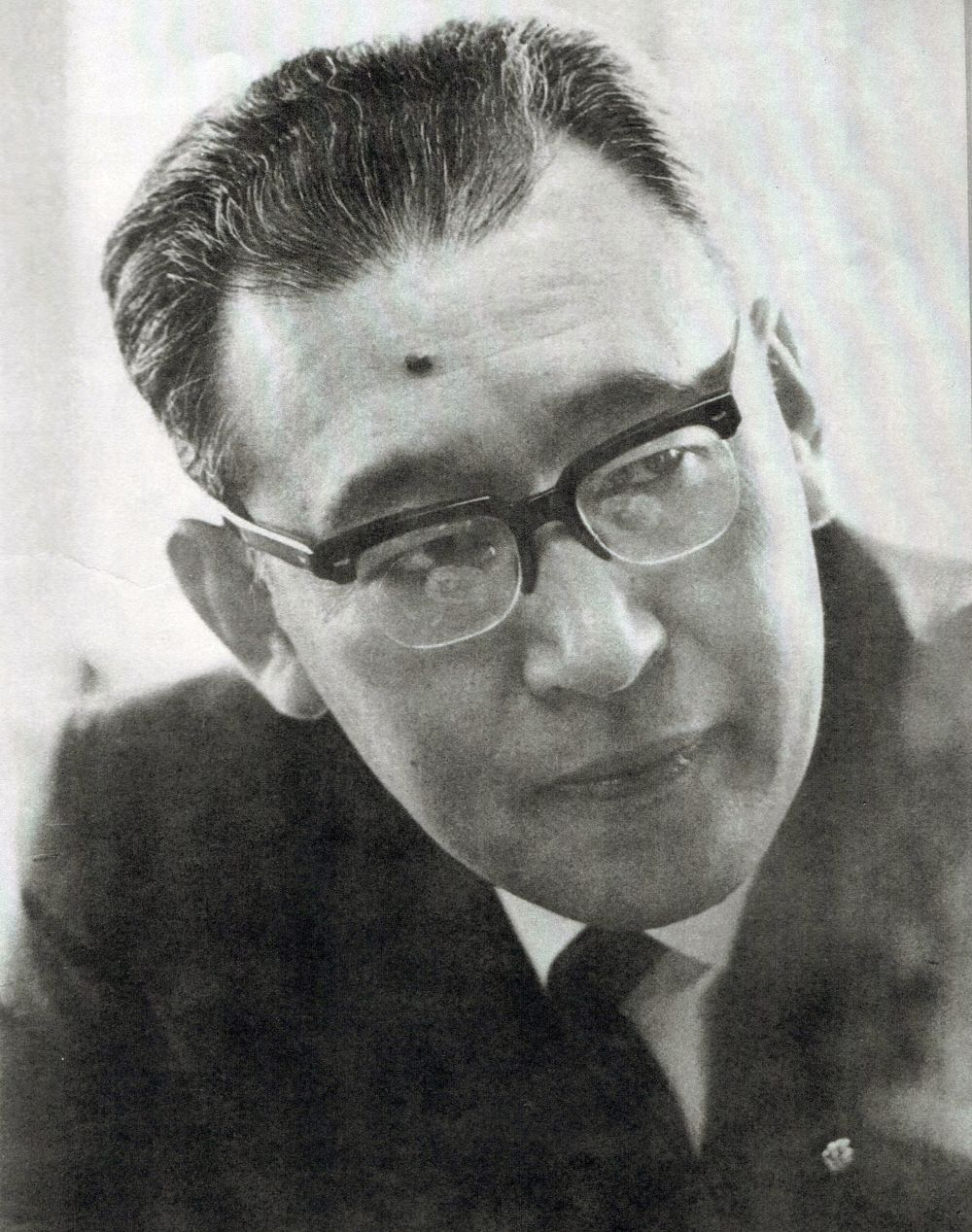
Keizō Saji

Keizō Saji (佐治敬三, Saji Keizō) (November 1, 1919 – November 3, 1999) was a Japanese businessman and art patron.

Saji founded the Suntory Museum of Art and Suntory Hall in Tokyo. He was Suntory’s second president (after his father, Shinjirō Torii, the company’s founder) and later served as chairman. He also supported basic scientific research through initiatives associated with the Suntory Foundation for Life Sciences. He held the court rank of Senior Third Rank (正三位).

He was ranked by Forbes in 1987 as the tenth richest person in the world, with an estimated net worth of US$4.0 billion.

== Early life and education ==
Keizō Saji was born in Osaka in 1919, the son of Shinjirō Torii, founder of Suntory. Around 1932, he was formally adopted by relatives on his mother’s side and assumed the surname Saji, though he continued to reside with his biological parents in Osaka. In 1940, his elder brother died.

Raised in a merchant household during Japan’s interwar period, Saji was educated in Osaka before later entering the family business. His upbringing in Osaka, including his continued identification with the city’s merchant culture, influenced both his managerial style and public persona. Like his father he was proud of his Osaka roots and never gave up his strong Osaka accent when speaking and writing.

== Family ==
Around 1932, he was adopted by relatives on his mother’s side and assumed the surname Saji. While this was a formal adoption, he continued to reside with his biological parents in Osaka. This adoption allowed him to be given a court rank and be listed in the peerage.

Saji married the third daughter of the engineer Yuzuru Hiraga. She died at the age of 21 shortly after giving birth to their eldest son, Saji Nobutada. He later remarried, taking as his second wife a daughter of Kensaku Ōhira, former president of Sumitomo Bank.

Nobutada, born to his first wife, served as President and Representative Director of Suntory and later served as chairman.

Harue, Saji’s daughter by his second wife, is married to the cellist Tsuyoshi Tsutsumi. She received the 44th Yomiuri Prize for Literature for her play Kana-dehon Hamlet.

== Cultural patronage ==
Beyond business leadership, Saji played a central role in establishing Suntory as a major corporate patron of the arts in postwar Japan. He founded the Suntory Museum of Art and later supported the establishment of Suntory Hall, which became one of Tokyo’s leading concert venues. Through the Suntory Music Award, he promoted contemporary music and international cultural exchange.

Saji’s approach reflected a broader postwar pattern in which large Japanese corporations invested in cultural institutions as part of corporate identity formation. Under his leadership, Suntory cultivated an image associated with aesthetic refinement and intellectual engagement, linking its brand to both Western classical traditions and Japanese artistic heritage.

== Relationship with Kaikō Takeshi ==
Saji maintained a notable professional and intellectual relationship with the writer Kaikō Takeshi. The two figures collaborated in advertising and public-facing cultural initiatives associated with Suntory. Their relationship has been described as an example of the intersection between corporate leadership and literary culture in late twentieth-century Japan.

Biographical accounts have highlighted the dynamic between Saji’s corporate authority and Kaikō’s literary sensibility, suggesting that their collaboration contributed to the development of a distinctive advertising style that combined narrative sophistication with commercial appeal.

== Leadership at Suntory ==
Saji assumed leadership of Suntory during Japan’s period of rapid postwar economic growth. Succeeding his father, Shinjirō Torii, he expanded the company from a domestic wine and spirits producer into one of Japan’s leading beverage conglomerates. Under his presidency, Suntory strengthened its position in whisky production while diversifying into beer, soft drinks, and international markets.

During the high-growth decades of the 1960s and 1970s, Saji emphasized brand identity and marketing innovation. Suntory cultivated an image that linked its products to sophistication, Western modernity, and cultural refinement. The company invested heavily in advertising and celebrity endorsements, contributing to the popularization of whisky and other Western-style beverages among middle-class consumers in postwar Japan.

In the 1980s, during Japan’s asset bubble era, Suntory expanded its corporate profile internationally. In 1987, Saji was ranked by Forbes as the tenth richest person in the world, with an estimated net worth of US$4.0 billion.

Saji also integrated corporate leadership with cultural patronage, reinforcing Suntory’s identity as a company associated not only with beverages but also with the arts and scientific research.

Although Suntory remained a privately held and family-controlled company, Saji emerged as one of the most visible representatives of Japan’s corporate elite during the late twentieth century. His leadership coincided with a period in which Japanese consumer brands gained increasing international recognition.
