= Japanese whisky =

Type of distilled liquor produced in Japan

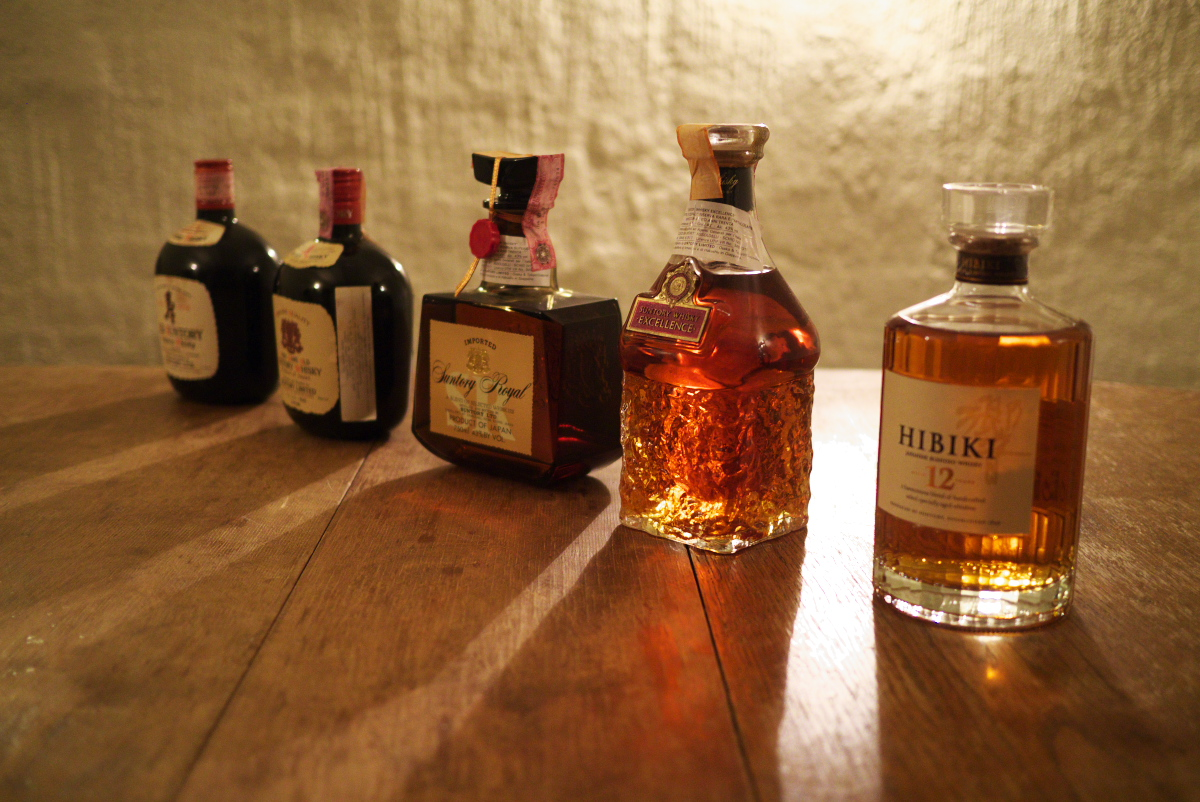
- A lineup of Suntory whisky bottles
- Type: Whisky
- Origin: Japan
- Introduced: c. 1870 (first commercially produced in 1923)
- Variants: Blended whisky; Grain whisky; Malt whisky
- Related products: Scotch whisky

Since the early 21st century, Japanese whisky has undergone rapid expansion and internationalization, supported by the growth of domestic distilleries, rising exports, and the introduction of industry-wide production standards. The origins of commercial whisky production in Japan date to the early 20th century, when Japanese producers began studying Scotch whisky-making techniques and adapting them to domestic conditions. Early development was shaped by the transfer of technical knowledge from Scotland, combined with experimentation using local water sources, climate conditions, and maturation environments.

Commercial production expanded gradually during the interwar and postwar periods, but domestic demand declined in the late 20th century, leading to consolidation within the industry. A renewed global interest in Japanese whisky emerged in the early 21st century, driven in part by international awards and increased visibility in overseas markets. This resurgence prompted significant reinvestment in production capacity and the opening of new distilleries across Japan.

The number of whisky distilleries in Japan increased sharply during the 2010s and 2020s, reflecting renewed domestic demand and growing international interest in Japanese whisky. While only a small number of distilleries were active at the beginning of the 21st century, industry surveys and specialist guides report more than 50 whisky producers nationwide and over 100 distillery sites in operation or development by the mid-2020s, including a significant rise in small-scale and regional craft distilleries. Despite this diversification, production volume and international distribution continue to be dominated by Suntory and Nikka Whisky, both of which operate multiple long-established distilleries and control a large share of global exports. Japanese whisky production is traditionally modeled on Scotch whisky, employing malted barley, pot still distillation, and oak cask maturation. However, Japanese producers typically emphasize in-house production diversity rather than inter-distillery blending, resulting in a wide range of spirit styles produced within individual companies.

== Production ==
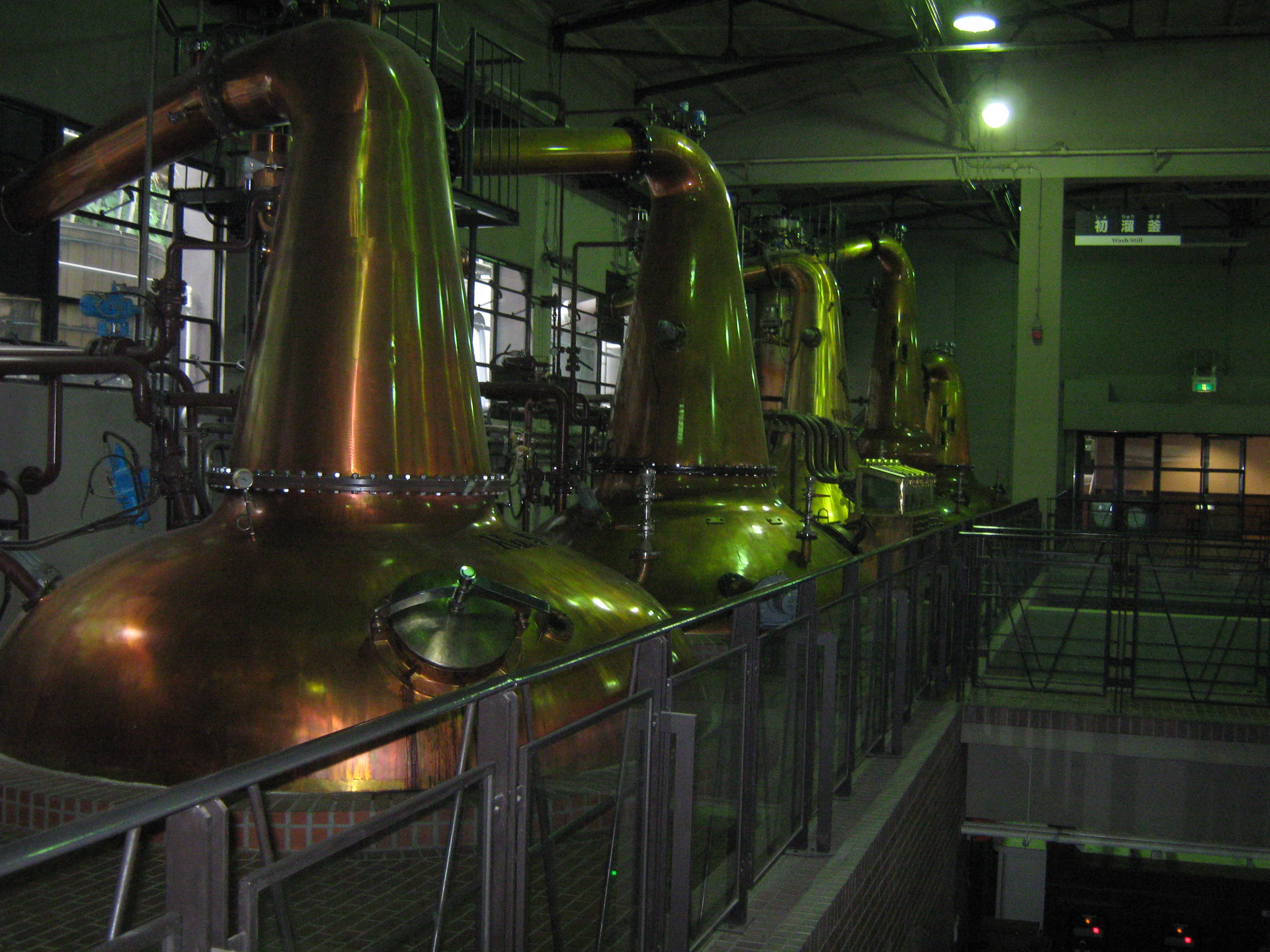
Copper pot stills at the Yamazaki whisky distillery.

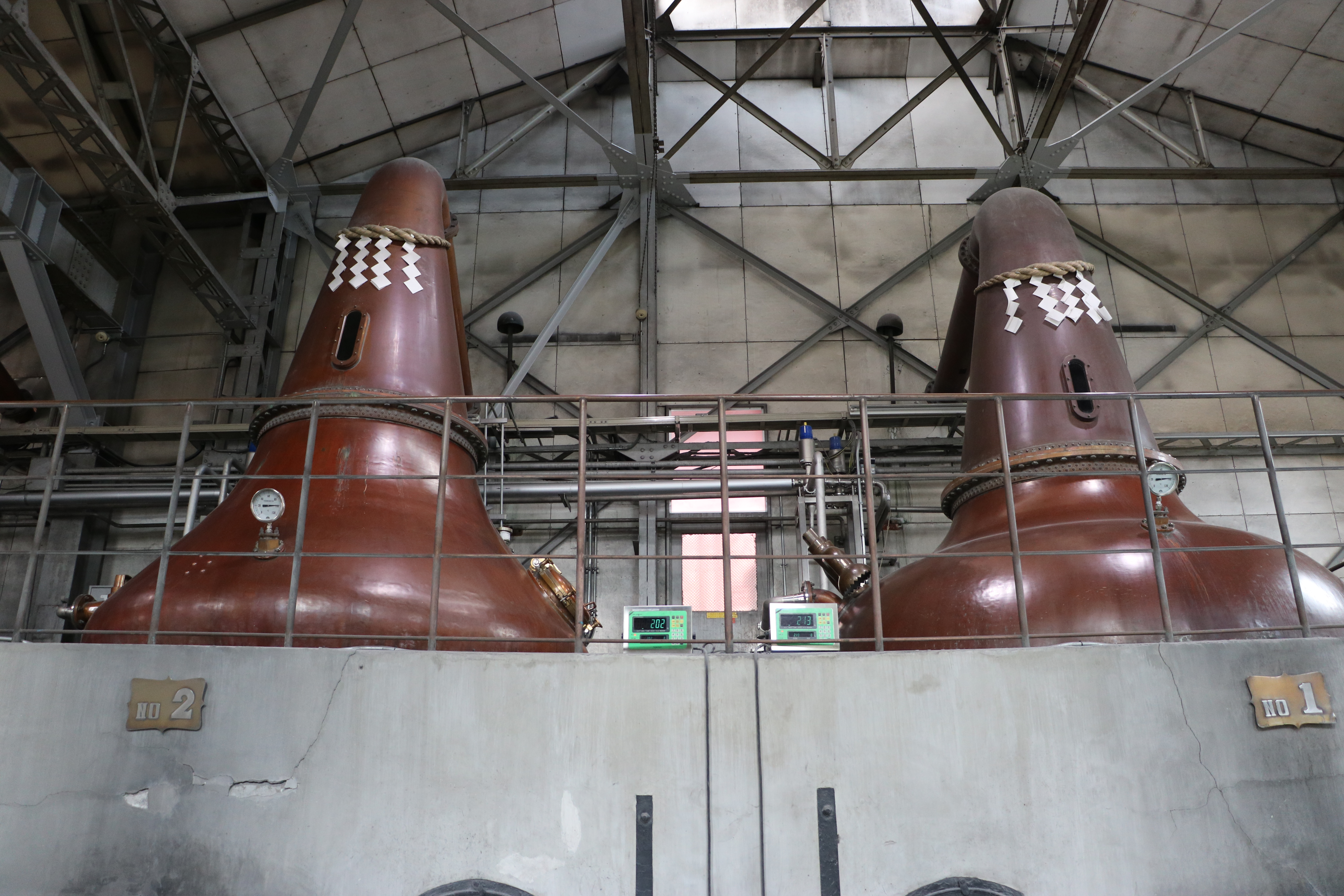
Copper pot stills at the Yoichi whisky distillery.

Maturation practices in Japan vary according to regional climate, with temperature fluctuations contributing to relatively rapid interaction between spirit and cask. While a variety of cask types are used, including ex-bourbon and sherry casks, Japanese oak (Quercus mongolica var. crispula, commonly known as mizunara) has been employed selectively for long-term maturation, contributing distinctive aromatic characteristics. according to whisky authority David Broom, the aroma and taste is reminiscent of aloeswood and similar to sandalwood with hint of coconut, camphor mintiness, cinnamon, and cedar. The link between the aroma of mizunara and temples is often referred to as "temple smell".

== Industry and regulation ==
=== Production standards ===
For much of its history, the term “Japanese whisky” lacked a formal legal definition, allowing products distilled outside Japan but bottled domestically to be marketed using the designation. As international demand increased during the 2010s, this practice attracted criticism from consumers and industry observers concerned with transparency and authenticity.

In response, the Japan Spirits & Liqueurs Makers Association (JSLMA) introduced voluntary industry standards in 2021 defining Japanese whisky based on criteria including fermentation, distillation, maturation, and bottling within Japan, as well as the use of Japanese water. Although these standards are not codified in national law, they have been widely adopted by major producers and are increasingly treated as the de facto definition of the category.

=== Industry structure ===
The Japanese whisky industry has diversified significantly since the early 21st century. While only a small number of distilleries were active at the beginning of the 2000s, industry surveys and specialist guides report more than 50 whisky producers nationwide and well over 100 distillery sites in operation or development by the mid-2020s, including a substantial increase in small-scale and regional craft distilleries.

Despite this diversification, production volume and international distribution remain dominated by a small number of large producers, particularly Suntory and Nikka, both of which operate multiple long-established distilleries and control a significant share of exports.

== Economic and cultural impact ==
Japanese whisky has become a significant component of Japan’s alcoholic beverage exports. Export values rose sharply during the 2010s and early 2020s, with whisky accounting for the largest share by value among exported Japanese alcoholic drinks. This growth reflected both increased global demand and the premium positioning of many Japanese whisky brands.

Within Japan, whisky distilleries have increasingly functioned as sites of cultural tourism, offering visitor centers, museums, and guided tours. The establishment of new regional distilleries has also been associated with local economic development and broader trends in craft production and rural revitalization.

Culturally, Japanese whisky is often discussed in relation to ideas of craftsmanship, technical precision, and the adaptation of foreign traditions within a Japanese context, positioning it alongside other internationally recognized Japanese artisanal products.

== Style ==
The production of Japanese whisky began as a conscious effort to recreate the style of Scotch whisky. Pioneers like Masataka Taketsuru carefully studied the process of making Scotch whisky, and went to great lengths in an attempt to recreate that process in Japan. Taketsuru chose the location of Yoichi in Hokkaidō primarily for its terrain and climate, which were in many ways reminiscent of Scotland (although financial constraints resulted in the first distillery actually being built in the more convenient location of Yamazaki on the main island). However, because smoky flavors characteristic of Scotch whisky were entirely unfamiliar to Japanese consumers at the time and were met with strong resistance, throughout the history of Japanese whisky many expressions have tended to restrain smokiness, instead emphasizing lighter and fruitier flavor profiles.

From 2024, products labeled as "Japanese whisky" must conform to new regulations. Japanese whisky must be fermented, distilled, aged and bottled in Japan, use some portion of malted grain in its mash, and use water sourced from Japan.

One facet of the style of Japanese whisky comes from the way in which blended whisky is produced, and the differing nature of the industry in Japan. Despite the recent rise of interest in single malt whiskies, the vast majority of whisky sold in the world is still blended. In Scotland, while a particular brand of blended whisky may be owned by a company that also owns one or more distilleries, it is common for blended whisky bottlers to trade single malt whiskies. The components of a blend may involve malt whisky from a number of distilleries, which may be owned by different companies. In Japan, however, without this history of sharing among distilleries, the industry became vertically integrated, meaning whisky companies own both the distilleries and the brands of blended whiskies, because they need that variety of whisky styles and do not trade with their competitors. Thus, a blended whisky in Japan will generally only contain malt whisky from the distilleries owned by that same company.

== History ==
=== Beginnings ===
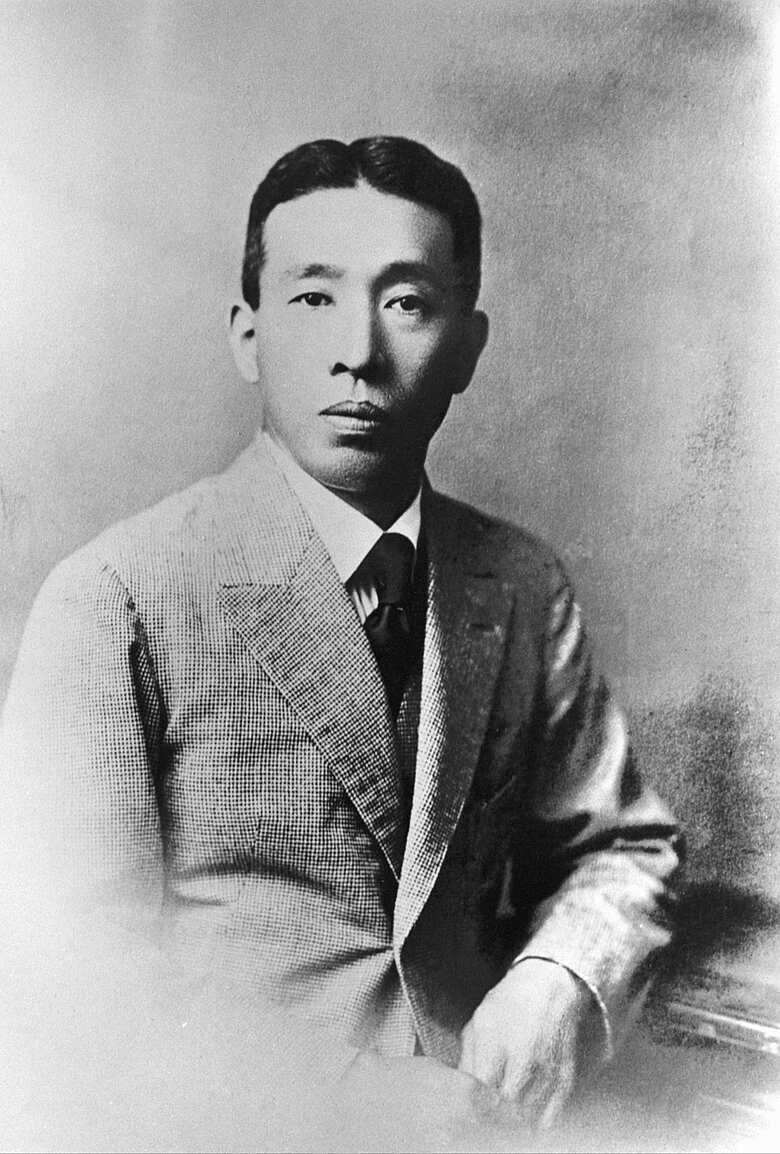
Shinjirō Torii

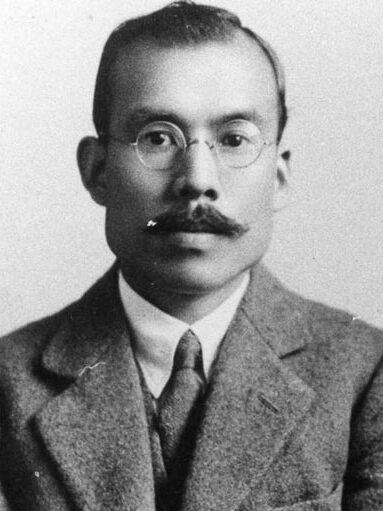
Masataka Taketsuru

Chemist Takamine Jōkichi, working in the United States in the 1890s, conducted important experiments with non-malt fermentation methods. In particular, he developed a koji-based distillation process (in contrast to the more common process that relies on malted barley) that demonstrated the technical feasibility of this process, but did not enter commercial whisky production at the time. The first westerners to taste Japanese whisky were soldiers of the American Expeditionary Force Siberia who took shore leave in Hakodate in September 1918. A brand called Queen George, described by one American as a "Scotch whisky made in Japan", was widely available. Exactly what it was is unknown, but it was quite potent and probably quite unlike Scotch whisky.

Two of the most influential figures in the history of Japanese whisky are Shinjirō Torii and Masataka Taketsuru, described as the "father of Japanese whiskey". In 1899, Torii established Torii Shoten, a business engaged in the import and sale of Western wines and spirits. In April 1919, Taketsuru began an apprenticeship at the Longmorn distillery in Strathspey, Scotland where he studied the process of Scotch distilling. He took another apprenticeship at the Hazelburn distillery in Campbeltown in 1920. Taketsuru brought this knowledge with him when he returned to Japan in November 1920.

In 1921, Torii founded Kotobukiya Co., Ltd. (a predecessor of Suntory). His first commercial success was with a brand called "Akadama Port Wine", based on a Portuguese wine the success of which established him as a successful merchant. However, he was not satisfied with this success and so he embarked on a new venture which was to become his life's work: making authentic Scotch-style whisky for the Japanese market. Despite strong opposition from the company's executives at the time, Torii decided to build the first Japanese whisky distillery in Yamazaki, a suburb of Kyoto, an area so famous for its excellent water that the legendary tea master Sen no Rikyū built his tearoom there. Torii had hired Taketsuru as a distillery executive. While working for Kotobukiya, Taketsuru played a key part in helping Torii establish the Yamazaki Distillery. In 1934, he left Kotobukiya to form his own company, Dainipponkaju, which would later change its name to Nikka. In this new venture, he established the Yoichi distillery in Hokkaidō. The first whisky made in Japan was the Suntory Shirofuda, released in 1929.

=== Postwar patterns ===
From the mid-1950s, the popularity of whisky began to increase, and the three major brands of Suntory, Daikoku Budoshu (later Mercian Corporation), and Nikka fought for the top position, leading to what was called the "whisky wars". From the 1960s, unique Japanese customs concerning whisky began to appear. Drinking whisky with Japanese food became popular, and the "Bottle keep" system took root in bars and izakaya, and drinking mizuwari (ja:水割り), a whisky diluted with 2 to 2.5 times the amount of water, became popular among the masses.

In the mid-20th century, Suntory in particular played a central role in shaping domestic whisky consumption in Japan through targeted marketing and retail strategies. Beginning in the 1950s, the company promoted the whisky highball—a mixture of whisky and carbonated water—as an accessible, food-friendly drink suited to everyday dining, contrasting with earlier associations of whisky as a luxury or Westernized beverage. This approach was reinforced through the expansion of the Torys bar chain, which offered standardized, affordable whisky drinks in casual settings and functioned as a key site for popularizing whisky among a broad urban clientele. Together, highball marketing campaigns and the Torys bars contributed significantly to the normalization of whisky consumption in postwar Japan and to the establishment of whisky as part of everyday drinking culture.

=== Marketing, legitimacy, and two trajectories ===
In accounts of postwar Japanese whisky, commentators often describe two partially overlapping trajectories in the category’s domestic consolidation: one oriented toward cultural diffusion through retail and on-premise marketing (especially the integration of whisky into everyday dining and izakaya settings), and another oriented toward technical authority and production lineage, in which place and method function as markers of authenticity and stylistic identity.

One prominent example of the first trajectory is Suntory’s highball-focused repositioning of blended whisky in the late 2000s. Although whisky highballs were already promoted in the postwar period—most notably through Suntory’s Torys bar chain in the 1950s and 1960s—the late-2000s “highball boom” is best understood as a revival rather than an origin. While the Torys bar phenomenon changed drinking habits in Japan, industry commentary emphasizes that the later campaign differed in scale and context, repositioning the highball nationwide as a standardized, meal-compatible drink after decades of declining whisky consumption. Further, Suntory’s strategy can be seen as a deliberate effort to re-situate whisky within mealtime drinking—particularly in izakaya—by promoting a standardized whisky-and-soda serve (“highball”) and building the bar infrastructure to deliver it at scale.

A frequently cited example of the second trajectory is Nikka’s self-positioning through production narrative and site selection. Nikka’s Yoichi distillery, established in 1934 by Masataka Taketsuru, was purposefully located in Yoichi, Hokkaido, because Taketsuru found there an environment with climatic and natural conditions—such as a cool climate, crisp air, and abundant water resources—reminiscent of the Scotch whisky regions where he had studied in Scotland. Nikka’s Yoichi distillery, established in 1934 by Taketsuru Masataka, has been repeatedly framed as an attempt to secure conditions comparable to Scotland, and the distillery has remained central to how Nikka is presented in terms of climatic suitability, continuity of technique, and malt-forward identity.

Complicating these trajectories is Takamine’s work on enzyme-based koji fermentation. This represents an early, largely independent strand of experimentation in alcohol production, emphasizing biochemical efficiency, and distinct from the later trajectories through which Shinjirō Torii and Masataka Taketsuru established Japanese whisky by prioritizing market integration and stylistic alignment with Scotch models.

These trajectories are often treated as complementary rather than mutually exclusive. One emphasizes the mechanisms by which whisky became routinized within everyday drinking culture through large-scale marketing, distribution, and on-premise integration—an approach widely associated with Suntory and frequently cited in industry commentary as influential not only within Japan but also in shaping contemporary global spirits marketing practices. The other emphasizes how legitimacy and stylistic authority were constructed and narrated through training, method, and place, a trajectory commonly associated with Nikka and Masataka Taketsuru’s Scottish apprenticeship, which commentators have argued was central to establishing Japanese whisky as a category taken seriously in international critical and professional contexts rather than as a domestic imitation.

=== 1970s onward ===
In 1971, various restrictions on the whisky trade were lifted, allowing Japanese importers to import foreign whisky without any quantity or value limits. 1973 saw Kirin Company enter the whisky business. In 1980, Suntory shipped 12.4 million cases of its "Suntory Old" and achieved the world's highest annual sales volume for a single brand. After reaching its peak in 1983, whisky consumption in Japan continued to decline, falling well behind Japanese beer, shōchū, and sake, and in 2008, only 20% of the 1983 level was consumed.

However, whisky consumption began to increase again around 2008 due to the highball craze, and the popularity of whisky increased dramatically in 2014 when the life of Nikka founder Masataka Taketsuru was portrayed in the NHK drama Massan (マッサン). In addition, Japanese whisky began winning awards in international competitions, and exports outside of Japan increased. As a result, demand for Japanese whisky has greatly exceeded supply since the 2010s, and production of many products has been halted. There are two reasons why the supply shortage of whisky has not been easily resolved. The first is that from 1983 to 2008, whisky consumption in Japan continued to decline and companies continued to reduce production, resulting in low inventories. The second reason is that whisky must be stored in casks for a long period of time in order to be finished, so even if companies increased the amount of whisky distilled, they would not be able to ship it immediately.

In 2008, Ichiro Akuto (ja:肥土伊知郎) started operations at the Chichibu distillery. It was the first time in 35 years that the Japanese government had granted a whisky production license to a new company. The Chichibu distillery won many awards at national and international competitions. The success of the Chichibu distillery led to an increase in the number of companies entering the whisky business, and whisky distilleries began to be built all over Japan.

By the 2020s, Japanese distilleries were importing spirits for use in blends. In 2021, the Japan Spirits & Liqueurs Makers Association announced the definition of "Japanese whisky" as the association's voluntary standard. The 82 companies that are members of the association are bound by this rule, and any whisky made in a manner that does not meet this definition cannot have the words "Japanese whisky" or words meaning Japanese whisky on the label. Also, if the label does not clearly state that the whisky does not meet the definition of Japanese whisky, it will not be allowed to depict the name of a place, person, or flag that evokes Japan. The grace period for this rule ended in 2024.

As of 2022, the value of Japan's alcoholic beverage exports was approximately 139.2 billion yen, with Japanese whisky in first place at 56.1 billion yen and sake in second place at 47.5 billion yen.

== Reputation ==
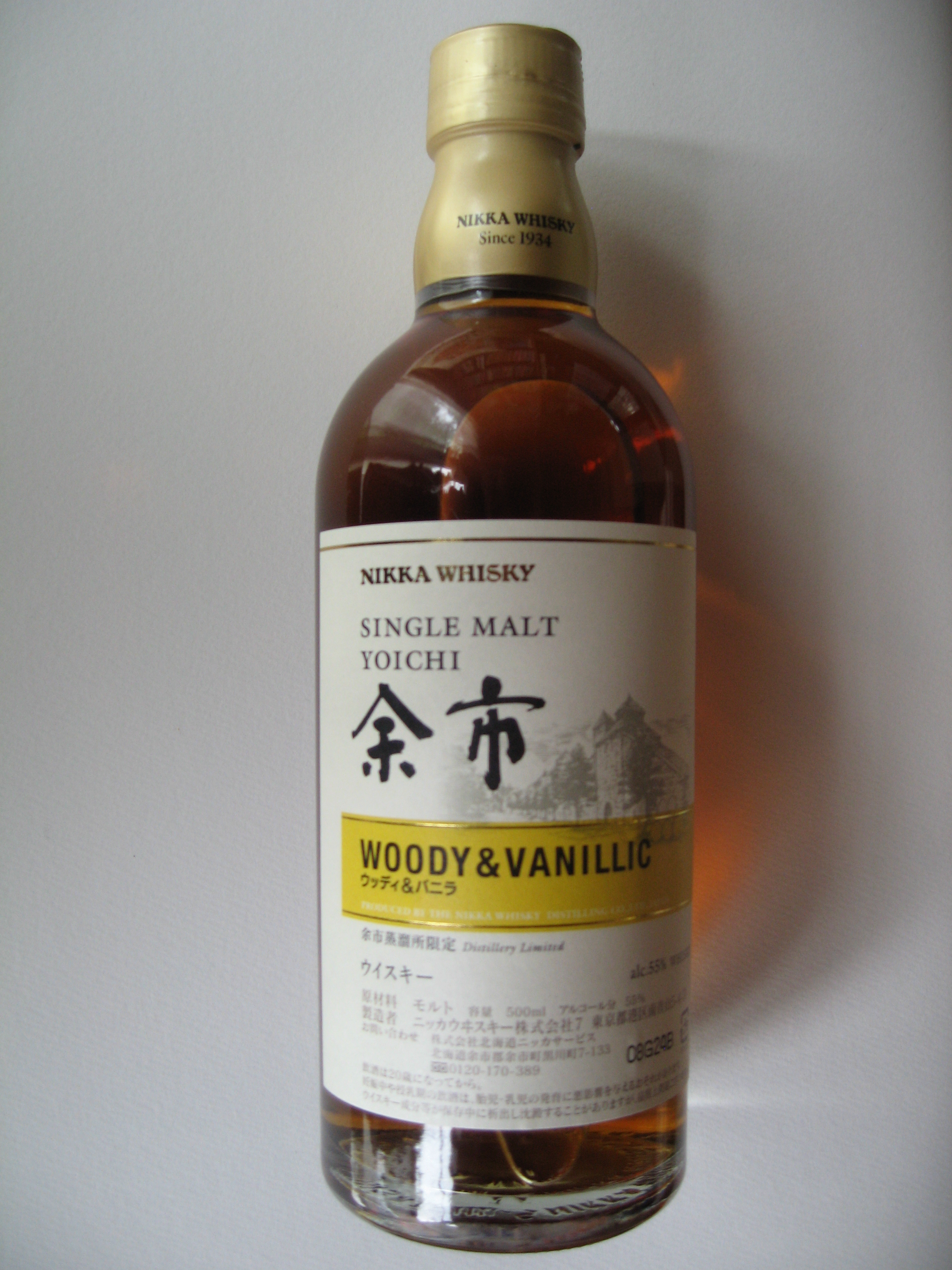
Nikka Yoichi single malt woody & vanillic

Before 2000, the market for Japanese whiskies was almost entirely domestic, though this changed in 2001 when Nikka's 10-year Yoichi single malt won "Best of the Best" at Whisky Magazine's awards.

In the blind tasting organized by Whisky Magazine in 2003, the results of which are published in WM #30, the winners of the category "Japanese Whiskies" were:

1. Hibiki 21 YO 43% (blend)
2. Nikka Yoichi 10 YO SC 59.9%
3. Yamazaki Bourbon Cask 1991 60%
4. Karuizawa 17 YO 40% (pure malt)

In the main ranking (covering all categories of whisky) Hibiki 21 YO made it to rank 9 and Nikka Yoichi 10 to rank 14.

In 2004, the 18-year-old Yamazaki was introduced to the US. Japanese whiskies have been winning top honors in international competitions, notably Suntory. At the 2003 International Spirits Challenge, Suntory Yamazaki won a gold medal, and Suntory whiskies continued to win gold medals every year through 2013, with all three malt whiskies winning a trophy (the top prize) in either 2012 (Yamazaki 18 years old and Hakushu 25 years old) or 2013 (Hibiki 21 years old), and Suntory itself winning distiller of the year in 2010, 2012, and 2013. The resultant acclaim nudged Japan's distilleries to market overseas.

Japanese whisky has won the world's highest award in some category at the World Whiskies Awards, organized by Whisky Magazine, every year from the inaugural event in 2007 until 2025. Whisky Magazine has organized a series of blind tastings which have included Japanese single malts in the lineup, along with malts from distilleries considered to be among the best in Scotland. On more than one occasion, the results have had Japanese single malts (particularly those of Nikka's Yoichi and Suntory's Yamazaki) scoring higher than their Scottish counterparts.

Whisky produced by Venture Whisky Co., Ltd., which owns the Chichibu distillery, has also been highly regarded, winning category-specific World’s Best awards seven times between 2017 and 2025 in competitions organized by Whisky Magazine.

In 2022, the Akkeshi distillery won the top prize in the World's Best Blended category and the Asaka distillery won the top prize in the World's Best Blended Malt category at a competition organized by Whisky Magazine.

The growing popularity of Japanese whisky has driven up prices, especially for rarer products. In August 2018, a 50-year-old Yamazaki first edition went for record $343,000 at a Bonhams auction in Hong Kong. In early 2020, Suntory raffled off 100 bottles of Yamazaki 55-year-old in Japan for three million yen ($20,700) each. One of those bottles sold for about $800,000 at a Hong Kong auction in August of that year; in August 2022, "Joker", a whisky made by Akuto Ichiro (ja:肥土伊知郎), which operates the Chichibu distillery, using Hanyu distillery's original whisky, sold for HK$500,000.

On 30 May 2026, a bottle of Yamazaki 50 Year Old was sold for $1,050,000 at a Bonhams auction, setting a new record for the highest price ever achieved by a Japanese whisky.

== Distilleries ==
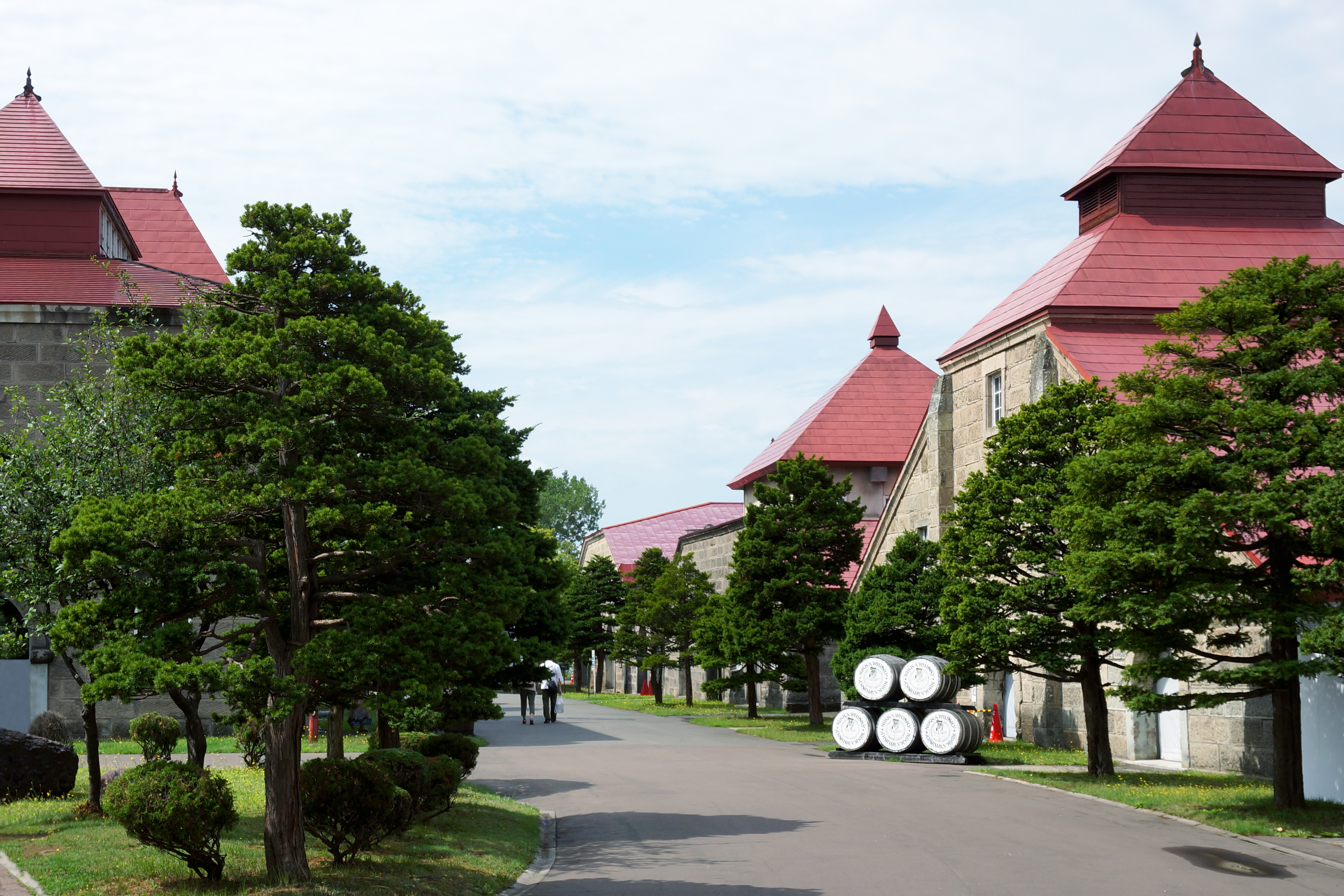
Nikka Whisky Yoichi Distillery, Yoichi, Hokkaido

In 2008, the Chichibu distillery (ja:ベンチャーウイスキー) began operations. It was the first time in 35 years that the Japanese government had granted a new whisky production license. The success of the Chichibu distillery has prompted companies that make sake and shōchū, as well as companies from other industries, to enter the whisky business, and distilleries are being built all over Japan. In addition, companies that had stopped distilling due to a decrease in demand for whisky resumed distilling or started operating new distilleries. As of 2011, when the Shinshu Mars distillery reopened, there were around nine active whisky distilleries in Japan. As of October 2022, there are 59 whisky distilleries in Japan, including those under construction and planned. The distilleries as of 2022 include:

=== In operation since before 2008 ===
- Yamazaki: owned by Suntory. Located between Osaka and Kyoto on the main island of Honshū.
- Hakushu: also owned by Suntory. Located in Yamanashi Prefecture.
- Chita: owned by Suntory. Located at the Port of Nagoya Sun Grain facility in Chita, Aichi Prefecture.
- Yoichi: owned by Nikka. Located in Yoichi on the northern island of Hokkaidō.
- Miyagikyo (formerly Sendai): also owned by Nikka. Located in the north of the main island, near the city of Sendai, Miyagi Prefecture.
- Fuji Gotemba: owned by Kirin. Located at the foot of Mount Fuji in Shizuoka Prefecture.
- White Oak: owned by Eigashima Shuzō. Located in Hyōgo Prefecture.

=== Operating and re-operating after 2008 ===
- Chichibu

- Chichibu: near Chichibu in Saitama Prefecture. This is the new Chichibu distillery, founded by Ichiro Akuto (ja:肥土伊知郎), grandson of the distiller at Hanyu. It opened in 2008.
- Chichibu Daini: This is the second distillery run by Ichiro Akuto. The distillation started in 2019.

- Akkeshi: owned by Japanese grocery wholesaler Kenten Co. Ltd. Located in rural Akkeshi on the island of Hokkaido, it opened in October 2016.
- Asaka: owned by Sasanokawa Shuzo Co., Ltd.. Located in Fukushima Prefecture. The company began whisky production in 1946, but stopped whisky production in 1989. The distillation restarted in March 2016.
- Chiyomusubi (Sakaiminato): owned by Chiyomusubi. Located in Tottori Prefecture. The distillation started in 2021.
- Fujihokuroku: owned by Ide Sake Brewery. Located in Yamanashi Prefecture. The distillation started in 2020.
- Fujisan: owned by Sasakawa Whisky Co., Ltd. Located in Yamanashi Prefecture. The distillation started in 2022.
- Hanyu: owned by Toashuzo., Ltd.. Located in Saitama Prefecture. The company began whisky production in 1946, but stopped whisky distillation in 2000. The distillation restarted in 2021.
- Helios (Nago): owned by Helios Distillery Co., Ltd.. Located in Okinawa Prefecture. The company began whisky production in the 1980s, but withdrew from the whisky business before 2008. The distillation restarted in 2016.
- Ikawa: owned by Juzan Co., Ltd. Located in Shizuoka Prefecture. The distillation started in 2020.
- Kaikyo: owned by Akashi Sake Brewery.. Located in Hyōgo Prefecture. The distillation started in 2017.
- Kamiki: owned by Kamiki Shuzo Nara Distillery. Located in Nara Prefecture.
- Kamui (Rishiri): owned by Kamui Whisky K.K. Located in Hokkaido Prefecture. The distillation started in 2022.
- Kanosuke: owned by Komasa Kanosuke Distillery Co., Ltd. Located in Kagoshima Prefecture. The distillation started in 2017.
- Kiyosuzakura (Kiyosu): owned by Kiyosuzakura Brewery Corp.. Located in Aichi Prefecture. The distillation started in 2014.
- Kobe: owned by GlowStars Inc. Located in Hyōgo Prefecture. The distillation started in October 2022.
- Komoro: owned by Karuizawa Distillers Inc. Located in Nagano Prefecture. Distillation started in July 2023.
- Kuju: owned by Tsuzaki Co., Ltd. Located in Ōita Prefecture. The distillation started in February 2021.
- Kurayoshi: owned by Matsui Shuzô. Located in the village of Kurayoshi, in Tottori Prefecture. The distillation started in 2017.
- Kyoto Miyako: owned by Kyoto Shuzo Co., Ltd. Located in Kyoto Prefecture. The distillation started in Jule 2020.
- Mars

- Shinshu Mars: owned by Hombo Shuzo Co., Ltd.. Located in Nagano Prefecture. The company began whisky production in Kagoshima Prefecture in 1953, in Yamanashi Prefecture in 1960, and at this distillery in 1985, but stopped whisky distillation in 1992. The distillation restarted in 2011.
- Tsunuki Mars: owned by Hombo Shuzo Co., Ltd. Located in Kagoshima Prefecture. The distillation started in 2016.

- Miyake Honten (Kure): owned by Miyakehonten Co., Ltd. Located in Hiroshima Prefecture. The distillation started in 2022.
- Nagahama: owned by Nagahama Roman Beer Co., Ltd.. Located in Shiga Prefecture. The distillation started in 2016. The brand name is "Amahagan".
- Niigata Kameda: owned by Niigata Shōkibo Jōryūjo. Located in Niigata Prefecture. The distillation started in September March 2019.
- Niseko: owned by Hakkaisan Brewery Co., Ltd.. Located in Niigata Prefecture. The distillation started in March 2021.
- Nozawa Onsen: owned by Nozawa Onsen distillery. Located in Yamanashi Prefecture. The distillation started in June 2022.
- Okayama: owned by Miyashita Sake Brewery Co., Ltd.. Located in Okayama Prefecture. The distillation started in 2015.
- Ontake: owned by Nishi Shuzo Co., Ltd.. Located in Kagoshima Prefecture. The distillation started in 2019.
- Osuzuyama: owned by Kuroki Honten Co. Ltd. Located in Miyazaki Prefecture. The distillation started in 2019.
- Rokkosan: owned by Axas Holdings. Located in Hyōgo Prefecture. The distillation started in June 2021.
- Sakurao: owned by Sakurao Brewery and Distillery Co., Ltd. Located in Hiroshima Prefecture. The distillation started in October 2018.
- Shindō: owned by Shinozaki Co., Ltd. Located in Fukuoka Prefecture. The distillation started in August 2021.
- Shinzato (Okinawa): owned by Shinzato Shuzo Co., Ltd. Located in Okinawa Prefecture. The distillation started in 2021.
- Shizuoka (ja): owned by Gaiaflow Co., Ltd. Located in Shizuoka Prefecture. The distillation started in October 2016.
- Takazo: owned by Meiri Shurui Co., Ltd.. Located in Ibaraki Prefecture. The company began whisky production in 1952, but withdrew from the whisky business before 2008. The distillation restarted in September 2022.
- Tanba: owned by Kizakura Co., Ltd.. Located in Hyōgo Prefecture. The distillation started in 2018.
- Wakatsuru Saburōmaru: owned by Wakatsuru Shuzo Co., Ltd.. Located in Toyama Prefecture. The company began whisky production in 1952. The distillery was renovated in 2016 and distilling resumed in 2017.
- Yamaga: owned by Yamaga Distillery Co., Ltd. Located in Kumamoto Prefecture The distillation started in August 2021.
- Yasato: owned by Kiuchi Brewery Inc.. Located in Ibaraki Prefecture. The distillation started in 2020.
- Yokokawa: owned by At star kabushiki kaisha. Located in Kagoshima Prefecture. The distillation started in January 2022.
- Yoro: owned by Gyokusendo Shuzo. Located in Gifu Prefecture. The company began whisky production in the 1970s, but withdrew from the whisky business before 2008. The distillation restarted in 2018.
- Yoshida Denzai: owned by Yoshida Denzai Kogyo Co., Ltd. Located in Niigata Prefecture. The distillation started in 2022.
- Yuwaku owned by Oriental Brewing. Located in Ishikawa Prefecture. The distillation started in August 2022.
- Yuza: owned by Kinryu Co., Ltd.. Located in Yamagata Prefecture. The distillation started in 2018.

Under construction/before operation

- Gakkōgawa: owned by Tatenokawa, inc. Located in Yamagata Prefecture. Distillation is scheduled to begin in September 2023.
- Hida Takayama: owned by Funasaka Shuzo. Located in Gifu Prefecture. Distillation is scheduled to begin in April 2023.
- Kōnosu: owned by Hikari distillery., Ltd. Located in Saitama Prefecture. Distillation is scheduled to begin in 2025.
- Takebe Orimono (Nanao): owned by Takebe Orimono. Located in Ishikawa Prefecture. Distillation is scheduled to begin in 2023.
- Akita: owned by Dreamlink Co. Ltd. Located in Akita Prefecture.
- Benizakura: owned by Hokkaido Liberty Whisky Inc. Located in Hokkaido Prefecture.
- Karuizawa: owned by Totsuka shuzo Co. Ltd. Located in Nagano Prefecture.
- Shinobu: owned by Niigata Beer Co. Ltd. Located in Niigata Prefecture.

=== Closed ===
- Karuizawa: owned by Mercian (a part of Kirin). Formerly located near the town of Karuizawa in Nagano Prefecture. Folded in 2011.

== Consumption ==
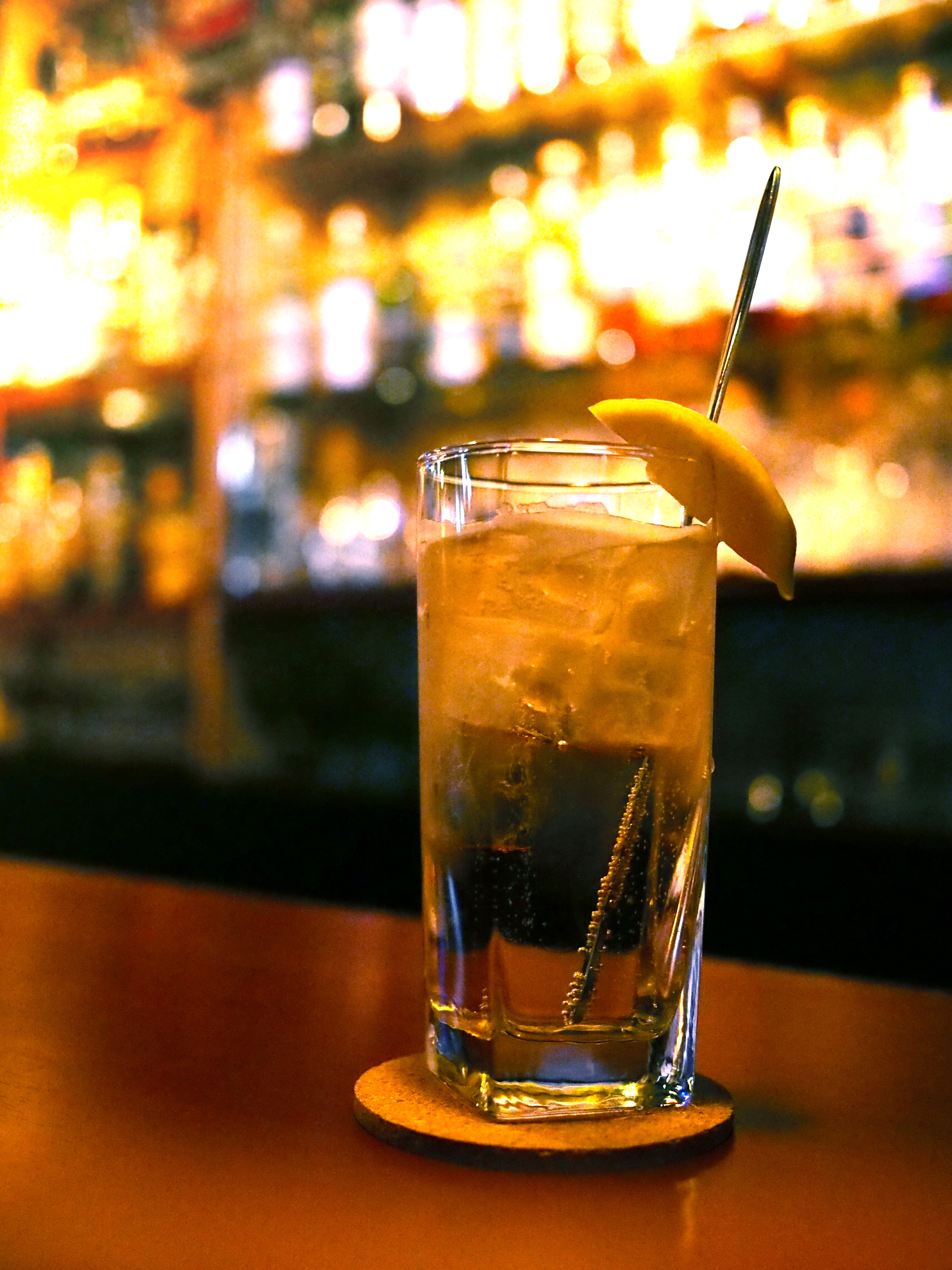
A whisky highball at a bar in Japan

Japanese whisky is consumed either like Scotch whisky or like Japanese shōchū. The bulk of Japanese blended whisky is consumed in cocktails, notably as whisky highballs (ハイボール, haibōru) (similar to shōchū highballs, known as chūhai), while fine whisky is primarily drunk neat or on the rocks, as with Scotch whisky. Advertising for blended whisky generally features it consumed in a highball, and highballs made with Suntory's Kakubin are branded kaku-hai (カクハイ).

In addition to soda (in a highball), Japanese whisky is often drunk mixed with hot water o-yu-wari (お湯割り), particularly in winter, or cold water mizu-wari (水割り), particularly in summer, as is done with shōchū. Whisky is also commonly drunk with food, particularly in mixed drinks, especially highballs. The prevalence of mixing whisky with soda or water is particularly attributed to the hot, muggy Japanese summer, hence the popularity of long drinks.

== See also ==
- Outline of whisky
- Izakaya
