= Hibiki (whisky) =

Japanese blended whisky

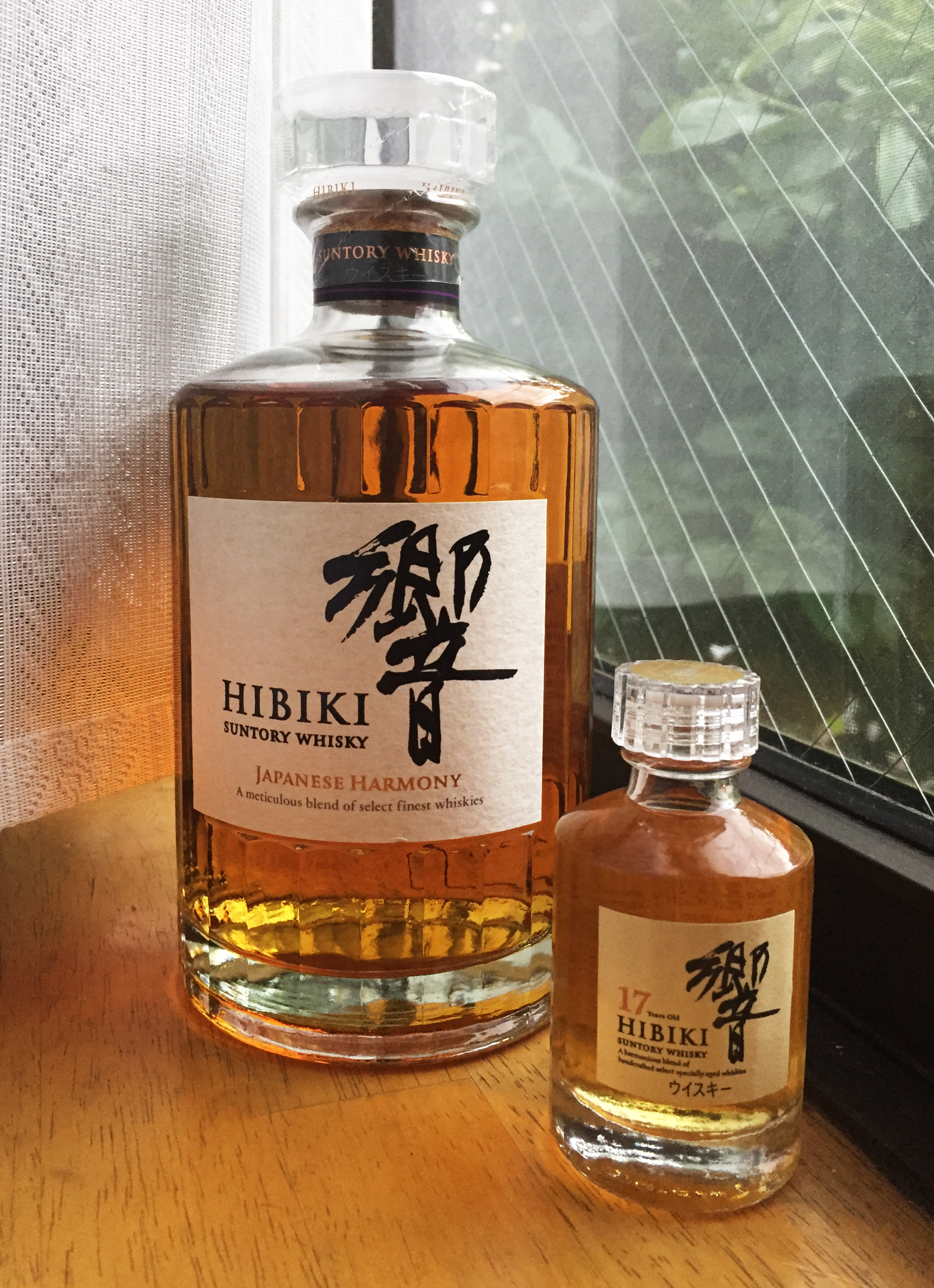
Hibiki Japanese Harmony (700ml) and Hibiki 17 years old (50ml)

Hibiki (Japanese: 響; lit. 'resonance' or 'echo') is a premium blended whisky produced in Japan by Suntory Global Spirits, a subsidiary of Suntory Beverage & Food Ltd, which itself is a subsidiary of Suntory Holdings of Osaka, Japan. It has won several awards.

== History ==
Hibiki was introduced in 1989 by Suntory, originally with expressions having age statements of 17 and 21 years. (In the convention for whisky age statements, the age stated is the age of the youngest whisky in the blend.) A 30-year expression was introduced in 1997, and a 12-year expression was introduced in 2009.

The Hibiki featured in the 2003 film Lost in Translation in which Bill Murray's character Bob Harris had to make a number of advertisements. Some credited its rareness with the demand that arose following the film.

In 2014, the brand was moved into an American-headquartered subsidiary called Beam Suntory when the subsidiary was created following the company's purchase of Beam Inc., the producer of the world renowned bourbon whiskey Jim Beam.

A new expression called "Japanese Harmony", with no age statement, was introduced in 2015. The new blend was said to use the same malt and grain whiskies used in the first Hibiki blend, being a blend of at least 10 malt and grain whiskies from three distilleries, aged in five different cask types, with some elements aged up to approximately 20 years.

As of October 2017, the brand was available in three variations (and the blends with age statements of 12 and 30 years were no longer listed on the company website):

- Hibiki 17 and 21 years old
- Hibiki Japanese Harmony (no age statement)

In May 2018, reports started coming out indicating the discontinuation of the Hibiki 17 expression. As of March 2024, the Hibiki 17 expression is no longer listed on the company website.

In 2023 for Suntory's 100th year anniversary, and 20 years after the appearance of Lost in Translation, director Sofia Coppola was asked to direct the company's anniversary tribute video starring Keanu Reeves, with a mix that included scenes from her film along with footage of her father Francis Ford Coppola and director Akira Kurosawa's Suntory Whiskey advertisement from the 1970s.

In May 2026, Hibiki launched their first global campaign, titled, "The Masterpiece of Japanese Artistry", including a cinematic film drawing parallels between kimono-making and whisky blending and featuring actress Anna Sawai.

== Blends ==
For producing the blends available as of 2010, more than 30 whiskies were used in the mix, including some that were aged more than 30 years and some that were aged in old umeshu casks. A bamboo charcoal filtering step has also been used. The company said the process "Gives it a very sweet and gentle flavor". In 2015, it was reported that at least 10 malt and grain whiskies were used from three distilleries (Yamazaki, Hakushu, and Chita), aged in five different cask types, with some elements aged up to approximately 20 years or longer. Three brand expressions are currently available as of October 2017.

Suntory collaborated with Japanese ceramic artist Tokuda Yasokichi III to create a limited edition bottle for a 35 year-old whiskey blend. The bottle, called "Hekiyo" has sold at auction for as much as $47,000 USD in 2021.

== In popular culture ==
The Hibiki whisky 17 Year Old was portrayed in Sofia Coppola’s 2003 film Lost in Translation, as a product endorsed by Bill Murray’s character Bob Harris.

In August 2024, a viral photo circulated on social media showing Indonesian Minister of Energy and Mineral Resources Bahlil Lahadalia seated with a bottle of Hibiki 21 Year Old whisky, a highly valued Japanese blend. The image attracted public and media attention for the luxury whisky bottle reportedly worth around Rp30 million (approximately USD 2,000), highlighting the whisky's prestige.
