= Yoho Brewing =

Japanese craft beer brewery

Yoho Brewing Company, Ltd.
- Type: Kabushiki Kaisha
- Industry: Brewing
- Founded: 1996; 30 years ago in Karuizawa, Nagano
- Area served: Asia
- Products: Craft beer
- Number of employees: 222 (as of July 2025)
- Parent: Hoshino Resorts
- Website: https://yohobrewing.com/en/

Yoho Brewing Company, Ltd. (stylized YOHO; Japanese: 株式会社ヤッホーブルーイング) is a Japanese craft beer manufacturing company headquartered in Karuizawa, Nagano with breweries located in Saku and Miyota, Nagano. It is the largest craft brewery in Japan. It was founded by Yoshiharu Hoshino in 1996.

== History ==
Yoho Brewing was founded by Yoshiharu Hoshino, an executive at Hoshino Resorts in 1996, after Japan's laws regarding brewing beer were changed in 1994. Hoshino wanted to produce ale style beer compared to the lager style beers that the major manufacturers produced. In August of 1996 they acquired a beer manufacturing license. However by 1999, the local beer boom in Japan was subsiding and business performance began to decline.

From 2004, Yoho Brewing began to focus on online sales. Naoyuki Ide learned how to create web pages and do internet marketing, and online sales began to take off. Ide later reasoned that their success might have come from switching from business-to-business sales, which involved wholesaling beer to retailers, to business to consumer sales, which allowed direct access to consumers via the Internet, which made it easier to convey information about their beer to consumers. During this time they also began to produce new types of beers driven by customer feedback.

In 2007, Yoho first sold an India pale ale (IPA) with a strong hops flavour for a limited time. This was the predecessor of the beer that later gained popularity as Indo no Aooni. IPAs were not well-known in Japan at the time. Hoshino opposed producing "an easier-to-drink (less bitter) beer". Hoshino stated, "If we make an easy-to-drink beer like the major companies, Yoho has no reason to exist," and "Yoho's mission is to provide variety to the Japanese beer market." Despite almost all employees opposing him, Hoshino pushed ahead with the IPA production. Indo no Aooni ended up selling well despite no major promotion. From 2008 to 2012, it was sold for limited times, but became a regular product in 2013. Over the next seven years, sales volume increased by 5 to 7 times, and it began to be sold in convenience stores.

In 2015 Kirin invested in the company with a 30% stake. By 2018 Yoho was the largest craft brewery in Japan. As of May 2023, the representative director and president is Naoyuki Ide.
