= Chichibu distillery =

Japanese whisky distillery

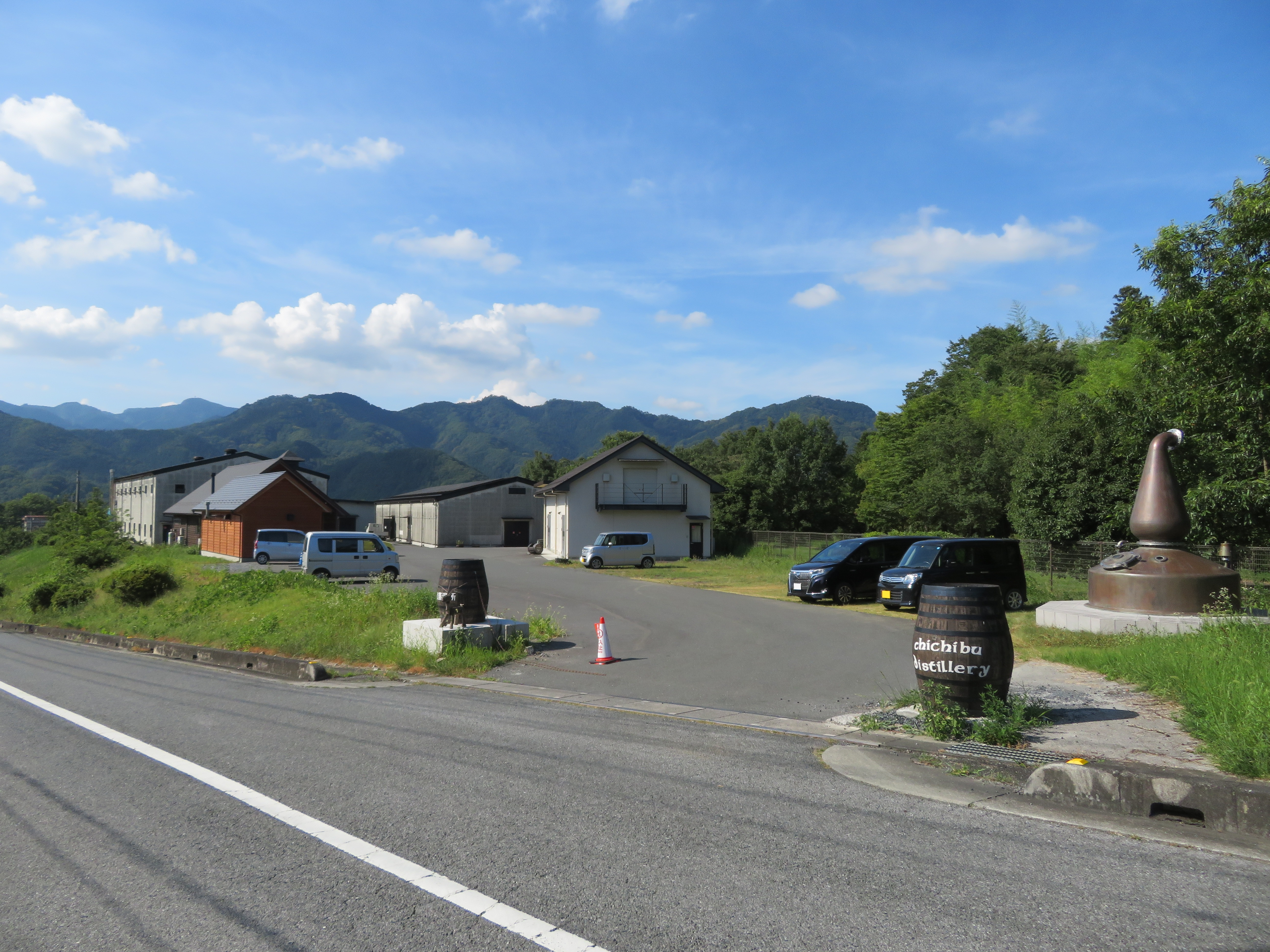

Region: Japan
- Location: Midorigaoka 49, Chichibu, Saitama, 368-0067
- Coordinates: 36°2′47.6″N 139°3′15.8″E
- Owner: Venture Whisky
- Founded: 2008
- Founder: Ichiro Akuto
- Status: Active
- No. of stills: 2 pot stills

Chichibu distillery (Japanese: 秩父蒸溜所, Hepburn: Chichibu jōryūsho) is a Japanese whisky distillery located in Chichibu (秩父市, Chichibu-shi), Saitama Prefecture, Japan. Operated by Venture Whisky Ltd., the distillery was established in 2007 and began production in 2008. It is one of three distilleries owned by Venture Whisky, whose principal brand is Ichiro's Malt.

Venture Whisky was founded in 2004 by Ichiro Akuto for the purpose of commercializing Ichiro's Malt, a whisky produced from the remaining stock of the Hanyu Distillery, which had been owned by Toa Shuzo Co., Ltd., the Akuto family's company, until its sale that year, as well as to eventually produce whisky at a distillery of its own. This plan later took shape as the Chichibu Distillery. Chichibu Distillery was the first distillery in Japan in 35 years to receive a new whisky production license from the government, and its success contributed to the revitalization of the Japanese whisky industry, leading to the establishment of new distilleries across the country.

== History ==
=== Pre-founding background ===
Ichiro Akuto was born in 1965 in Chichibu, Saitama Prefecture. He comes from the Akuto family, the 21st head of a lineage that owns Akuto Shuzo Honke (肥土酒造本家), a sake brewery founded in 1625 during the Edo period. The brewery, originally located in the area that corresponds to present-day Chichibu, was relocated to Hanyu, Saitama, during the generation of Akuto's grandfather, where it adopted the name Toa Shuzo Co., Ltd.[ja] and operated the Hanyu Distillery. After graduating from Tokyo University of Agriculture, Akuto joined Suntory and worked in its sales division. As the performance of Toa Shuzo deteriorated, his father asked him to help manage the business, and he moved to the company at the age of 29. The company's performance did not improve, and it entered civil rehabilitation proceedings in 2000. After fully assuming management responsibility in 2001, Akuto was forced to sell the company to Hinode Tsusho Co., Ltd.[ja] in 2004. At that time, Hinode Tsusho planned to dispose of the whisky stock from the Hanyu Distillery if no buyer could be found, so Akuto borrowed money from relatives to purchase the stock himself. With the cooperation of Sasanokawa Shuzo Co., Ltd.[ja] in Fukushima Prefecture, he succeeded in arranging for the whisky to be stored in the company's warehouses.

=== Venture Whisky era ===
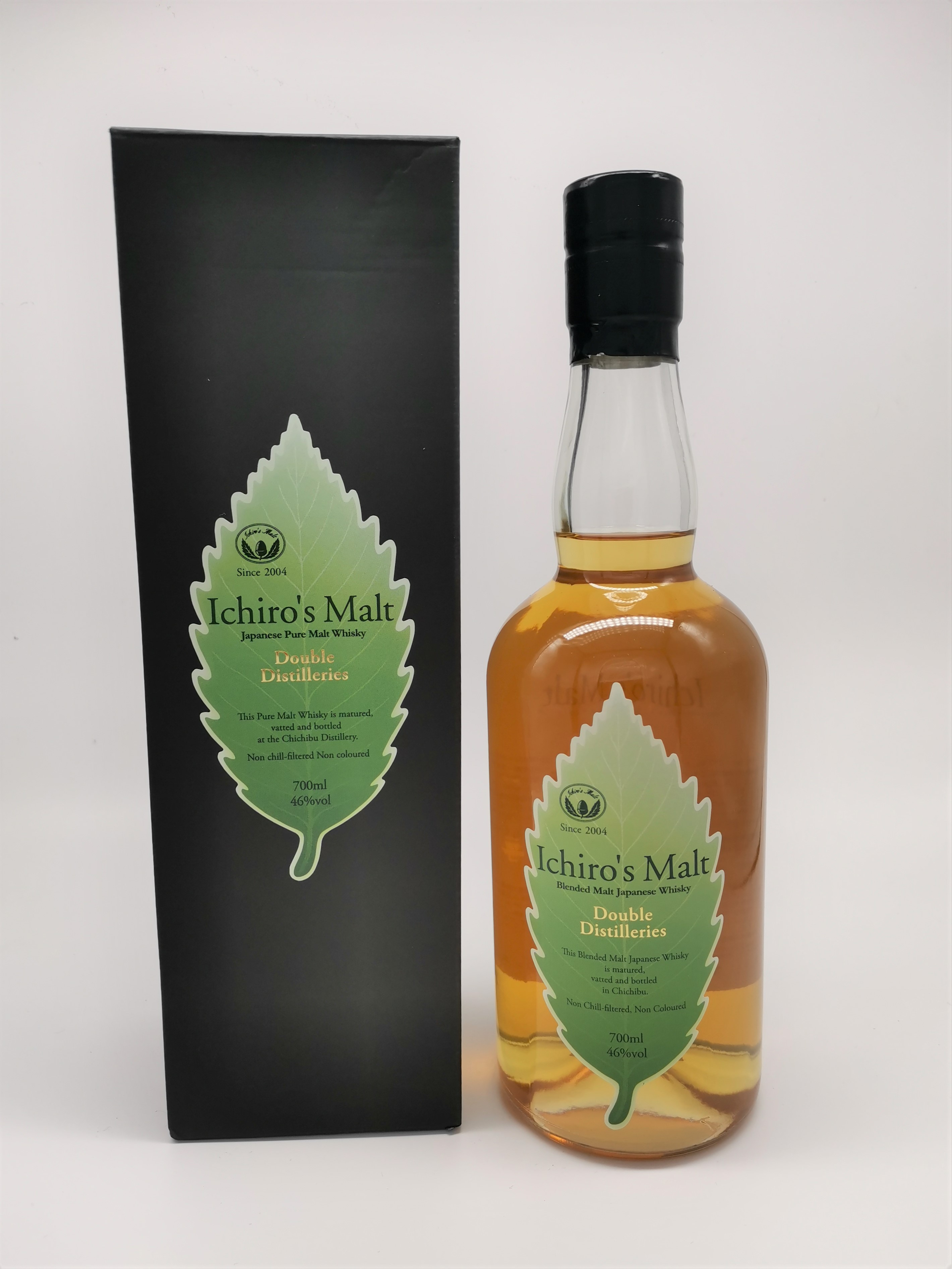
Ichiro's Malt Double Distilleries was produced as a blend of whisky from the Chichibu Distillery and the Hanyu Distillery from 2008 to 2025. Since November 2025, it has been made by blending whisky from the Chichibu Distillery and the Chichibu Daini Distillery.

In 2004, Akuto founded Venture Whisky Ltd., and began marketing Ichiro's Malt, a whisky produced using the Hanyu Distillery stock stored at Sasanokawa Shuzo. At the time, Akuto regularly visited Sasanokawa Shuzo as a technical advisor and oversaw the planning and blending of Ichiro's Malt, and it was therefore released through Sasanokawa Shuzo. Owing to limited funds, wine bottles produced by Sasanokawa Shuzo were used in place of dedicated whisky bottles, and the manufacturer's name printed on the bottles was that of Sasanokawa Shuzo. Sasanokawa Shuzo, inspired by Akuto's advice, subsequently established the Asaka Distillery on its premises in 2016 and resumed whisky distillation, which had previously been suspended.

In 2007, Akuto established the Chichibu Distillery in Chichibu, Saitama Prefecture. The distillery began operations in 2008 and released its first single malt whisky, Chichibu The First, in 2011. Following the release of this whisky, the Chichibu Whisky Matsuri (Chichibu Whisky Festival) was launched in 2014 and has been held annually since then. The event takes place at Chichibu Shrine and the Chichibu Jibasan Center (Chichibu Local Products Center), offering tastings of spirits from distilleries in Japan and abroad. In 2024, the festival attracted 4,000 attendees from both Japan and overseas.

In 2019, the Chichibu Daini Distillery began operations, located 600 meters from the original Chichibu Distillery. Its first single malt, Chichibu Distillery II, was released in 2025. The production capacity of the Daini Distillery is five times that of the original facility, and its pot stills employ direct firing instead of steam-based indirect heating, while its fermentation tanks are made of French oak rather than mizunara.

In January 2026, the Tomakomai Distillery commenced operations in Tomakomai, Hokkaido. The distillery produces grain whisky using a Coffey still and plans to increase overall production volume by blending it with malt whisky produced at two distilleries in Saitama Prefecture, with the aim of expanding sales overseas. The first whisky made using spirit distilled at this facility is scheduled to be released in 2029.

== Reputation and Awards ==
In 2007, King of Diamonds, released in 2005 and made using stock from the Hanyu Distillery, received the Gold Award, the highest rating in the Japanese malt category, from the British magazine Whisky Magazine.

In 2012, Chichibu The First, the first malt whisky produced from Chichibu Distillery stock, was named Japanese Whisky of the Year at Whisky Advocate's 18th Annual Awards in the United States.

In 2019, Akuto was named "Master Blender of the Year" at the International Spirits Challenge, an award presented to the world's top blender in the spirits industry for that year.

Between 2017 and 2025, whiskies such as Chichibu Whisky Festival 2017 and Ichiro’s Malt & Grain Blended Japanese Whisky, both produced with stock from the Chichibu Distillery, received the World’s Best awards in their respective categories seven times at the World Whiskies Awards organized by Whisky Magazine.

In March 2024, Whisky Magazine inducted Akuto into its Hall of Fame, making him the fifth Japanese figure to receive this honor. He was selected for establishing the first new whisky distillery in Japan in 35 years and becoming a leading figure in the Japanese whisky industry. The magazine cited his efforts to revive production techniques that had been fading during a period of industry stagnation, his technical innovations, his multiple award-winning whiskies, and his contributions to strengthening brand standards and improving the quality of Japanese whisky.

The Card Series, a set of 54 bottlings of Ichiro's Malt produced from the remaining stock of the Hanyu Distillery and released between 2005 and 2014, gained significant acclaim and has set multiple auction records. In 2015, 2019, and 2020, the series achieved the highest sale prices ever recorded for a whisky series at Bonhams auctions, with the 2020 sale reaching 1.52 million USD. In 2025, the Ten of Spades from the Card Series sold for 132,910 USD as a single bottle, marking the highest auction price recorded for any Ichiro’s Malt bottling.
