= Fuji Gotemba distillery =

- Location: Shibanuta 970 Gotemba, Shizuoka Prefecture, 412-0003; Japan
- Coordinates: 35°20′11.86″N 138°53′48.26″E
- Owner: Kirin Distillery Company
- Founded: 1972
- Status: Active
- Water source: Mount Fuji
- No. of stills: 4 pot stills
- Website: Fuji-Gotemba distillery (in Japanese)

Fuji Gotemba distillery (Japanese: 富士御殿場蒸溜所, Hepburn: Fuji Gotenba jōryūsho; sometimes Fuji-Gotemba distillery) is a Japanese whisky distillery owned by the Kirin group.

The distillery is situated in the city of Gotemba (御殿場市, Gotenba-shi; sometimes Gotenba), on the southeastern flank of Mount Fuji in Shizuoka Prefecture, Chūbu region, Japan. It is 620 m (2,030 ft) above sea level, and its water source is Mount Fuji. It was established in 1972 by Kirin Seagram Ltd, now the Kirin Distillery Company.

Gotemba was selected as the site for the distillery because it was felt to have the climate most similar to Scotland: the city is much cooler and less humid (especially in summer) than other areas of Japan, with an average annual temperature of around 13°C.
