= William Copeland (brewer) =

Norwegian-American brewer

- Born: Johan Martinius Thoresen; 10 January 1834; Tromøya, Norway
- Died: 11 February 1902 (aged 67); Yokohama, Empire of Japan
- Resting place: Foreign General Cemetery, Yokohama
- Occupation: Brewer
- Known for: Founding the Spring Valley Brewery

William Copeland (born Johan Martinius Thoresen; 10 January 1834 – 11 February 1902) was a Norwegian-American brewer. He was the founder of one of Japan's first beer breweries, Spring Valley Brewery in Yamate, Yokohama, in 1869. The brewery was the precursor to Kirin Brewery Company, one of Japan's largest domestic beer producers.

== Early life ==
Copeland was born Johan Martinius Thoresen on Tromøya island in Norway. In the 1840s, he worked for five years as an apprentice at Arendals Bryggeri a few blocks from his home before immigrating to the United States and changing his name to William Copeland.

== Work in Japan ==
Moving to Yokohama, Japan in 1864, Copeland first worked in the dairy business and then set himself up as a brewer in 1869 with the Spring Valley Brewery. It was located at the site of a natural spring next to the Amanuma Pond below the Yamate foreign residential neighborhood, where he dug a 210-meter cave into the side of a hill and used its low fixed temperature to help the beer mature. After Louis Pasteur invented pasteurization, Copeland was quick to adopt the new technique in his factory. Copeland produced three varieties of beer: a lager beer, a Bavarian beer, and a Bavarian Bock beer. His beer was principally sold in casks to local Yokohama taverns with a small amount of bottled beer being made available to foreign residents in Yokohama, and then was shipped to Tokyo and Nagasaki. He went back to Norway and married Anne Kristine Olsen in 1872. They lived in Japan but she became sick and died seven years later. Although Copeland showed talent as a beer brewer, he was a poor manager, and in 1884 Spring Valley Brewery was put up for public auction.

With the assistance of Scottish merchant Thomas Blake Glover, the Spring Valley Brewery was sold in early 1885 to a group of Japanese investors and renamed The Japan Brewery. German brewmaster Hermann Heckert was hired to oversee production. Glover was also instrumental in establishing a sales agency contract with Meidi-ya for the relaunched brewery, Kirin Beer, which was launched in May 1888.

William Copeland's grave, maintained by Kirin Brewery Company, is located in the Foreigner's Cemetery in Yamate, Yokohama. The site of the former Spring Valley Brewery is now occupied by Kitagata Elementary School. Monuments and water wells visible at the edge of the school grounds attest to the site's history.

== Revival of the Spring Valley Brewery Brand ==
In July 2014 Kirin Company, Limited announced its intention to revive the Spring Valley Brewery brand as a wholly owned subsidiary company to focus on producing and retailing microbrewery-style beers produced using traditional ingredients and brewing methods.

After internal debate about the strategy to pursue craft beer, in 2015 the company opened a new brewery/restaurant location in Daikanyama (Tokyo) on the newly cleared land of the formerly above-ground Tokyo rail line, which had been recently routed underground in 2013. As of 2022 the company has brewery/restaurant locations in Tokyo, Kyoto, and Yokohama

== See also ==
- Beer in Japan
