= Karuizawa distillery =

Whisky distillery in Japan

Karuizawa Distillery
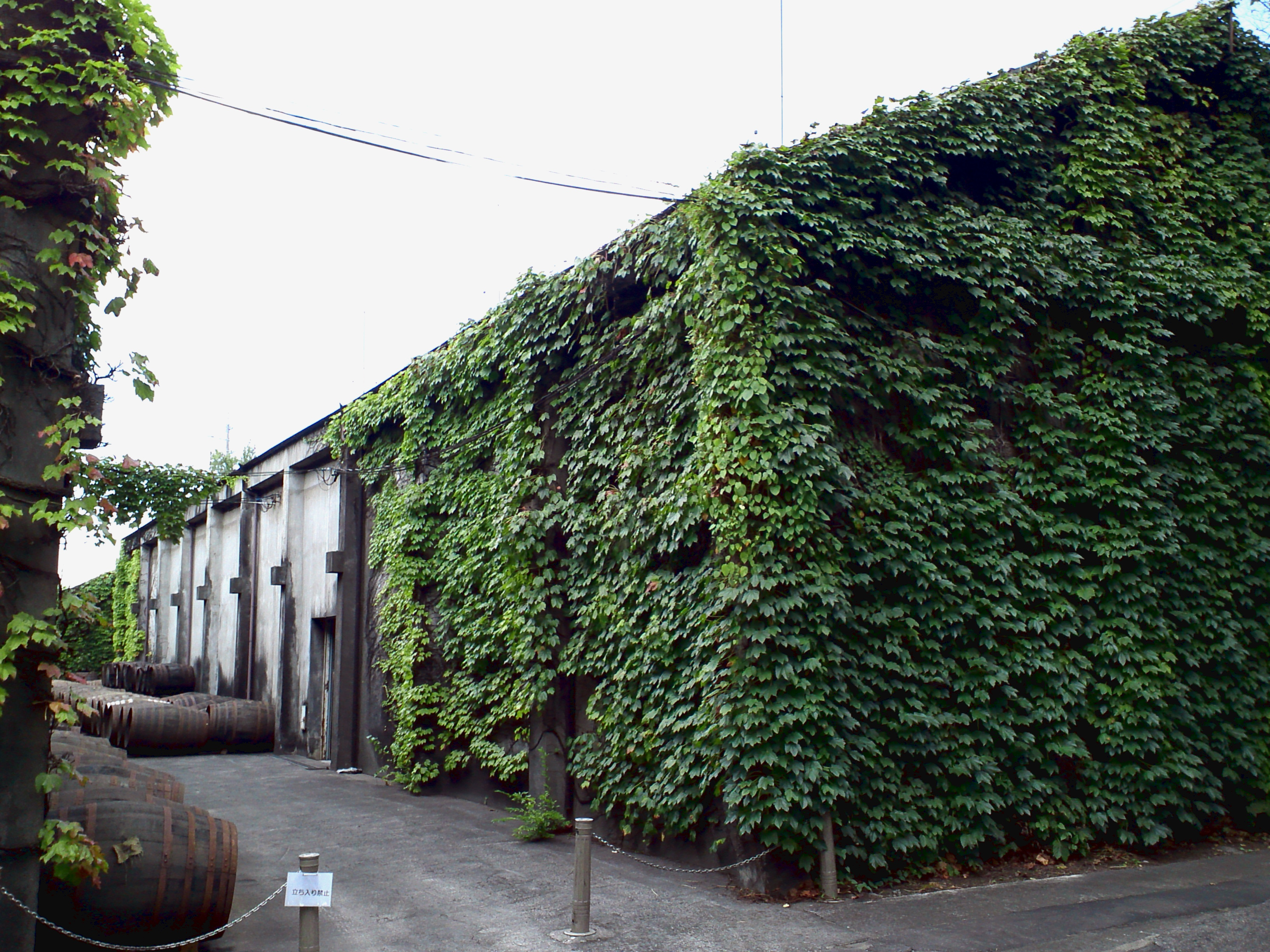
- The former distillery building, 2011

Region: Japan
- Location: Maseguchi 1795-2, Miyota-machi, Kita-Sakugun, Nagano Prefecture
- Coordinates: 36°19′22″N 138°30′24″E
- Owner: Mercian Corporation
- Founded: 1955
- Status: Closed
- No. of stills: 4 pot stills
- Mothballed: 2000

Karuizawa Distillery (軽井沢蒸溜所, Karuizawa jōryūsho) was a Japanese whisky distillery. It was located at Miyota, a town on the southern slopes of an active complex volcano, Mount Asama, in Kitasaku District, Nagano Prefecture, Japan.

The new Karuizawa Whisky, Karuizawa Whisky Co., Ltd. was set to go into operation in 2022 in Karuizawa, the birthplace of Japan’s first single malt whisky.

== Old "Karuizawa Whisky" ==
Founded in 1955, Karuizawa gained an enviable cache among whisky aficionados for its high-quality small-batch releases. It was owned by Mercian Corporation, and was the smallest in Japan. After the distillery was mothballed in 2000 and eventually closed in 2011, this reputation hit stratospheric proportions, and original Karuizawa liquid is now among the most rare and sought after in the whisky world. The remaining whisky stock from the distillery was purchased and re-branded, then released as a series of luxury whiskies. The rarest of these is the 1960 vintage, which is on sale at US$638,000 per bottle.

== New "Karuizawa Whisky" ==
The founder of Karuizawa Whisky Co., Ltd., Shigeru Totsuka discussed his plans to recreate the brand. The distillery officially opened in December 2022 with an opening ceremony, and whisky distilling began the same month. The site uses two pot stills made by Forsyths in Scotland that are the same as the original stills, but slightly larger. To replicate the Karuizawa liquid, the distillery has the same distillers, recipe and equipment, however, the hops are different. Japanese whisky bearing the Karuizawa name from the new site will go on sale in 10 years' time, from 2033.

Workers from the original Karuizawa distillery have been involved in the setting up the new facility, enabling some of the brand's founding principles to be carried through to the new liquids. The “most important puzzle piece” was hiring Karuizawa’s former master distillers, Osami Uchibori and Yoshiyuki Nakazato.
