= White Oak distillery =

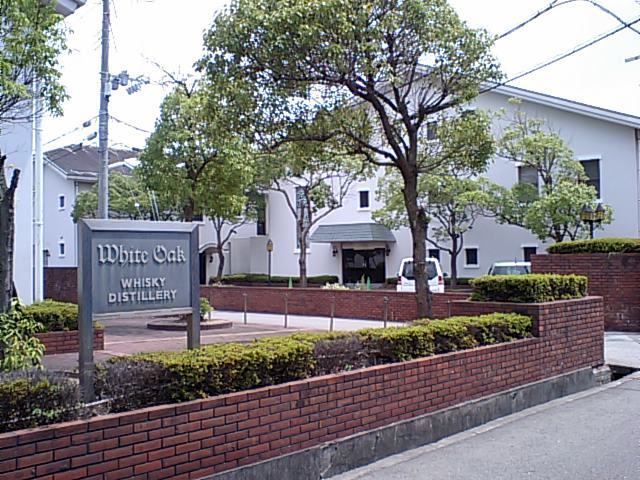

Region: Japan
- Location: 919 Okubo-cho 919, Akashi-shi, Hyōgo, 674-0065
- Coordinates: 34°40′53.2″N 134°54′21.6″E
- Owner: Eigashima Shuzo Co., Ltd.
- Founded: 1984
- Status: Active
- No. of stills: 2 pot stills
- Website: Eigashima Shuzo (in English)

White Oak distillery (Japanese: ホワイトオーク蒸溜所, Hepburn: Howaitoōku jōryūsho) is a Japanese whisky distillery. In operation since 1984, it is located in Akashi (明石市, Akashi-shi), a city in Hyōgo Prefecture, Japan. The distillery released its first single malt in late 2007, under the "Akashi" label.
