= Happōshu =

Japanese alcoholic beverage

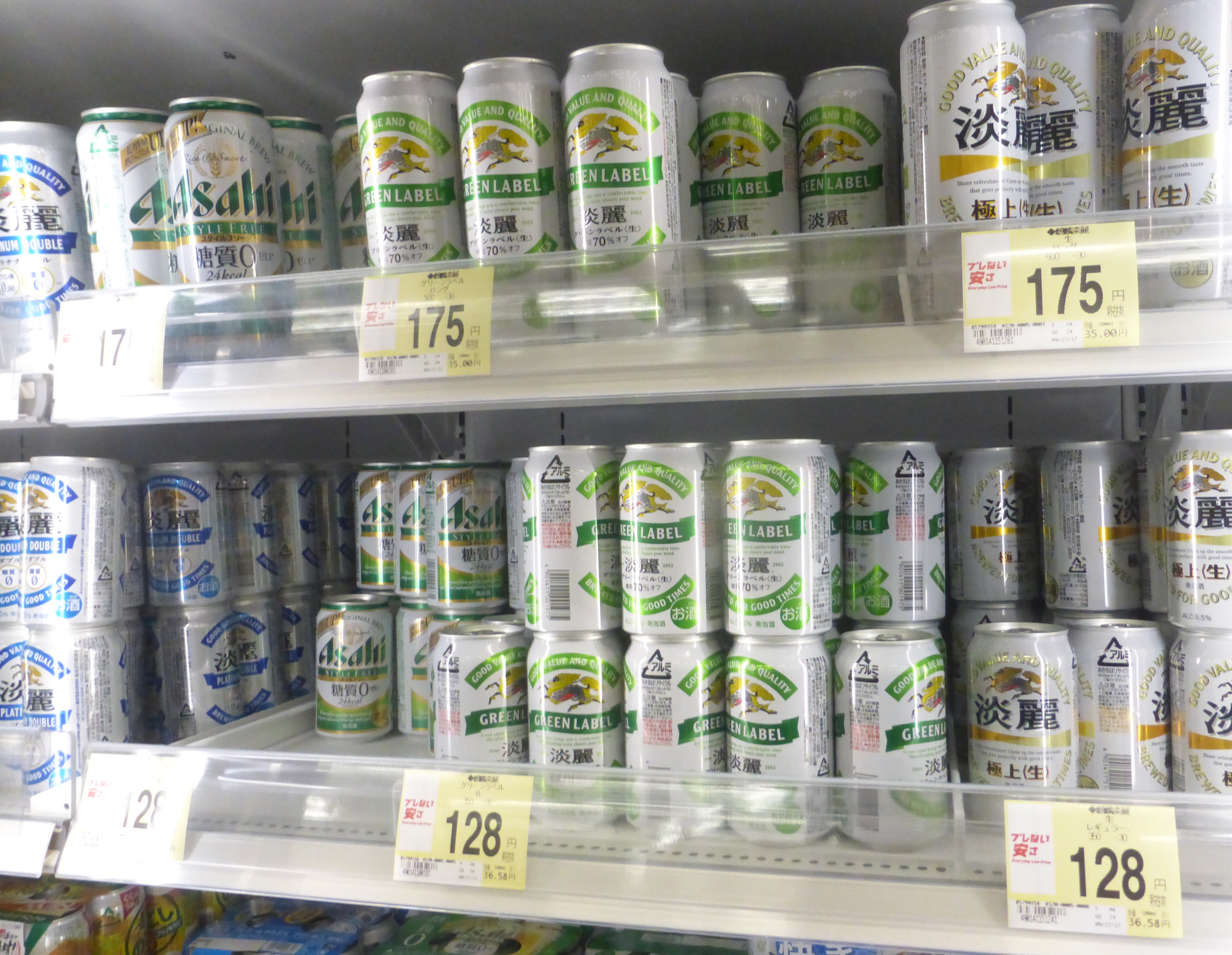
Various happoshu in a shop

Happoshu (Japanese: 発泡酒, Hepburn: happōshu; lit. 'sparkling alcoholic beverage'), or low-malt beer, is a tax category of Japanese liquor that most often refers to a beer-like beverage with less than 67% malt content. The alcoholic beverage is popular among consumers for having a lower tax than beverages that the nation's law classifies as "beer" (ビール, bīru). Although the happoshu label is most frequently found on low-malt beer or beer-like products, alcopops that contain malt are also categorized as happoshu.

== Overview ==
Japan's alcohol tax system divides beer-like malt beverages into four categories based on malt content: 67% or higher, 50 to 67%, 25 to 50%, and less than 25%. An alcoholic beverage based on malt is classified as beer if the weight of malt extract exceeds 67% of the fermentable ingredients. Since Suntory's introduction in 1994 of Hop's Draft, containing 65% malt, a market has emerged for low-malt, and recently, non-malt beer substitutes.

With alcohol tax revenues decreasing as a result of happoshu's popularity, the Japanese government eventually raised the nation's tax on low malt beers. In 1996, the tax for products containing 50 to 67% malt was raised to that of beer. Brewers followed suit by lowering the malt content of their products. Today, most happoshu contains less than 25% malt, putting it in the lowest tax category of low-malt beer. In recent years, Japanese brewers have released dozens of brands in an attempt to increase their market share. Many of these are marketed as more healthy products, with reduced carbohydrates and purines. Another trend is to use unmalted barley, such as in Sapporo's Mugi 100% Nama-shibori.

Beer-flavored beverages, collectively dubbed "third beer" (第三のビール, dai-san no bīru) by the media, were developed to compete with happoshu. These alcoholic products fell under categories which were not yet as highly taxed. The "third beer" beverages either use malt alternatives, or they are a mix of happoshu and another type of alcohol. When comparing 350 ml cans, the third beer brands were 10 to 25 yen cheaper than happoshu. However, since October 2023, the tax on "third beer" has been raised to the same as that of happoshu.

In July 2012, Suntory, which had been the first company to sell happoshu, announced that it would stop selling it by Autumn 2012.

Due to the nature of allowable ingredients in beverages that can legally be sold as "beer" in Japan (malted barley/wheat, hops, and adjuncts rice, corn, sorghum, potato, sugar/caramel, and starch), many imported Belgian beers and North American craft beers are also designated as happoshu, despite meeting the 67% malt requirement. This is somewhat similar to traditional German beer regulations' exclusion of foreign brews from the local definition of "beer" (see: Reinheitsgebot).

== Brands ==
- Happoshu from 25% to 50% malt content:
- Happoshu with less than 25% malt content:
  - Hokkaido Nama-shibori Migaki-mugi (Sapporo)
  - Hon-nama (Asahi), available in Red and Aqua Blue label (low-carb) versions
  - Diet-nama Clear Taste (Suntory)
  - Magnum Dry Golden Dry (Suntory)
  - Cool Draft (Asahi)
  - Tanrei-nama (Kirin), also available in Green Label (low-carb), and Tanrei W (reduced purines)
  - Enjuku (Kirin)
  - Style Free (Asahi)
  - Dosan Sozai (Sapporo)
  - Zero (Kirin)
- Alcohol classified as "Other miscellaneous (2)", containing no malt:
  - Draft One (Sapporo) - uses pea protein
  - Nodogoshi-nama (Kirin) - uses soy protein
  - Slims (Sapporo) - uses pea protein
  - Jokki-Nama (Suntory) - uses corn, also available in regular and strong versions
- Alcohol classified as "Liqueur":
  - Super Blue (Suntory) - happoshu mixed with wheat spirits
  - Strong Seven (Kirin) - happoshu mixed with barley spirits
  - Hop No Shinjitsu (Kirin) - happoshu mixed with barley spirits
  - Koku No Jikan (Kirin) - happoshu mixed with barley spirits
  - Goku-uma (Asahi) - happoshu mixed with barley spirits
  - Ajiwai (Asahi) - happoshu mixed with barley spirits
  - Clear Asahi (Asahi) - happoshu mixed with barley spirits
  - Asahi Off (Asahi) - happoshu mixed with barley spirits
  - Mugi Shibori (Asahi) - happoshu mixed with barley spirits
  - Mugi To Hop (Sapporo) - happoshu mixed with barley spirits
  - Off No Zeitaku (Sapporo) - happoshu mixed with barley spirits
  - Kinmugi [Rich Malt] (Suntory) - happoshu mixed with wheat spirits
  - The Straight (Suntory) - happoshu mixed with wheat spirits

* "Dry beer" refers to beers with less residual sugars and a dry taste. "Nama beer" generally refers to unpasteurized draught beer usually served from a pressurized keg. However, in the above brands, it is merely a marketing term; compare to Miller Genuine Draft.

== See also ==
- Beer in Japan
