= FANCL Corporation =

Japanese company

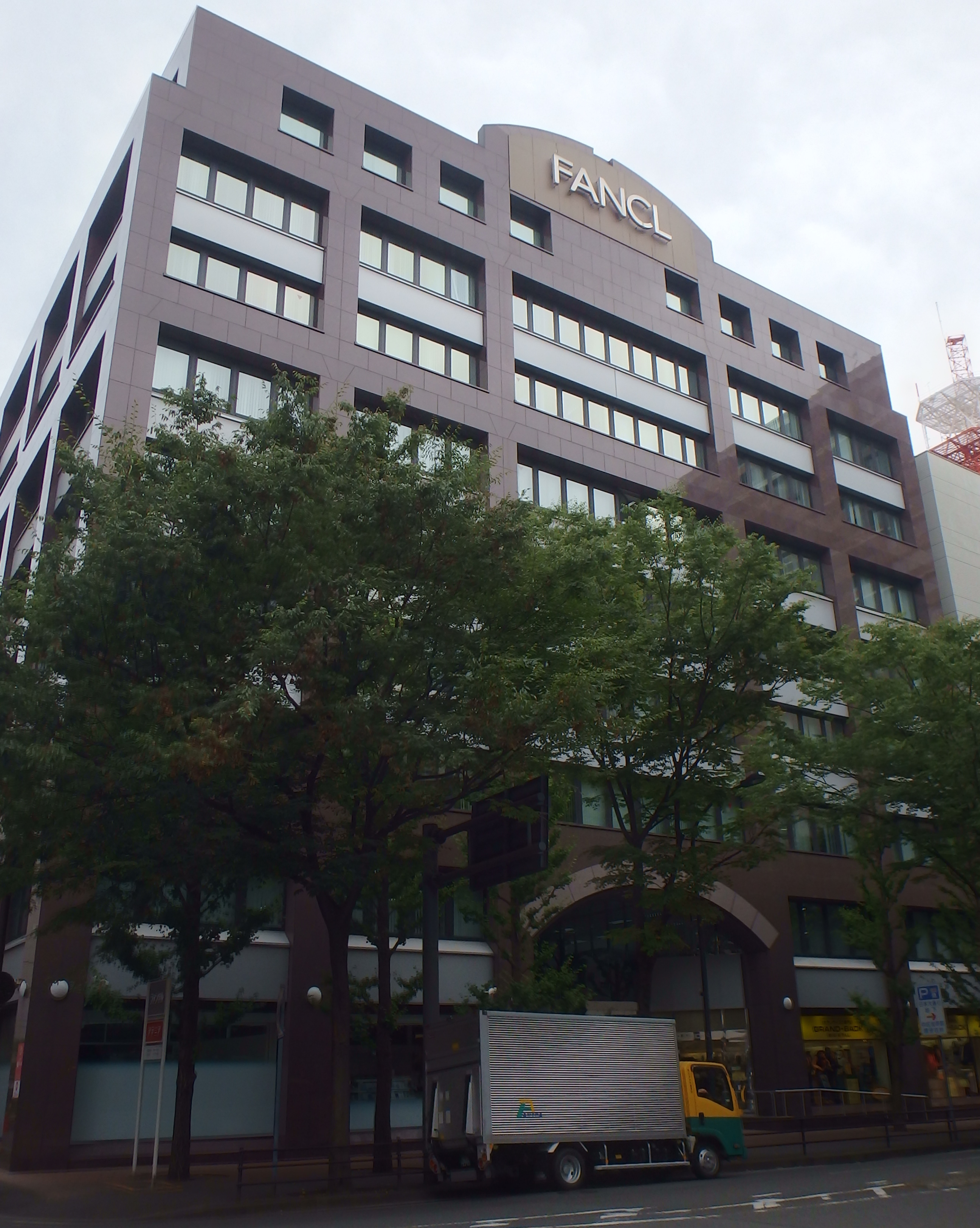
- Corporate headquarters in Naka-ku, Yokohama, Japan
- Native name: 株式会社ファンケル
- Romanized name: Kabushiki gaisha Fankeru
- Company type: Public
- Traded as: TYO: 4921
- Industry: Cosmetics; Dietary supplements
- Founded: August 18, 1981
- Headquarters: Yokohama, Japan
- Key people: Kenji Ikemori (Founder, Chairman); Kazuyoshi Miyajima (Vice-Chairman); Kazuyuki Shimada (President, CEO)
- Revenue: ▲JP¥122 billion (2019)
- Net income: ▲JP¥8.6 billion (2019)
- Website: www.fancl.jp

FANCL Corporation is a Japanese cosmetics and dietary supplements company incorporated on August 18, 1981.

== History ==
FANCL was listed on the First Section of the Tokyo Stock Exchange in 1999.

On August 6, 2019, Kirin Holdings announced it would take a 33% stake in FANCL Corporation for US$1.21 billion.
