= Shinshu Mars distillery =

Japanese whisky distillery

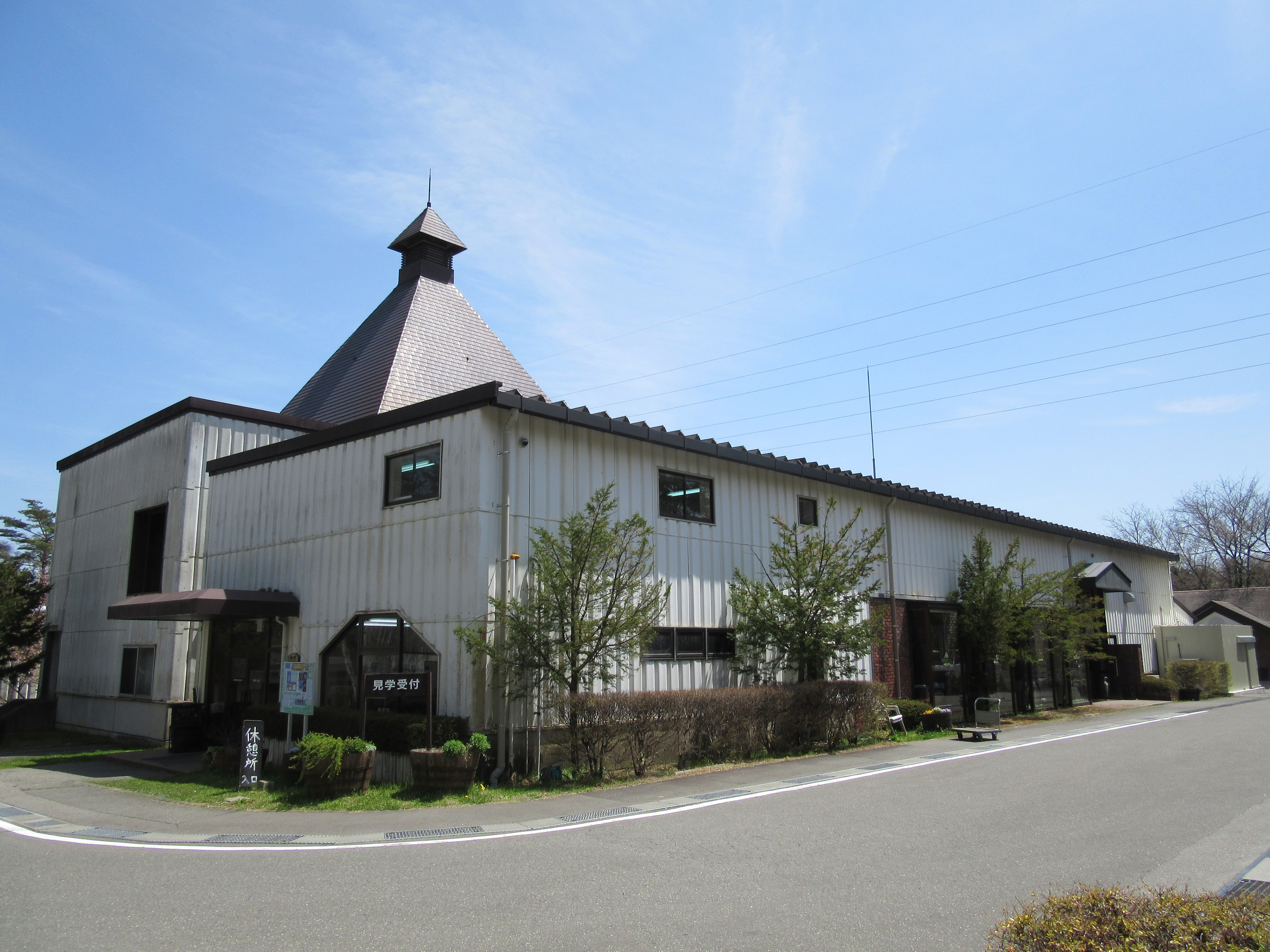
- Location: Miyatamura 4752-31, Kamiina, Nagano, 399-4301
- Coordinates: 35°44′51.4″N 137°54′04.1″E
- Owner: Hombo Shuzo Co., Ltd.
- Founded: 1985
- Status: Active
- No. of stills: 2 pot stills
- Mothballed: 1992–2011
- Website: Website (in Japanese)

Shinshu Mars distillery (Japanese: 信州マルス蒸留所, Hepburn: Shinshu Mars jōryūsho) is a Japanese whisky distillery. Founded in 1985, and mothballed from 1992 to 2011, it is owned by Hombo Shuzo Co., Ltd., a Japanese "shōchū" maker based in Kagoshima Prefecture on the island of Kyushu, Japan.

The distillery is located at Miyada (宮田村, Miyada-mura), a village in Nagano Prefecture, Japan. At around 800 m (2,600 ft) above sea level, it is Japan's highest whisky distillery.
