= Coca-Cola Beverages Northeast =

Soft drink bottler

- Company type: Subsidiary
- Industry: Beverage
- Founded: 1977; 49 years ago in Laconia, New Hampshire, United States
- Headquarters: Bedford, New Hampshire, United States
- Area served: United States
- Key people: Mark Francoeur (President)
- Parent: Kirin Company
- Website: www.cokenortheast.com

The Coca-Cola Beverages Northeast, formerly known as Coca-Cola Bottling Company of Northern New England, is a bottler of Coca-Cola, Dr Pepper, and Canada Dry soft drinks in the New England region as well as almost the entirety of Upstate New York. The company is a fully independent franchisee bottler, as The Coca-Cola Company holds no ownership in the company, which is 100% owned by Japan-based Kirin Brewery, who until 2018 also owned the rights to the Moxie soft drink nationwide.

== History ==
The Coca-Cola Bottling Company of Northern New England (CCNNE) was founded in Laconia, New Hampshire in 1977. Today it operates 16 distribution centers in all six New England states, as well as upstate New York. It has been a subsidiary of Kirin since 1988. In October 2019 CCNNE was renamed Coca-Cola Beverages Northeast.

== Products ==
Coca-Cola Beverages Northeast bottles and/or distributes products from The Coca-Cola Company, Dr Pepper Snapple Group, Nestlé, and Campbell's.

Sparkling soft drinks

- Coca-Cola
- Coca-Cola Zero
- Diet Coke
- Sprite (soft drink)
- Barq's Root Beer
- Fanta
- Fresca
- Dr Pepper
- Sunkist Orange
- Canada Dry ginger ale and mixers

Still beverages

- Powerade
- Bottled waters Dasani, Evian, SmartWater
- Minute Maid
- Gold Peak Tea, Nestea

Emerging brands

- Full Throttle (drink)
- Glacéau
- Orangina
- NOS (drink) energy drink
