= Akkeshi distillery =

Region: Japan
- Location: 4-109-2 Miyazono, Akkeshi-cho, Akkeshi-gun, Hokkaido 088-1124
- Coordinates: 43°4′33.0″N 144°49′14.7″E
- Owner: Kenten Jitsugyo
- Founded: 2016
- Status: Active
- No. of stills: 1 wash still, 1 spirit still
- Website: Akkeshi distillery (in English)

Akkeshi distillery (Japanese: 厚岸蒸溜所, Hepburn: Akkeshi jōryūsho) is a Japanese whisky distillery. Founded in 2016, the distillery is owned by Kenten Jitsugyo, a trading company based in Tokyo. It is located at Akkeshi (厚岸町, Akkeshi-cho), a town in Kushiro Subprefecture, Hokkaido.
