= Hakushu distillery =

Japanese whisky distillery

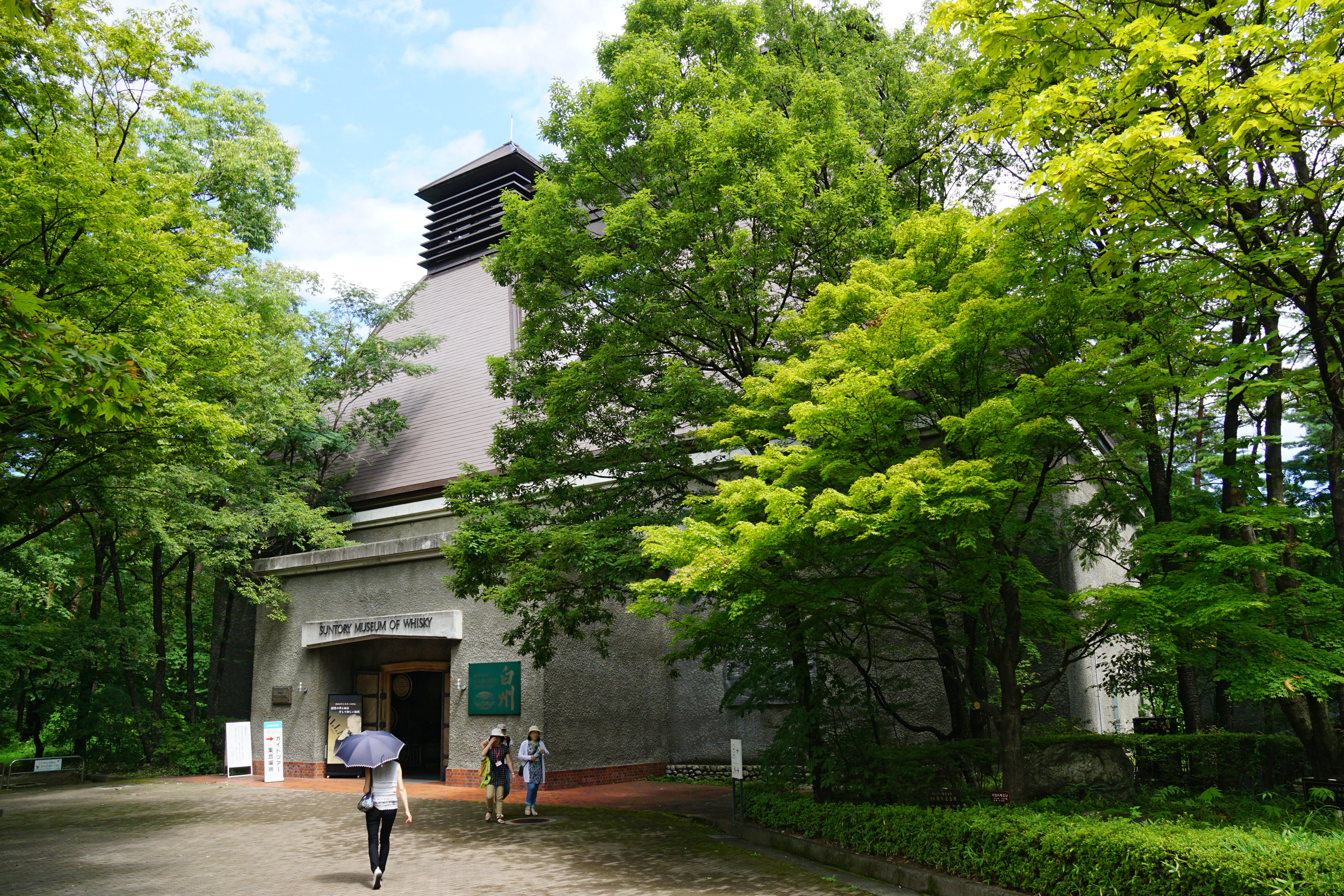
- Location: Torihara 2913-1, Hakushu-machi, Hokuto city, Yamanashi Prefecture, 408-0316; Japan
- Coordinates: 35°49′36″N 138°18′06″E
- Owner: Suntory
- Founded: 1973
- Status: Active
- No. of stills: 6 wash stills; 6 spirit stills
- Website: Suntory Hakushu Distillery

Hakushu distillery (Japanese: 白州蒸溜所, Hepburn: Hakushū jōryūsho) is a Japanese whisky distillery. It is owned by the Suntory group, and situated in the Toribara locality (鳥原; also pronounced Torihara) of the former town of Hakushū (now part of Hokuto), in the Yamanashi Prefecture, Chūbu region, Japan.

The distillery was established in 1973, in the forest on the slopes of Mount Kaikoma (甲斐駒ヶ岳, Kaikoma-ga-take). In 1981, it was expanded by the commissioning of a second Hakushu East site, near the original site, now called Hakushu West. All production is now focused on the new site.

== Bottlings ==
Hakushu is produced in the following bottlings:

Main range:

- Hakushu Single Malt "Distiller's Reserve" (New 2014 addition to the core range), 43%;
- Hakushu Single Malt 12 years 43%;
- Hakushu Single Malt 18 years 43%;
- Hakushu Single Malt 25 years 43%.

Limited series:

- 2013: Heavily Peated 48%;
- 2014: Sherry Cask 48%.
