= Chita distillery =

Japanese whisky distillery

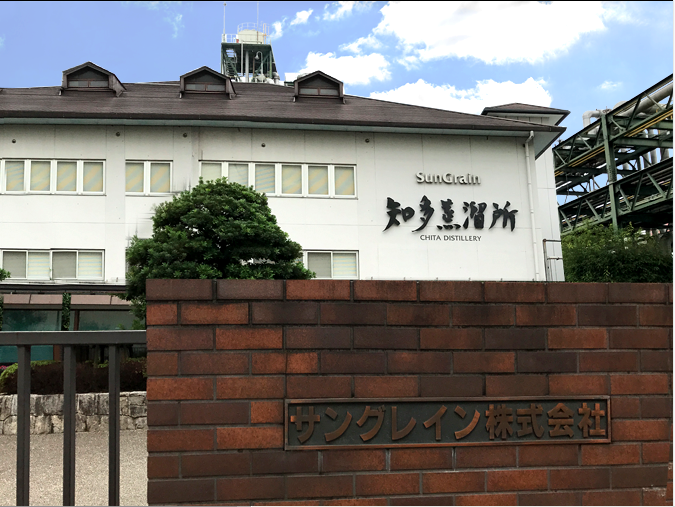
- Main office of the Chita distillery
- Location: Kitahamamachi 16, Chita-shi, Aichi-ken 〒478-0046; Japan
- Coordinates: 35°0′16.641″N 136°51′6.564″E
- Owner: Suntory
- Founded: 1972
- Status: Active
- Website: Suntory Chita Distillery
- Characteristics: Light taste; Citrus notes; Medium finish

Chita distillery (Japanese: 知多蒸溜所, Hepburn: Chita jōryūsho) is a Japanese whisky distillery located at the Port of Nagoya Sun Grain facility in the Chita District of the Aichi Prefecture, Japan. Opened in 1972, it is owned by Suntory.
