= Asaka distillery =

Japanese whiskey distillery

- Location: 1-178 Sasagawa, Kōriyama, Fukushima 963-0108
- Coordinates: 37°21′42.8″N 140°22′20.7″E
- Owner: Sasanokawa Shuzo
- Founded: 2016
- Founder: Tetsuzo Yamaguchi
- Status: Active
- No. of stills: 1 wash still, 1 spirit still
- Website: Asaka distillery on Facebook (in Japanese)

Asaka distillery (Japanese: 安積蒸溜所, Hepburn: Asaka jōryūsho) is a Japanese whisky distillery. Founded in 2016, it is owned by Sasanokawa Shuzo Co., Ltd., a Japanese sake and shōchū maker based in Fukushima Prefecture in the Tōhoku region of Honshu, Japan. The distillery is located at Kōriyama (郡山市, Kōriyama-shi), a city in Fukushima Prefecture.
