= Mercian Corporation =

- Native name: メルシャン株式会社
- Company type: Public
- Founded: 1934
- Headquarters: Nakano, Tokyo, Japan
- Key people: Kiyoshi Yokoyama (CEO, President)
- Number of employees: 501 (2014)
- Parent: Kirin Company, Limited
- Website: www.mercian.co.jp

Mercian Corporation (メルシャン株式会社, Merushan kabushiki gaisha) is a Tokyo-based operating unit of Kirin, primarily engaged in the production and retail of wine and other alcoholic beverages.

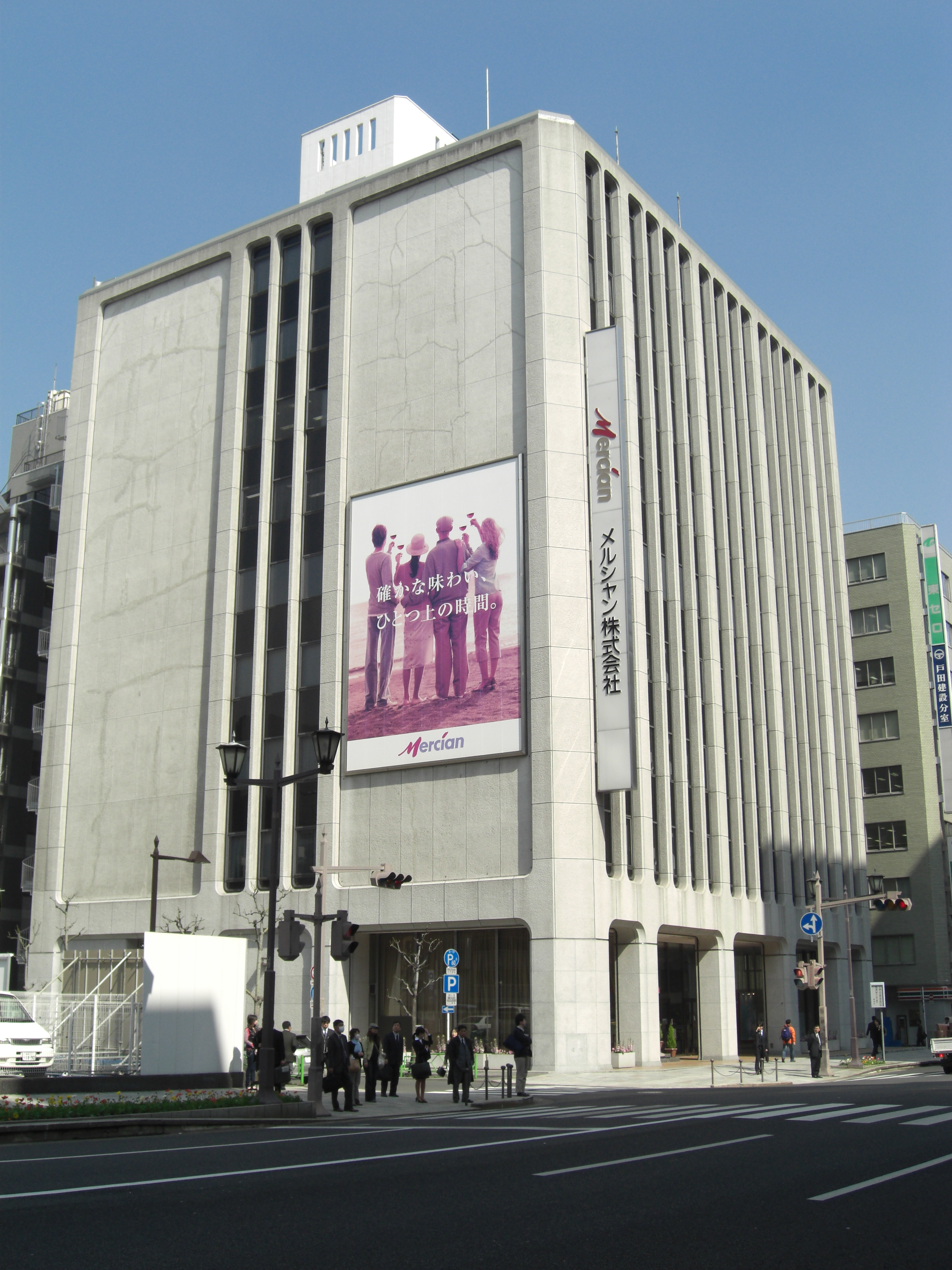
Mercian Corporation head office

Chateau Mercian, produced and sold in Japan, is one of the most widely available brands of Japanese wine. Mercian Corporation also markets imported wine such as the Casillero del Diablo, Frontera, and Sunrise brands in partnership with Concha y Toro, a leading Chilean wine producer.

Mercian has domestic wine production facilities in Kanagawa, Yamanashi and Kumamoto prefectures.
