= Beer in Japan =

Overview of beer production and consumption in Japan

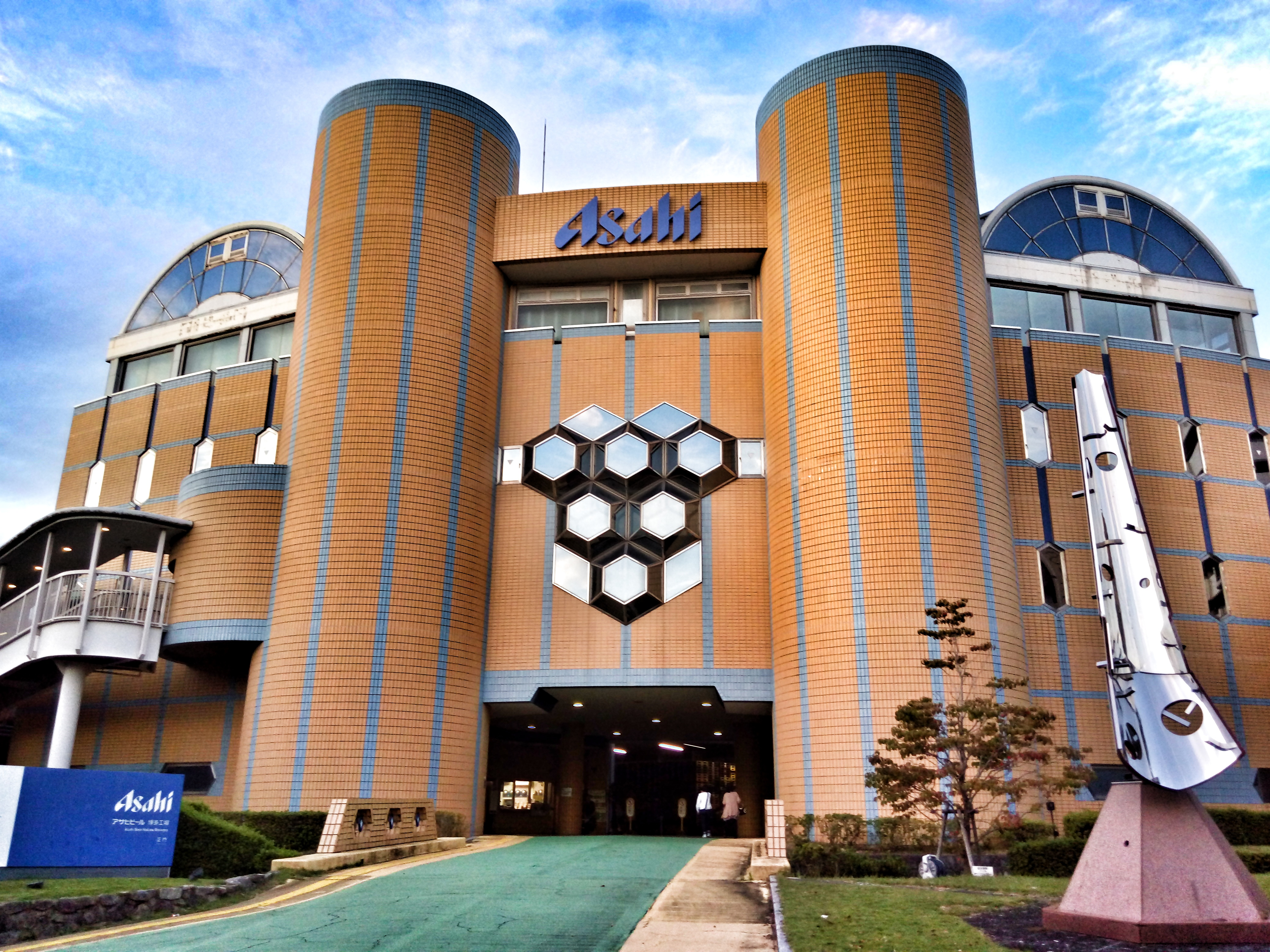
The Hakata brewery of Asahi, one of Japan's major brewing companies

Beer in Japan mostly comes from the country's four major breweries—Asahi, Kirin, Sapporo and Suntory—which mainly produce pale lagers around 5% ABV. Beer is widely consumed in Japan, and is often described in reference works as more popular than sake.

In addition to standard beer, beer-like beverages made with lower levels of malt—legally and commercially distinguished in Japan—include happōshu (発泡酒) and other low- or non-malt “beer-taste” products, which have held a substantial share of the market in part because applicable liquor taxes vary by ingredients and malt content.

Microbreweries and “craft beer” have also grown since deregulation in 1994, supplying a wider range of styles than the mass-market lagers that dominated the postwar period. Craft beer bars and pubs are popular in major cities such as Tokyo and Osaka, and commonly feature locally produced beer alongside imports.

== History ==
Although the tradition of sake brewing long predates European contact, beer is generally understood to have entered Japan through early modern contact with Europeans and became more visible with the expansion of foreign settlement and trade in the mid-19th century. Under Tokugawa-era restrictions, the Dutch were the only Europeans permitted to reside and trade from Dejima in Nagasaki, and knowledge of European food and drink circulated gradually through rangaku (Dutch learning).

Beer was not widely available until the end of the 19th century, but imports and diplomatic or treaty-port encounters increased after Japan’s treaties with Western powers in the 1850s. Contemporary commentary suggests that early tastings could be skeptical; one account describes beer presented during Commodore Matthew C. Perry’s expedition as unpleasantly bitter.

=== Early commercial breweries and Meiji industrialization (1868–1900) ===
Before domestic commercial brewing scaled up, beer in Japan was encountered mainly through imports in treaty ports and foreign settlements; British export ales were among the types available to expatriate communities and elites in the mid-19th century.

Commercial brewing began in the late 1860s–1870s, closely tied to treaty-port settlements and the Meiji state’s industrial modernization. In Yokohama, William Copeland established a major early brewery in the foreign settlement in 1869–1870 (often associated in later histories with the “Spring Valley” name).

In Hokkaido, the Meiji government’s Kaitakushi (Development Commission) established the Kaitakushi Beer Brewery in Sapporo in 1876, appointing Seibei Nakagawa—trained in Germany—as an important technical figure in early operations; this brewery is commonly treated as an origin point for what became Sapporo Beer.

In Osaka, Osaka Brewery (a predecessor to Asahi Breweries) was founded in 1889 and began marketing the Asahi Beer brand in 1892, reflecting the rapid spread of large-scale brewing enterprises in the late Meiji period.

=== Industry consolidation and early regulation (1900–1945) ===
The early twentieth century saw the emergence of dominant firms, as well as regulatory changes that shaped brewing scale. The Brewers Association of Japan notes a Beer Tax Law enacted in 1901 and major consolidation in 1906, developments that made small-scale operation more difficult and encouraged concentration in the industry. Scholarship on the period similarly emphasizes the combined effects of foreign technical expertise, corporate sponsorship, and state taxation on the survival and growth of leading breweries.

=== Postwar market and the craft beer era (1945–present) ===
After World War II, Japan’s beer market expanded rapidly alongside postwar economic growth. A major structural change for small producers came in 1994, when minimum production requirements for a beer manufacturing license were reduced, contributing to the emergence of many regional “ji-bīru” (craft) breweries.

== Market size ==
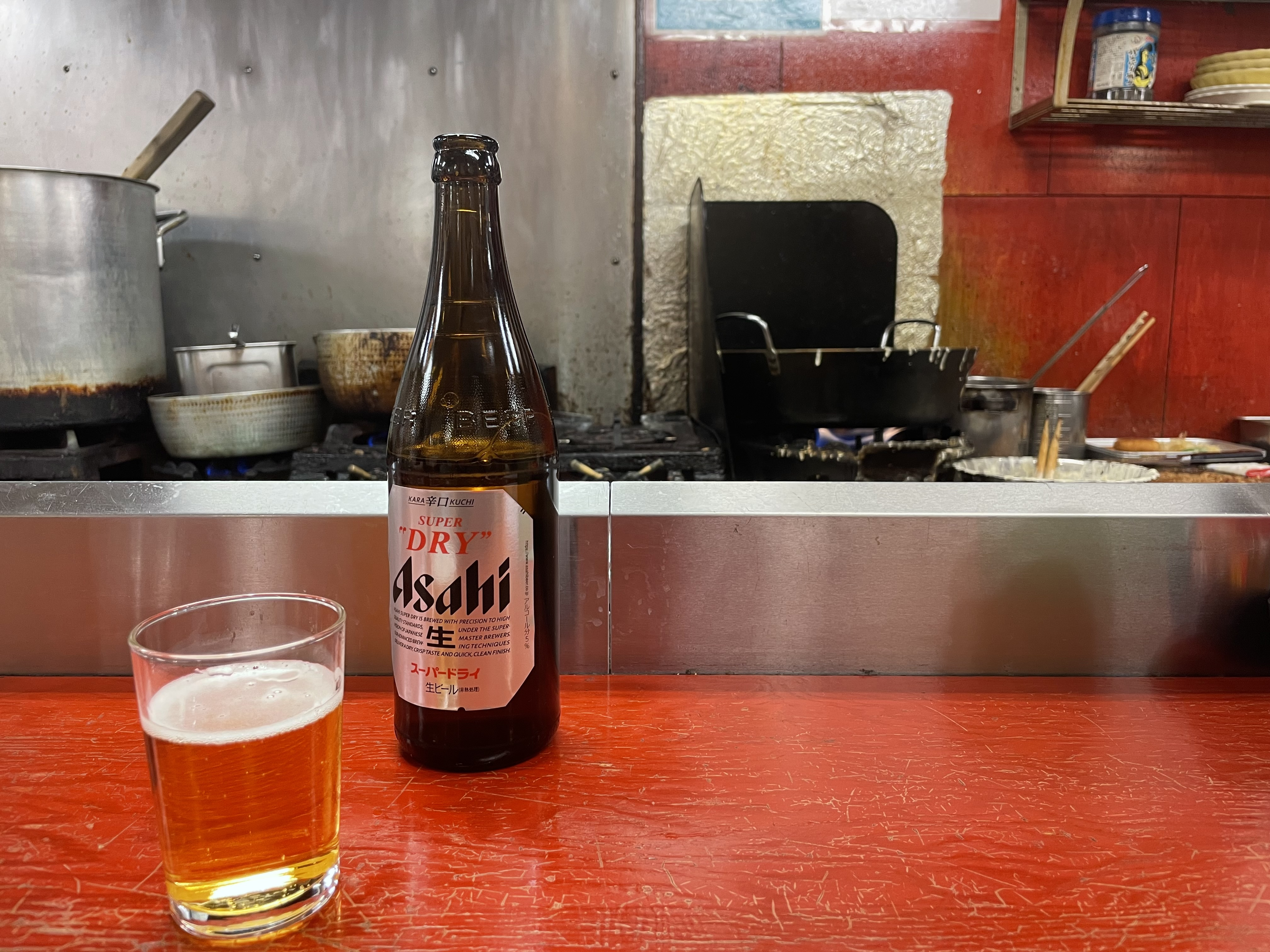
Asahi at a restaurant in Osaka

Beer (and beer-like happoshu) have been among the most popular alcoholic drinks in Japan. In 2006, beer and beer-like products accounted for nearly two thirds of approximately 9 billion liters of alcohol consumed in Japan.

Japan's domestic consumption of the total 187.37 million kiloliter global beer market in 2012 was about 5.55 million kiloliters (about 3.0%); this statistic also includes beer-like happoshu.

== Beer vs. happoshu ==
Brewed alcoholic beverages in Japan are labelled and taxed according to their malt content (i.e., the amount of alcohol derived from malted grains): legally, beer must have at least 50% malt, while beverages with less malt are collectively called happoshu (and other “new genre”/beer-taste products exist under additional ingredient and labeling rules).

== Microbreweries ==
In 1994, Japan's liquor tax rules were revised to allow smaller breweries to qualify for licenses at much lower minimum annual production levels than previously required, which contributed to a wave of microbrewery openings and the later consolidation of a craft beer sector.

There are hundreds of microbreweries in Japan, producing a range of styles including ales, IPAs, stouts, pilsners, wheat beers and others; after an initial boom following the 1994 changes, consumer enthusiasm and product quality varied, and the sector later stabilized as producers improved consistency and distribution.

== Major beer producers ==
Japan’s major brewers include:

- Asahi Breweries
- Kirin Company
- Sapporo Brewery
- Suntory
- Orion Breweries

=== Dry Wars ===
The dorai sensō (ドライ戦争) was a period of intense competition among Japanese breweries following the 1987 launch of Asahi Super Dry, which helped popularize “dry” beer as a mass-market category and prompted competitors to introduce rival products.

== Japanese beers available outside Japan ==
Japanese-brand beers are also distributed internationally, and some products are brewed outside Japan under license in certain markets. Availability varies by country, import arrangements and local alcohol regulations.

== Homebrewing ==
Home production of alcoholic beverages above a low ABV threshold is restricted under Japanese liquor law without a license; nonetheless, homebrewing ingredients and equipment are widely available and discussed within hobbyist communities.

== See also ==
- Beer and breweries by region
- Happoshu
