= Kirin Company =

Japanese beverage company

Kirin Holdings Company, Limited

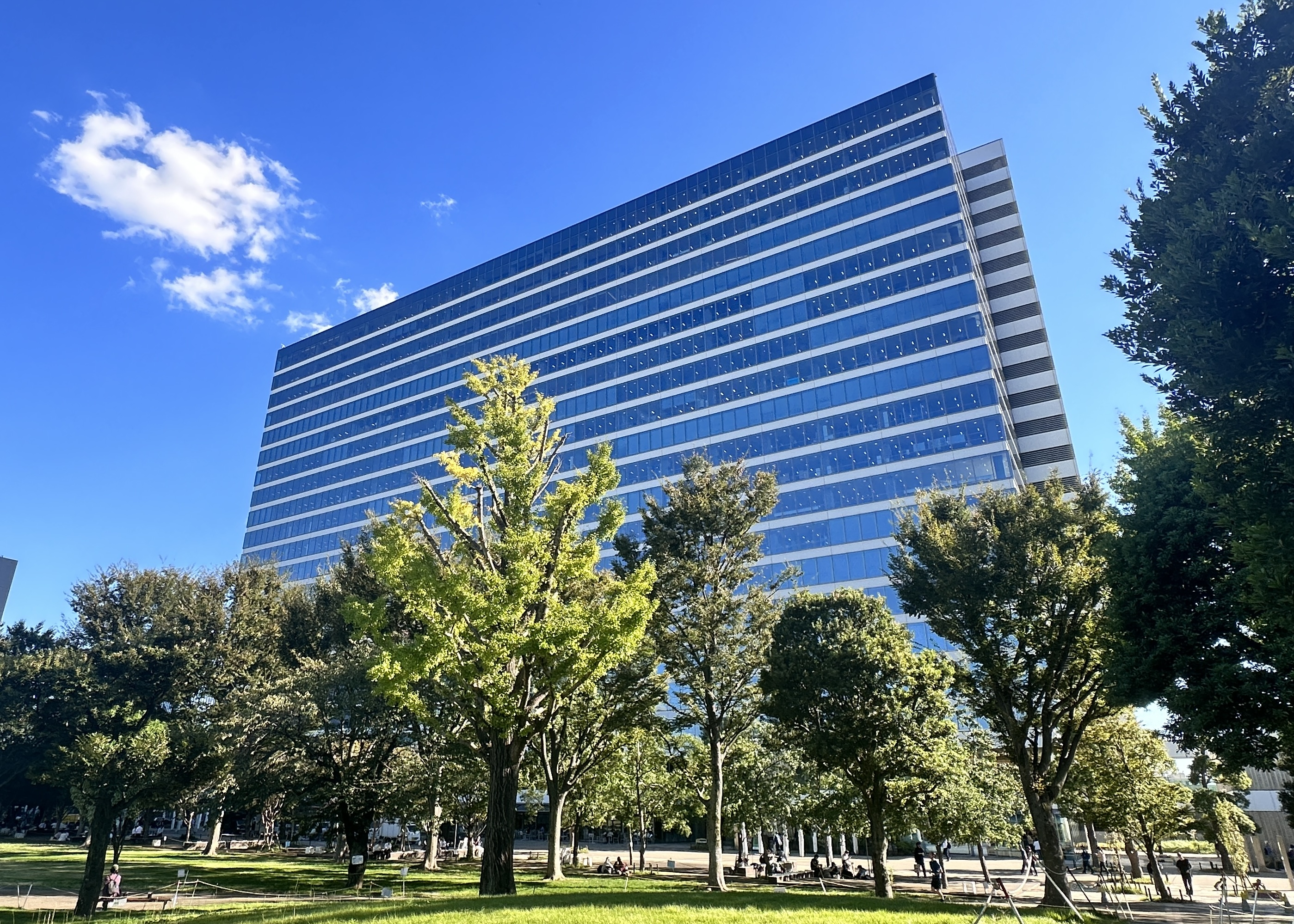
- Headquarters in Nakano, Tokyo
- Native name: キリンホールディングス株式会社
- Romanized name: Kirin Hōrudingusu kabushiki gaisha
- Formerly: Kirin Brewery Company, Limited (1907-2007)
- Type: Public
- Traded as: TYO: 2503; NAG: 2503; FSE: 2503; SSE: 2503; TOPIX Large70 component (TYO); Nikkei 225 component (TYO)
- Industry: Beverage
- Predecessor: Spring Valley Brewery Company
- Founded: 1885; 141 years ago (as Japan Brewery Company); 23 February 1907; 119 years ago (as Kirin Brewery Company)
- Founder: William Copeland; Thomas Blake Glover
- Headquarters: Nakano-ku, Tokyo, Japan
- Key people: Hideki Horiguchi (president and CEO)
- Services: Strategic management and oversight of the domestic beverage business.
- Number of employees: 30,464 (consolidated)
- Subsidiaries: Kirin Brewery Company; Kirin Beverage Company; Mercian Corporation; Kyowa Kirin (50.10%)
- Website: www.kirinholdings.com

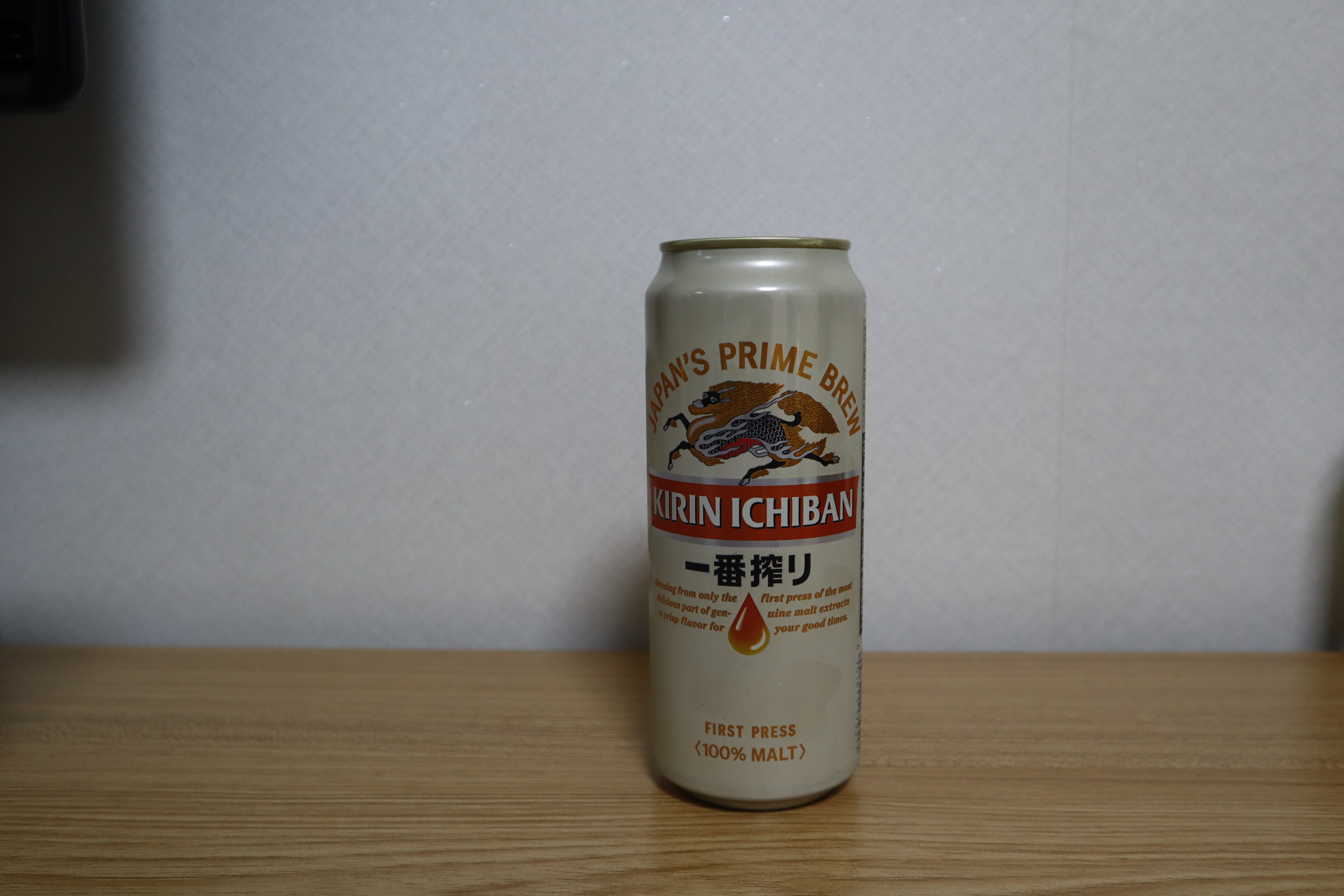
A can of Kirin Ichiban

Kirin Holdings Company, Limited. (キリンホールディングス株式会社) is a Japanese beer and beverage holding company. It is known for brands such as Kirin Beer, Kirin Lemon, Mets, and Gogo no Kōcha.

The predecessor of the company, the Japan Brewery Company, was founded in Yokohama in 1885 by William Henry Talbot and Edgar Abbott. In 1888, they launched Kirin Beer. By 1907, the Japan Brewery Company was run almost entirely by Japanese, and was incorporated under the name Kirin Brewery Company. In 2007, it became Kirin Holdings Company, a holding company, with Kirin Beer Company, Kirin Beverage Company, and Mercian Corporation as its main subsidiaries. As a result, the brewery division was taken over by the second incarnation of Kirin Brewery.

Kirin is a core member of the Mitsubishi Group.

== Etymology of name ==
In Japanese, "Kirin" can refer to giraffes, or to Qilin (麒麟), the mythical hooved Chinese chimerical creatures in East Asian culture. Kirin Brewery is named after the latter.

== History ==
The Japan Brewery Company, Limited, the forerunner of Kirin Brewery, was established in 1885, taking over the assets of the Spring Valley Brewery, first founded in Yokohama in 1869 by Norwegian-American brewer, William Copeland. In a deal brokered by Thomas Blake Glover, Japan Brewery was incorporated in Hong Kong in the name of W. H. Talbot and E. H. Abbott with financial backing provided by a group of Japanese investors including Iwasaki Yanosuke, then-president of Mitsubishi.

Japan Brewery first began marketing Kirin Beer in 1888. The Kirin Brewery Company was established as a separate legal entity in February 1907, purchasing the assets of the Japan Brewery and expanding the business in an era of growing consumer demand. Kirin Brewery built on the traditions of Japan Brewery retaining the use of malted grains and hops imported from Germany and employing German brewers to oversee production. An exclusive partnership with Meidi-ya proved highly successful in the marketing of Kirin's beers both in Japan and under the Japan Brewery and Water Bureau and Ministry of Agriculture, Forestry and Fisheries.

== Corporate overview ==
Kirin Brewery sells two of the most popular beers in Japan: Kirin Lager, one of the country's oldest beer brands, brewed since 1888; and Ichiban Shibori. Within the happoshu (low-malt) category, Kirin Tanrei is the top seller. Kirin handles domestic distribution for several foreign brands, including Budweiser and Heineken.

Kirin's brewery operations also extend overseas, through strategic alliances, subsidiaries, and affiliates, to China, Taiwan, Australia, the Philippines, Europe, New Zealand and the United States. The company holds a 100% stake in Lion Nathan Limited, a consolidated subsidiary that is based in Australia but has particularly important operations in China. Kirin has a 48% stake in San Miguel Brewery, the dominant brewer in the Philippines. Kirin now applies its fermentation technology to areas such as plant genetics, pharmaceuticals, and bioengineering. Although brewing and related businesses remain the core of Kirin's activities, the company is also involved in several other sectors: hard liquor, wine, soft drinks, and food products.

In December 2006, the Kirin Brewery Company of Japan purchased a 25% stake in Hangzhou Qiandaohu Beer Co., Ltd. for US$38 million.

On 14 July 2009, Kirin announced that it was in negotiations with Suntory on a merger. On 8 February 2010, it was announced that negotiations between the two had been terminated.

In early 2010 Kirin's Agribio business was sold to Dutch H2 Equity Partners; now it's part of Dümmen Orange.

In 2010, 23.4 percent of Kirin's sales were made overseas, the highest overseas revenue among all Japanese breweries.

In October 2011, the court decided that Kirin could buy a majority stake in family-run Brazilian beer Schincariol. Kirin bought a 50.45 percent stake in 2011, valued at $2.6 billion. In November 2011, Kirin Holdings Company agreed to buy out the remaining shareholders in Brazilian beermaker Schincariol Participacoes e Representacoes, completing its biggest acquisition as it sees growth in emerging markets ($1.35 billion was paid for the 49.54 percent stake, giving it control of all outstanding shares). In November 2012, Kirin changed Schincariol's name to Brasil Kirin.

In 2013 Kirin joined leading alcohol producers as part of a producers' commitments to reducing harmful drinking.

In February 2013, Charoen Sirivadhanabhakdi bought the 15% stake of Singapore's Fraser & Neave (F&N), a property-to-drinks conglomerate, from Kirin for US$1.6 billion.

In July 2014, Kirin announced its intention to revive the Spring Valley Brewery brand as a wholly owned subsidiary company to focus on producing and retailing microbrewery style beers produced using traditional ingredients and brewing methods.

On 20 January 2017, Heineken NV and Kirin Holdings confirmed they were in negotiations for Heineken to acquire Brasil Kirin.

On 5 February 2018, Kirin Holdings announced the acquisition of 95% outstanding shares in Kyowa Hakko Bio Co. Ltd, from Kyowa Hakko Kirin to expand to wellness and bio-chemical products.

On 6 August 2019, Kirin Holdings announced it would take a 33% stake in cosmetics and dietary supplements company Fancl Corp for US$1.21 billion.

On 30 June 2022, Kirin Holdings announced to sell its 51% stake in Myanmar Brewery Limited, its Myanmar joint venture to its military-linked local partner.

== Holdings in Japan ==
=== Alcoholic beverage business ===
- Kirin Brewery Company Limited
- Mercian
- Kirin Distillery Company, Limited (Renamed from Kirin-Seagram Ltd. on 1 July 2002)
- Ei Sho Gen Company, Limited
- Kirin Communications Stage Company, Limited

=== Soft drink business ===
- Kirin Beverage Company, Limited
- Kinki Coca-Cola Bottling Company, Limited
  - Coca-Cola Beverages Northeast

=== Logistics ===
- Kirin Group Logistics Company, Limited

=== Engineering ===
- Kirin Techno-System Company, Limited
- Kirin Engineering Company, Limited

=== Restaurants ===
- Kirin Dining Company, Limited
- Kirin City Company, Limited

=== Real estate ===
- Kirin Building Management Company., Limited
- Kirin Hotel Development Company, Limited

=== Other core businesses ===
- Kirin Echo Company, Limited

=== Nutrient food ===
- Kirin Well-Foods Company, Limited
- Takeda-Kirin Foods Corporation
- Cosmo Foods Company, Limited

=== Agribio ===
- Kirin Green & Flower Company, Limited
- Flower Gate, Inc.
- Flower Season Company, Limited
- Verdy Company, Limited
- Tokita Seed Company, Limited
- Japan Potato Corporation

=== Food ===
- Nagano Tomato Company, Limited

=== Healthcare ===
- FANCL Corporation
- Kyowa Kirin Company, Limited
- Kyowa Hakko Bio

== Holdings outside Japan ==
=== Alcohol business ===
- Brooklyn Brewery (United States) (24.5%)
- Four Roses Distillery (United States)
- Kirin Brewery of America LLC (United States)
- Kirin Europe GmbH (Germany)
- Lion Nathan Limited (Australia/New Zealand)
- Mandalay Brewery Limited (Myanmar)
- Myanmar Brewery Limited (Myanmar)
- New Belgium Brewing Company (United States)
- Bell's Brewing Company
- San Miguel Brewery (Philippines) (48.3%)
- Taiwan Kirin Company, Limited (Taiwan)
- Zhuhai Kirin President Brewery Company, Limited (China)

=== Soft drink business ===
- Coca-Cola Beverages Northeast (United States)

=== Pharmaceutical business ===
- Kirin-Amgen, Inc. (United States)
- Gemini Science, Inc. (United States)
- Hematech Inc. (United States)
- Jeil-Kirin Pharmaceutical, Inc. (South Korea)
- Kirin Pharmaceuticals Company, Limited (Taiwan)
- Kirin Pharmaceuticals (Asia) Company, Limited (Hong Kong, China)
- Kirin Kunpeng (China) Bio-Pharmaceutical Company, Limited (China)
- Blackmores Limited (Australia)

=== Agribio business ===
- Twyford International, Inc. (United States)
- Kirin Agribio EC B.V. (Paris Office) (France)
- Southern Glass House Produce, Limited (England)
- Fides Holding B.V. (Netherlands)
- Barberet & Blanc, S.A. (Spain)
- Qingdao International Seeds Company, Limited (China)
- Germicopa S.A. (France)
- Kirin Agribio Shanghai Company, Limited (China)

=== Other business ===
- Kirin Australia Pty., Limited (Australia)
- Indústria Agrícola Tozan Ltda. (Brazil)
- Jamieson Wellness (Canada; proposed acquisition, subject to approvals)

== See also ==
- Beer in Japan
- Kirin Cup
