= Frederick Ringer =

British merchant

- Born: 1838; Norwich, England
- Died: 1907 (aged 68–69); Norwich, England
- Occupation: Merchant

Frederick Ringer (1838–1907) was a British merchant who took over Thomas Glover's role as leader in the Nagasaki foreign settlement. Ringer House (built 1865) is situated in Glover Garden. During the decades from the late 19th to early 20th century, Ringer made great contributions to trade and industrial promotion in Nagasaki.

The Ringer Hut chain of fast-food restaurants, specialising in Nagasaki dishes Champon and Sara udon, is named after him.

== Family background ==
Frederick Ringer was born 1838 in Norwich but spent most of his life in Japan. Frederick, like his elder brother John, left Norwich for East Asia whilst still young. The middle brother of the three, Sydney Ringer MD, FRS (1836–1910) became an eminent physician, physiologist and pharmacologist at University College, London.

== Career ==
In 1856, at the age of 25, Frederick was already a tea inspector in China with the prominent English company of Fletcher & Co. This was early in the time of the fast tea clippers that literally raced to bring the seasonal tea cargoes to Europe; the Cutty Sark (built 1869) was one of the last of the clippers. Fortunes could be made—and lost—in the China tea trade. In 1865, Frederick was recruited by Glover & Co. to supervise the company's tea trade in Nagasaki, the great sea port on the western coast of Kyushu, Japan. In 1868, he joined with fellow Englishman Edward Z Holme to found Holme, Ringer & Co. Here, trade was also in tea initially, but soon expanded with the first burgeoning of Japanese industry to include shipping, coal, munitions and even to exports of seaweed, shark fins and vegetable wax, all important items of trade at that time. Holme left Japan soon after to conduct the London end of the business and eventually left the interests in Japan to his partner.

Frederick’s main associate at the Nagasaki end of the business was John C. Smith, who had worked with him previously at Glover & Co.

In 1888, Holme, Ringer & Co. moved its headquarters to No. 7 Oura, a choice location on the Nagasaki waterfront. Holme, Ringer & Co. served as Lloyd's representative in Nagasaki and agents for a long list of international banking, insurance and shipping companies. It also began to expand overseas, with branch offices in China and Korea, as well as conducting extensive trade with Russia. In the early 1890s, Holme, Ringer & Co. established a branch company in the port of Shimonoseki, giving it the Japanese name "Wuriu Shokwai" because, as a foreign entity, it was not allowed to establish a branch outside the treaty ports.

From the beginning, Frederick Ringer was an active participant in the political and social affairs of the Nagasaki foreign settlement. He was elected to the Municipal Council in 1874 and 5 years later served on the reception committee to welcome former US President Ulysses S. Grant to Nagasaki. From 1884, Ringer served as Consul for Belgium, and at various times was Acting Consul for Denmark, Sweden and Hawaii. He was also a guiding force in the establishment of the International Club in 1899.

Some of the context in which business was conducted in Japan at that time is revealed when considering two major national companies Mitsubishi and Mitsui. They both exported coal in large quantities, but their principal agent in Kyushu was none other than Wuriu Shokwai, the Holme, Ringer & Co. branch in Shimonoseki.

Frederick Ringer's contributions to the economic development of Nagasaki and Japan were enormous. Over the years, he established a mechanized flour mill, a steam laundry, petroleum storage facilities, and stevedoring, trawling and whaling concerns. By the late 1890s, thanks to the Sino-Japanese War, the Spanish–American War, and the presence of the Russian Winter Fleet, Nagasaki was a boomtown and Ringer was the dominant foreign merchant there. Reflections of his prosperity included the establishment of a daily English language newspaper, the Nagasaki Press, in 1897 and the construction of the opulent four-story Nagasaki Hotel, replete with electricity, private telephones and a French chef, on the waterfront the following year.

== Decline, death and legacy ==
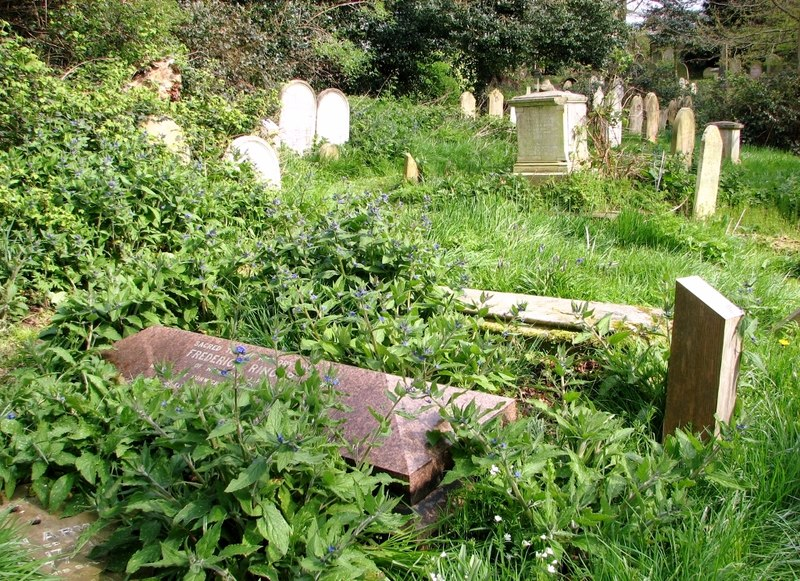
Grave at Rosary Cemetery, Norwich

Frederick Ringer remained in Nagasaki until 1906, when he traveled to England for health reasons. He briefly returned once more to Nagasaki, but was unable to stay long. He died in Norwich on 29 November 1907 at the age of 69 and is buried at the non-conformist cemetery at Rosary Road. His legacy includes a number of artifacts and donations to the Norwich Castle Museum.

Frederick was survived by his two sons, Fred and Sydney (named as a salute to his brother), both of whom had been born in Nagasaki. Fred died in Nagasaki in 1940 at the age of 56. In August of the same year, Sydney's two sons, Michael and Vanya, were arrested as spies by Japanese authorities and forced to leave the country. Sydney was required to close the Nagasaki office of Holme, Ringer & Co. in October 1940 and to flee to Shanghai, where he and his wife were later arrested and interned in a Japanese war camp.

Sydney's two sons; Michael and Vanya, joined the British Indian Army and were both stationed in Malaya when the Imperial Japanese Army invaded that country in December 1941. Vanya fought with the 5/14th Punjab Regiment until he was killed in action during the disastrous Battle of Slim River on 7 January 1942. Michael was evacuated from Singapore before its fall as a Japanese speaker, but he was captured in Sumatra where he spent the rest of the war as a prisoner. Michael was called as a witness to Japanese atrocities after the war.

After the war, the ‘Japanese’ Sydney Ringer sold off most of the property in Nagasaki and eventually returned to England, where he died in 1967. Holme, Ringer & Co. was restarted by former Japanese employees and is still in business today in Moji, Kitakyushu City. The only remaining evidence of the once considerable Ringer presence in Nagasaki is the old stone residence at No.2 Minamiyamate sitting high above Nagasaki Harbour and now preserved in Glover Garden between the other two British mansions from days gone by—the former Glover and Alt houses.
