= Ringer Hut =

Japanese fast-food restaurant chain

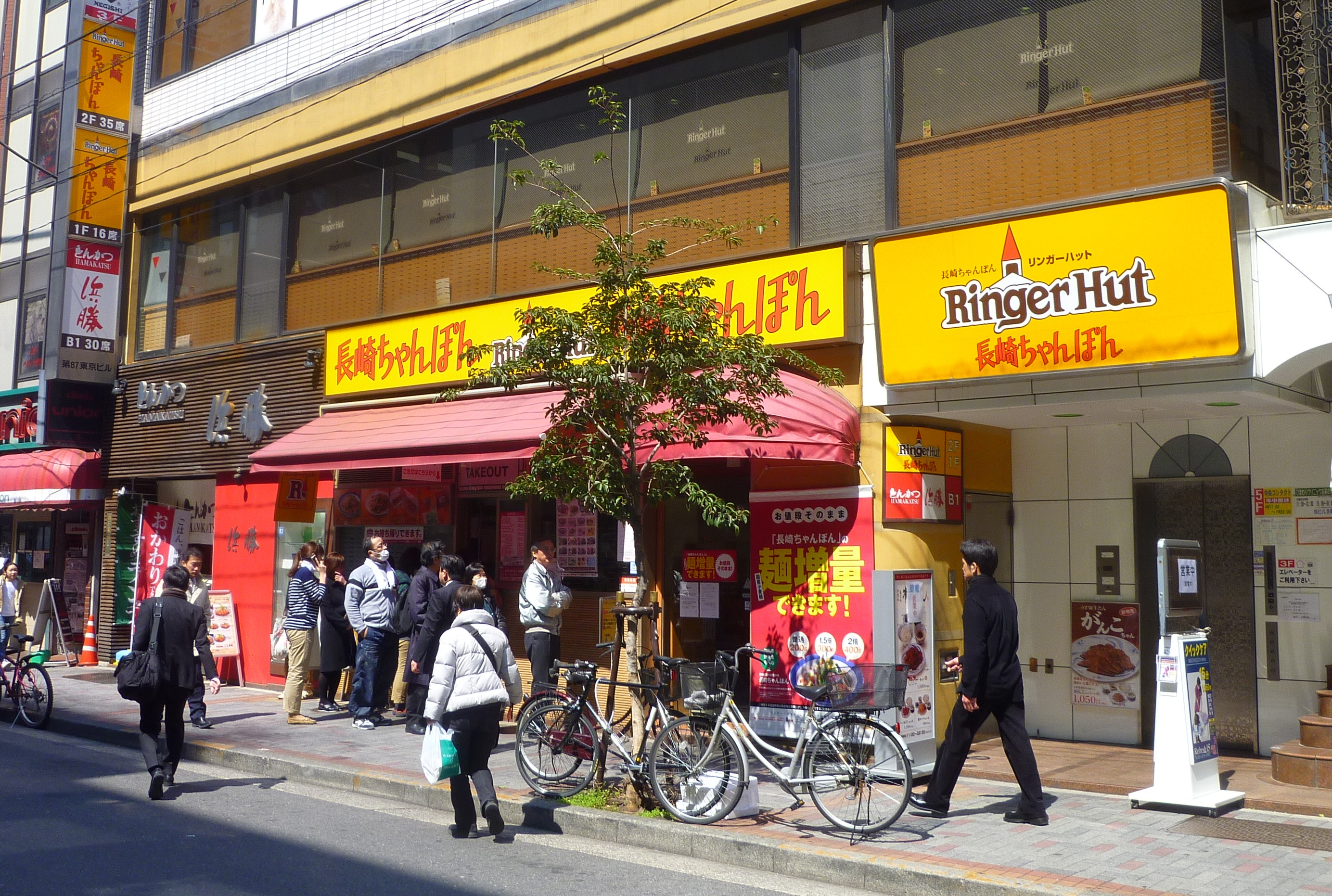
A branch in Ochanomizu, Tokyo.

Ringer Hut (リンガーハット) is a Japanese chain of fast-food restaurants, specializing in Nagasaki dishes Champon and Sara udon. The Hamakatsu Co. of Nagasaki, founders of the chain in 1974, borrowed the name of the former Ringer House which had been purchased by Nagasaki City and opened as a tourist attraction in 1966. It is likely that the company borrowed the word "hut" from "Pizza Hut." In 2009 Ringer Hut operated over 550 restaurants in Japan and Taiwan, along with 100 Hamakatsu Restaurants (tonkatsu restaurant chain). Ringer Hut has two headquarters located in Fukuoka and Tokyo.

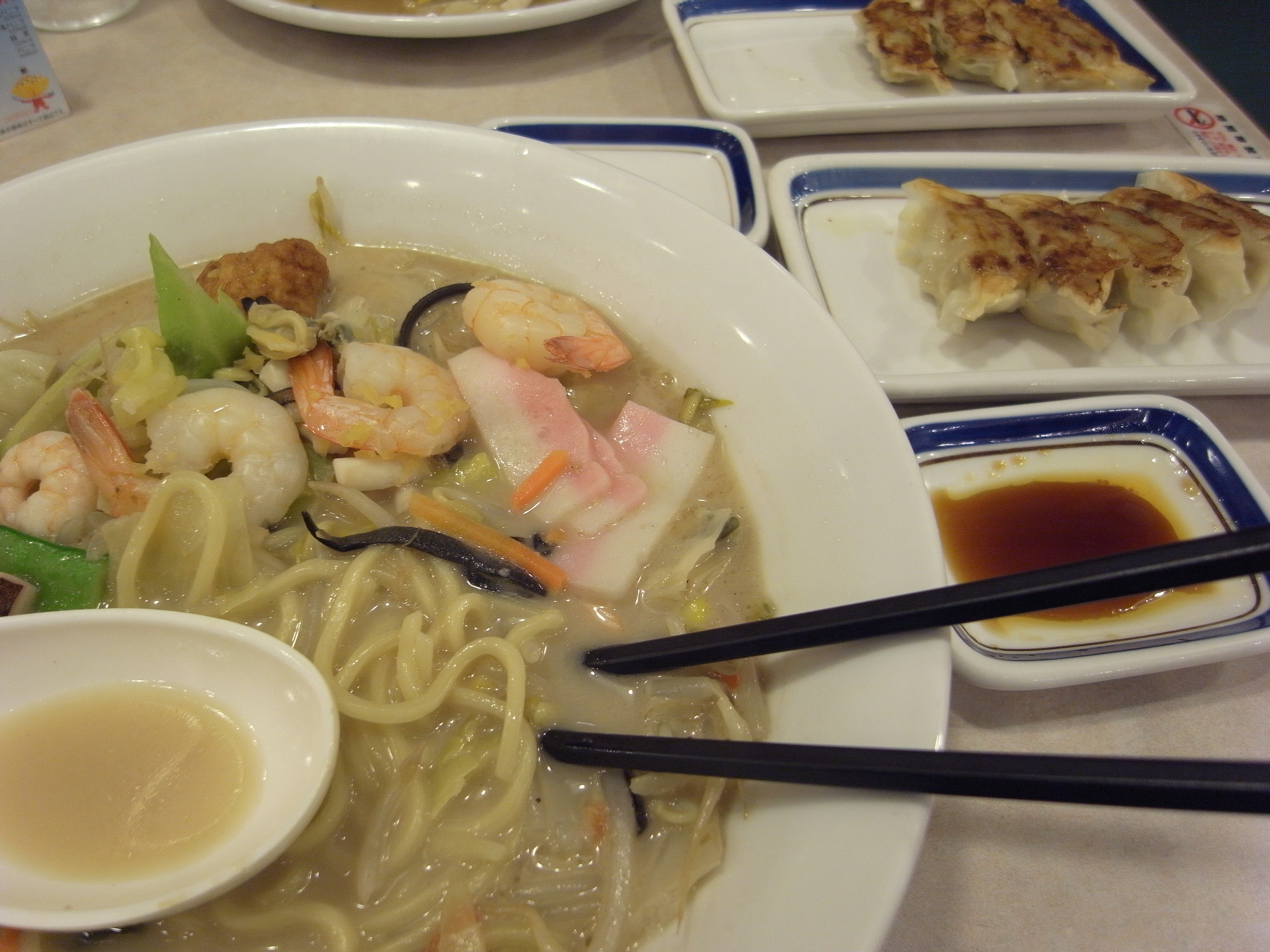

== History ==
=== Name ===
Frederick Ringer was a British merchant who became a leader in the Nagasaki foreign settlement. His former house is preserved today in Glover Garden in Nagasaki. The home was built circa 1868 by the Glover family and later purchased by Fredrick Ringer. A native of Norwich, England, Ringer came to Japan in 1865 and founded Holme, Ringer & Co. three years later. He made significant contributions to the development of Nagasaki and Japan. His major accomplishments include the development of a mechanical flour mill, petroleum storage, a steam laundry, and fishing and whaling enterprises. In the 1890s Nagasaki was a thriving international port and Fredrick Ringer was its most influential foreign merchant. In 1897, Ringer created the Nagasaki Press, an English-language newspaper. He led the construction of a lavish four-story hotel that included its own electric power plant and had telephones in each room. His family was forced to leave Nagasaki on the eve of World War II, but Holme, Ringer & Co. was restarted by former Japanese employees in the city of Moji (Fukuoka Prefecture) after the war and remains in business to this day.

Memories of Frederick Ringer had been largely forgotten in Nagasaki by the time Hamakatsu Co. founded Ringer Hut. There is no historical connection between Ringer Hut and either Holme, Ringer and Co. or the Ringer family.

=== Joint venture in China ===
A joint venture between Ringer Hut and frozen food maker Katokichi Co ended November 1, 2003. The joint 100-million yen venture began in August 2002. Ringer Hut was the primary investor by investing 70 percent to Katokichi 30 percent. Ringer Hut in China became an independent whole subsidiary by purchasing all stakes owed by Katokichi. The company began their venture by opening their first restaurant in November 2002, and their second restaurant was opened in December of the same year. Within six months, the restaurants recorded significant losses. As a result, Ringer Hut returned the menu to the traditional Japanese style ones. The changes to the menu resulted in a reduced contribution from Katokichi. Ringer Hut closed one of their China restaurants in December 2003. The restaurant closure resulted in a 36 million yen loss for Ringer Hut Co. The total deficit for the business year is estimated at 670 million yen.
