= Nagasaki foreign settlement =

Area in Nagasaki settled by foreigners

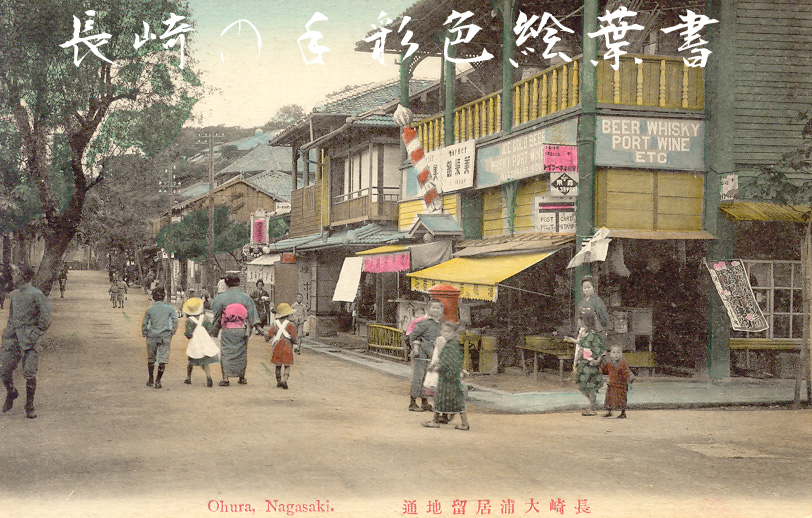
Oura district, Nagasaki

The Nagasaki foreign settlement (長崎居留地), sometimes called the Oura foreign settlement (大浦居留地), was an area in Nagasaki, Japan, settled by foreigners as Japan opened its doors to Western trade. The area was established by treaties between the West and Japan in the mid-to-late 1850s, and remained an important center of Western life in Japan until the outbreak of World War II.

This settlement saw many firsts for Japan, including the first international telegraph and also the first use of a steam locomotive, the "Iron Duke," on a short track in the Oura district.

Nagasaki holds a festival in mid-September that focuses on the foreign settlement.

== Development ==
A series of encounters between the West and Japan in the 1850s ended Japan's isolationist trade policies. In particular, the treaty with Russia, signed on February 7, 1855, established Nagasaki as an open port and, further, granted extraterritoriality privileges to foreigners living in Japan. These encounters finally culminated in 1859 when the Ansei Treaties, and in particular the Harris Treaty with the United States, took effect. These treaties demanded immediate opening of ports, and also established generally unequal trade relationships between the Western powers and Japan.

In 1860 development of the area around Oura Creek began; by August 15, 1862, Japanese officials ordered foreign residents of Nagasaki into this new settlement area.

== Decline and dismantling ==
By 1894, the treaties that led to the formation of the foreign settlement had been abolished, and new ones became effective in 1899. On that date, the foreign settlement returned fully to Japanese control. Tariffs returned to Japanese after the treaty with the United States, signed on February 21, 1911. Despite these political changes, the momentum established in the previous decades continued, and this area of Nagasaki continued to be an important hub of trade and settlement for Westerners.

In the run up to World War II, however, the foreign population of the settlement declined, so that few were left as hostilities broke out.

== Residents ==
- Chinese residents made up the largest foreign group at the settlement for much of the late nineteenth to early twentieth centuries.
- Western residents:
  - The British made up the majority of the western residents, notably, in 1870 about 40% of the foreign population was British dealing mostly in the trade sector.
  - The rest of the Western residents mostly consisted of missionaries, merchant staff, and sailors from a variety of different countries
  - Some Russian naval officers even had long term relationships with Japanese women, including living together and having children. Even though some of these couples did not marry, these families did not face any prejudice.
  - Thomas Blake Glover – Scottish merchant

== See also ==
- Dejima
- Ansei Treaties
- Glover Garden
- Treaty of Amity and Commerce (United States–Japan)
- Ōura Church
- Nagasaki
- Bakumatsu
- Nagasaki (in Japanese)
- Foreign settlement (Japan)
- Foreign Settlement—Nagasaki (in Japanese)
