= Gyoza no Ohsho =

Japanese restaurant chain

Ohsho Food Service Corp.

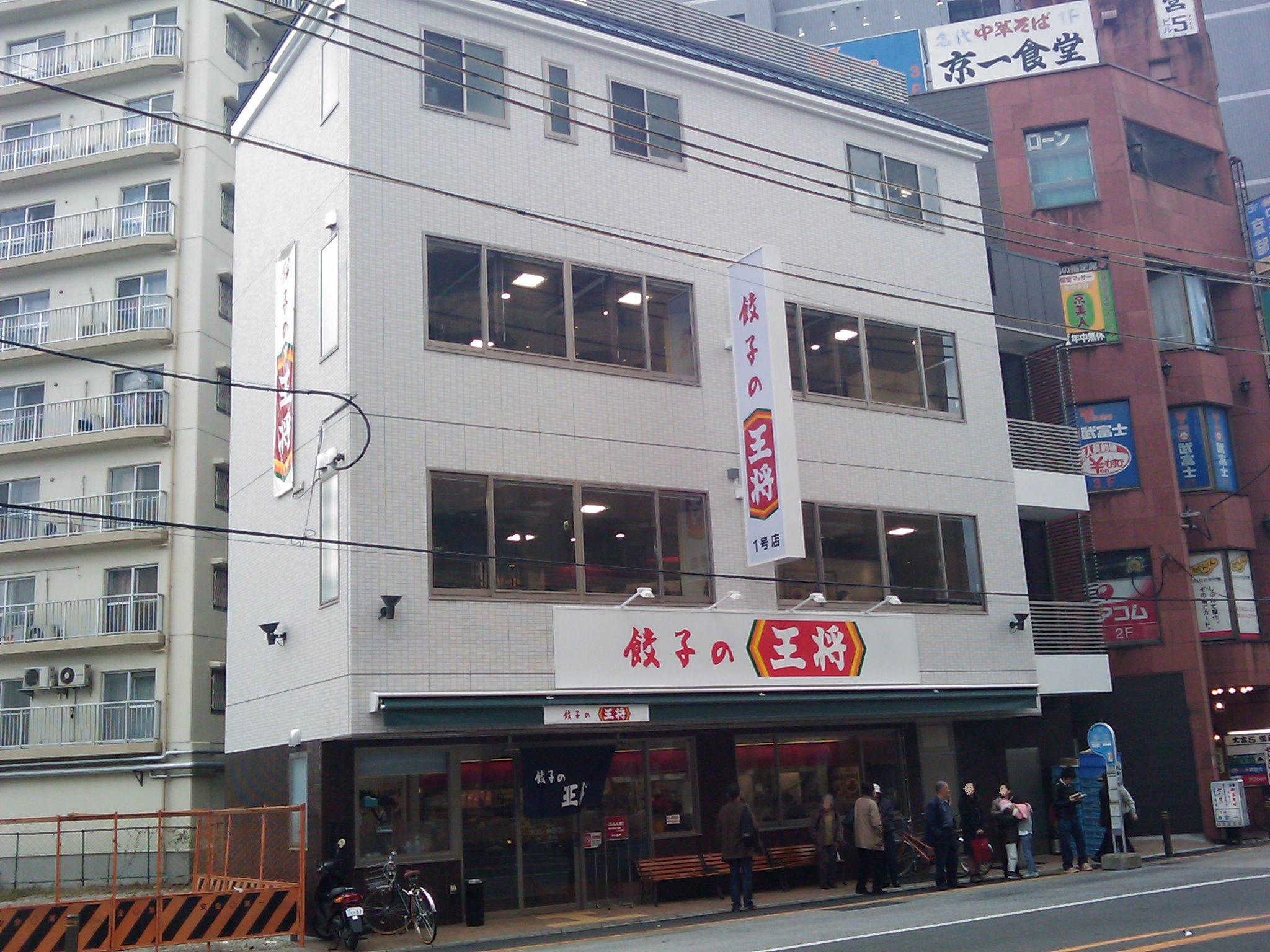
- The first restaurant was opened in Shijō—Ōmiya.
- Native name: Ohsho Food Service
- Formerly: 餃子の王将チェーン
- Company type: Public KK
- Traded as: TYO: 9936
- Industry: Foodservice
- Founded: December 25, 1967; 58 years ago in Kyoto
- Headquarters: Yamashina-ku, Kyoto, Japan
- Area served: Japan
- Products: Food
- Brands: Gyoza no Ohsho
- Revenue: ▼US$ 666.5 million (FY2015)
- Net income: ▲US$ 55.4 million (FY2015)
- Total assets: ▼US$ 548.8 million (2016)
- Total equity: ▲US$ 388.8 million (2016)
- Owner: Asahi Breweries, Ltd. (11.5%); Japan Food Business Co., Ltd. (8.6%); Ariake Japan (5.6%)
- Number of employees: 2,000 (2016)
- Website: ohsho.co.jp

Gyoza no Ohsho (餃子の王将, Gyōza no Ōshō; lit. King of Gyoza) is a Japanese restaurant chain serving gyōza and other food from Japanese Chinese cuisine. There are over 700 Ohsho restaurants in Japan. Ohsho restaurants may be either owned and operated by the parent company or franchises operated by independent owners. All will offer the standardized Ohsho Grand Menu, featuring helpful photographs of all the dishes, along with individually created set menus particular to that location. Stamp card campaigns allow patrons to collect stamps for every visit, with one stamp being given for every 500 yen spent. Completed stamp cards can be exchanged for Ohsho Member Cards, valid until the end of the year, which offer either a five percent or a seven percent discount on every bill. After placing their order customers receive a small clipboard with a printout of their order and the price; this will be updated if further foods or drinks are ordered, and thus it serves as a running tally that is usually laid face up in front of a customer until everything ordered has been delivered, then it will be flipped over to indicate to the waitstaff that a particular customer is not waiting for anything more to be delivered to the table. Upon finishing, patrons are expected to carry this clipboard to the cash register to settle the bill. After an unsuccessful venture in China, Ohsho established an overseas presence by opening a store in Kaohsiung, Taiwan in 2017.

== Incident ==
The president, Takayuki Ohigashi (age 72) was shot to death in front of the headquarters in Kyoto on December 19, 2013.

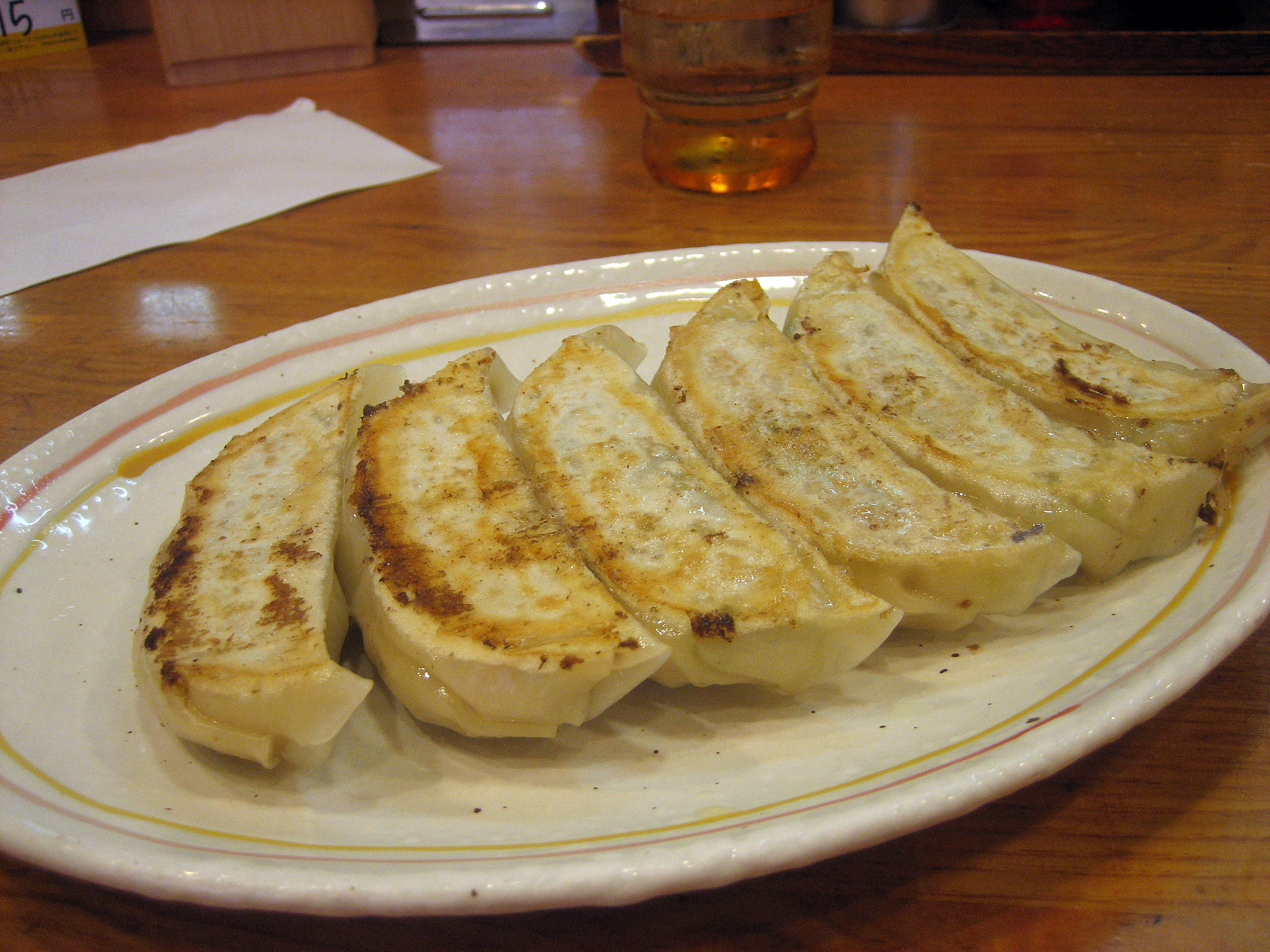
A plate of fried dumplings (gyōza)

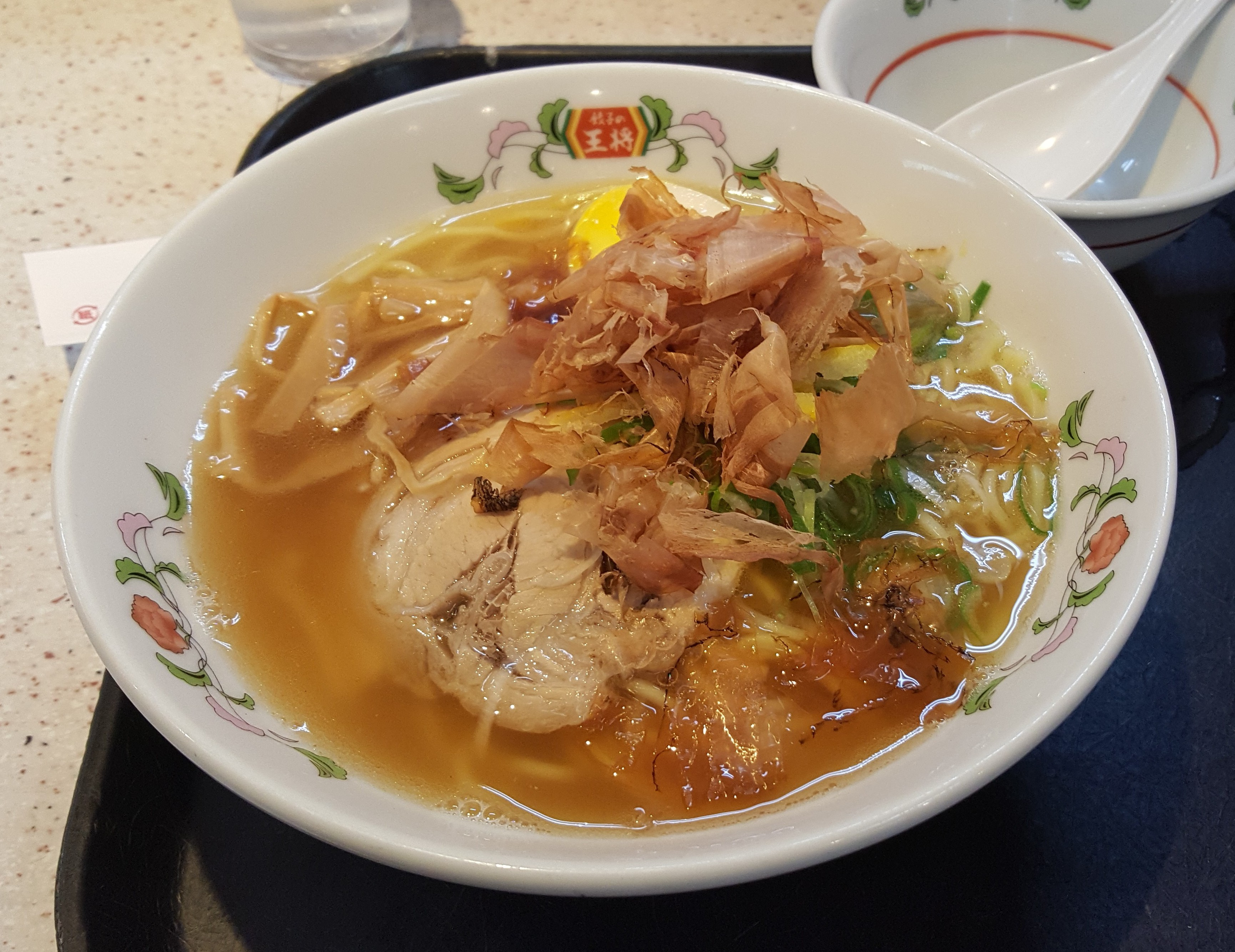
Shoyu ramen

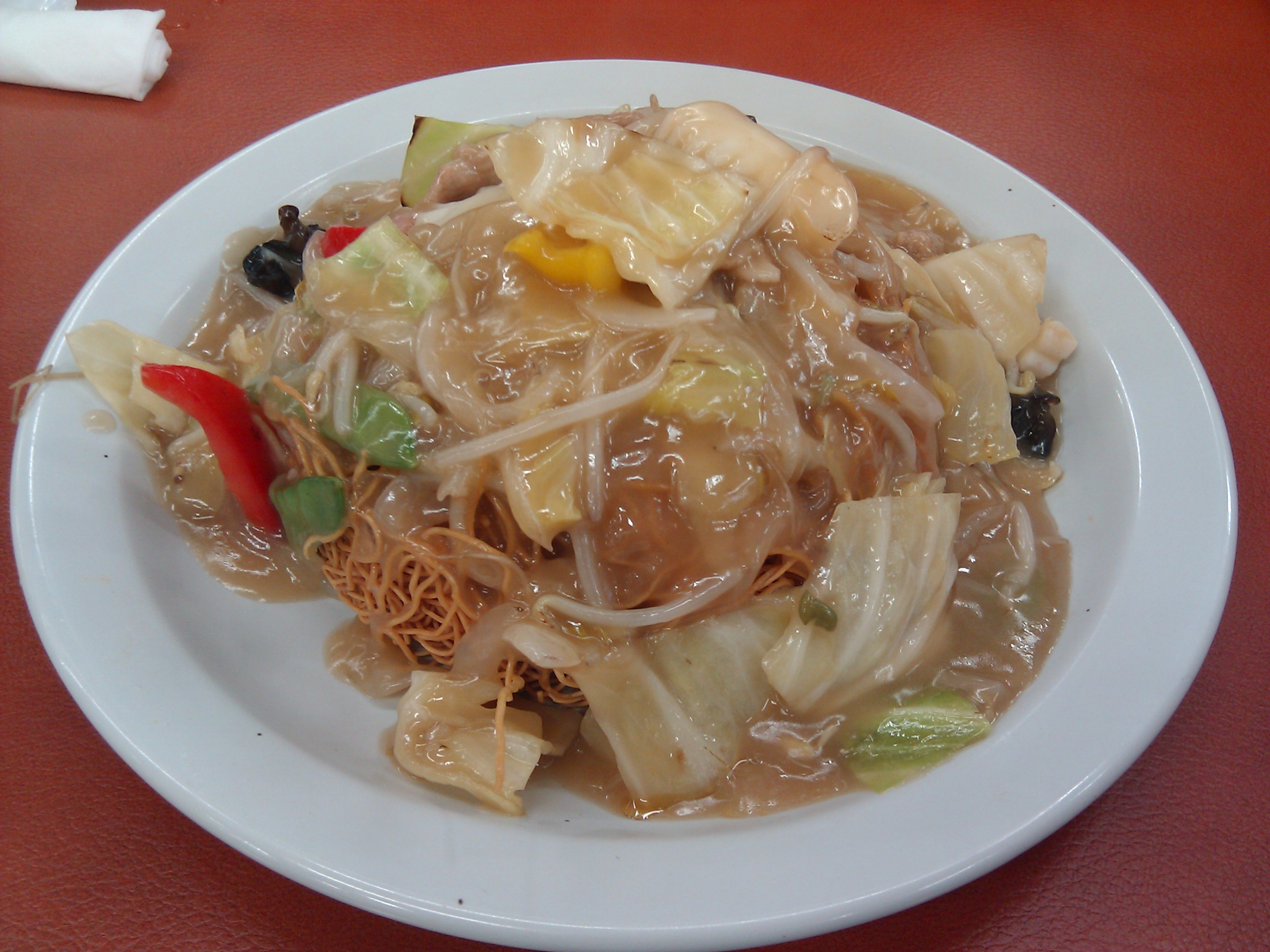
Sara udon

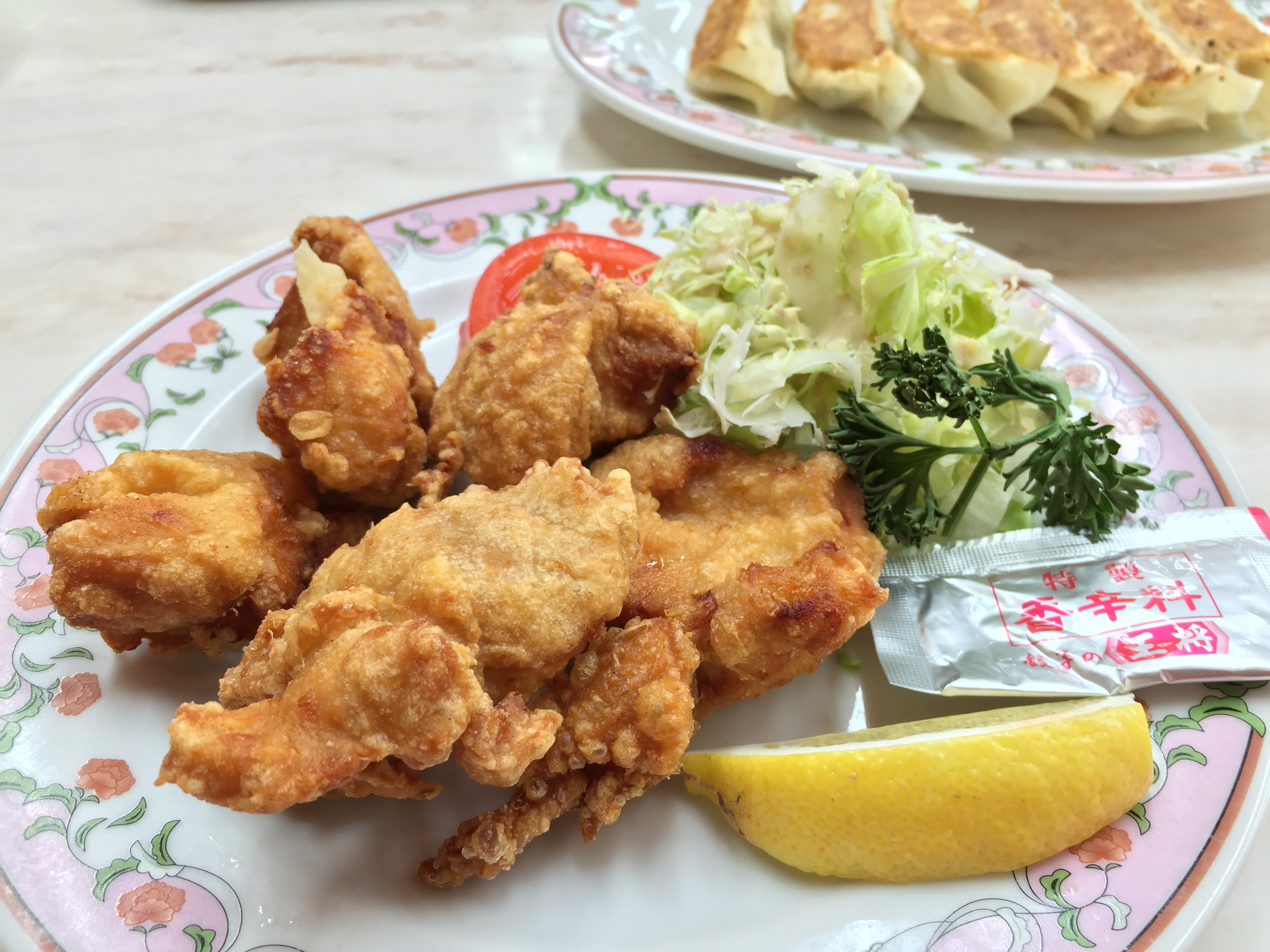
Chicken karaage

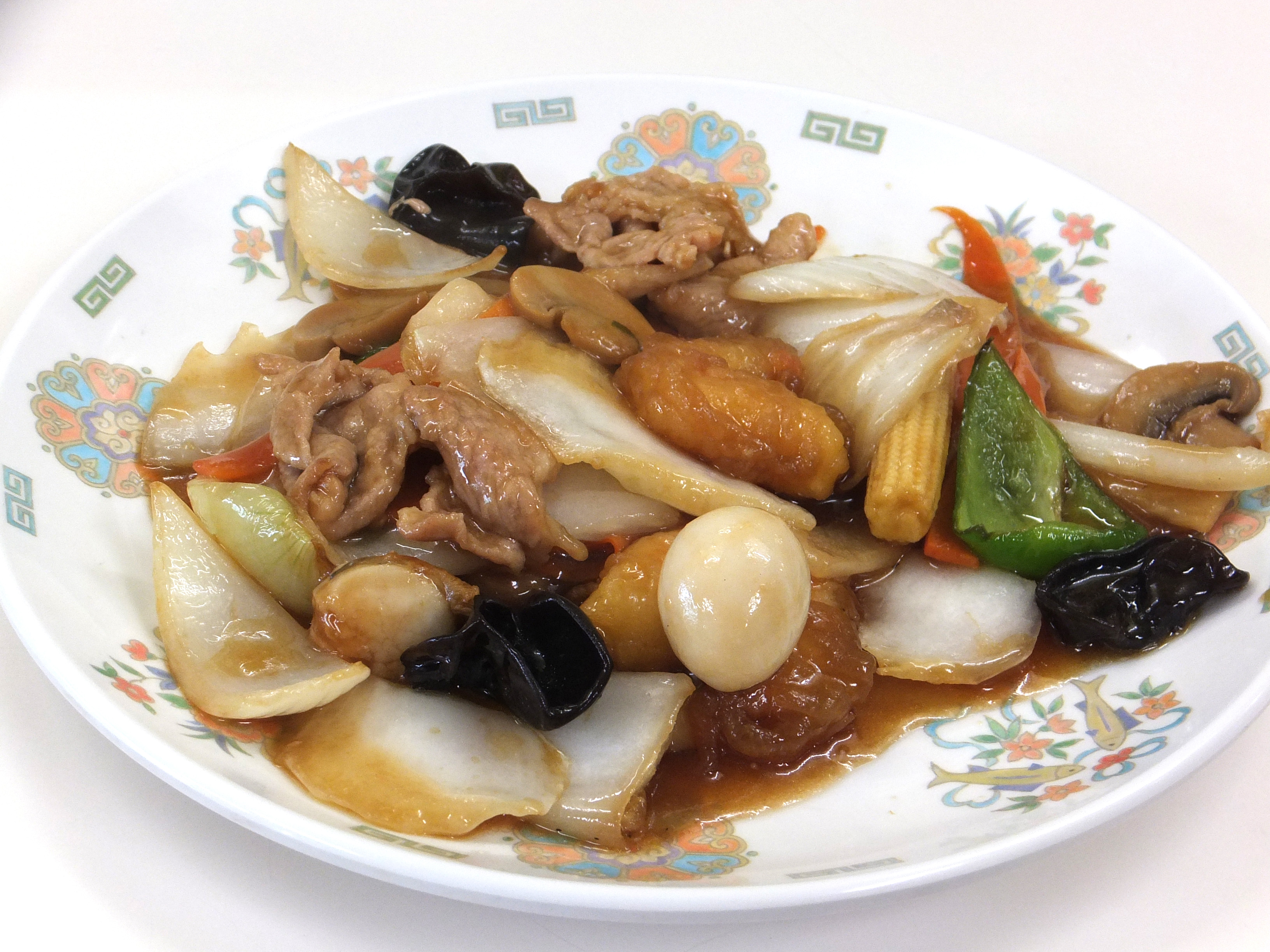
Happosai

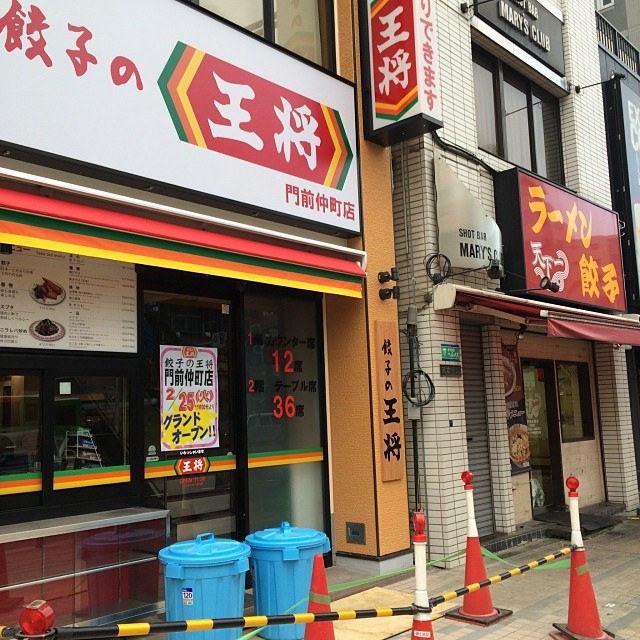
Restaurant location Monzen-Nakachō Station
