= Babaocai =

Chinese dish

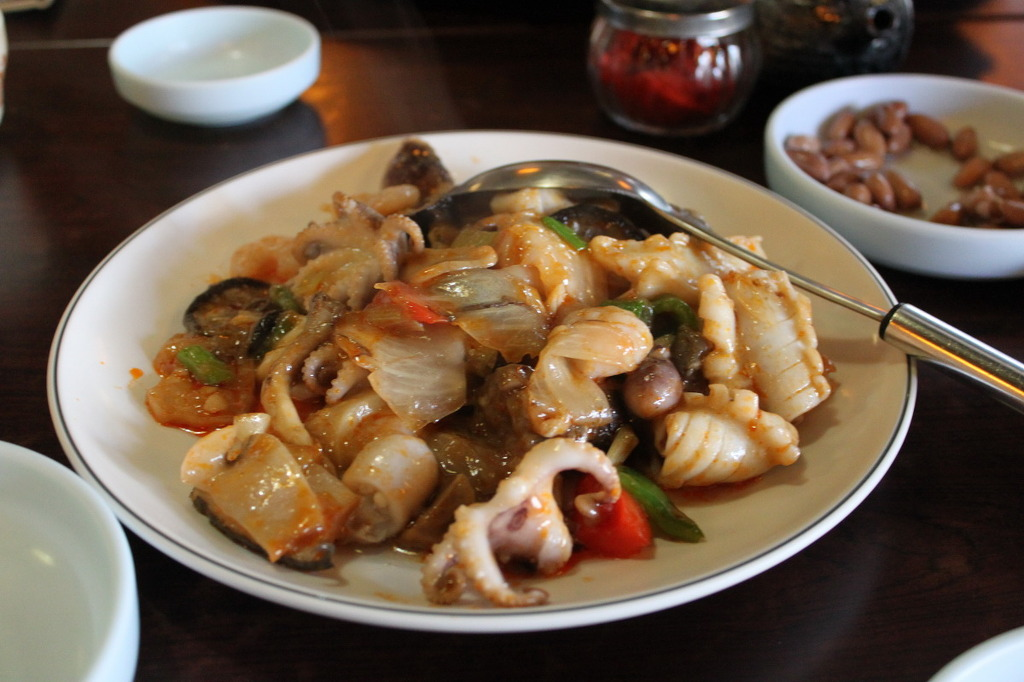
- Chinese: 八寶菜
Transcriptions

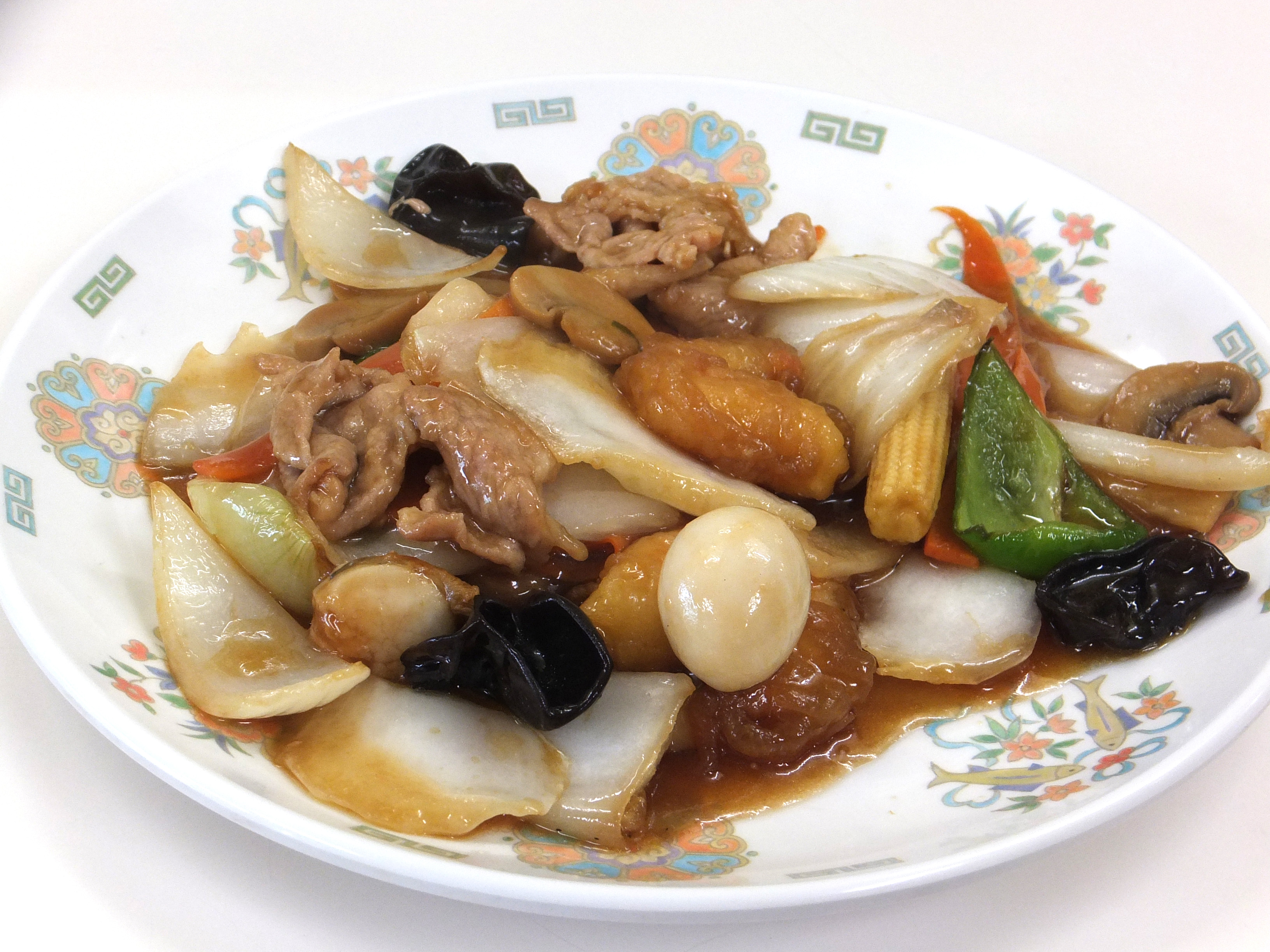
Gyoza no Ohsho

Babaocai (Chinese: 八寶菜; pinyin: bābǎocài) is a typical Chinese dish that is made by stir-frying various vegetables, seafood, and other leftovers. It can be eaten as a side or be used to top a bowl of rice.

Babaocai is a combination of eight ingredients. "Babao" (八寶) means "eight treasures," and cai (菜) means "vegetables," "dishes," or "side dishes." Babaocai contains seafood such as sea cucumbers, shrimp, squid, and vegetables such as bamboo shoots. Meat, tofu, eggs, and other leftovers can also be added. The ingredients are chopped and stir-fried in a wok or pan, and the dish is seasoned with soy sauce and sesame oil.

The dish is known as palbochae (팔보채) in Korean and as happosai in Japanese.

== History ==
There are various theories about the origin of babaocai. At the end of the Qing Dynasty of China, the Mok Jung Emperor's birth mother was a renowned gourmet known to order 120 kinds of side dishes. Her chefs would prepare the dishes, taste the remaining ingredients, and then taste the food. Another theory is that in the 11th century, farmers in Liaoning province began to eat various foods they once ate with tea while chatting during work breaks.

== See also ==
- Chinese cuisine
