= Sara udon =

Japanese noodle dish topped with vegetables

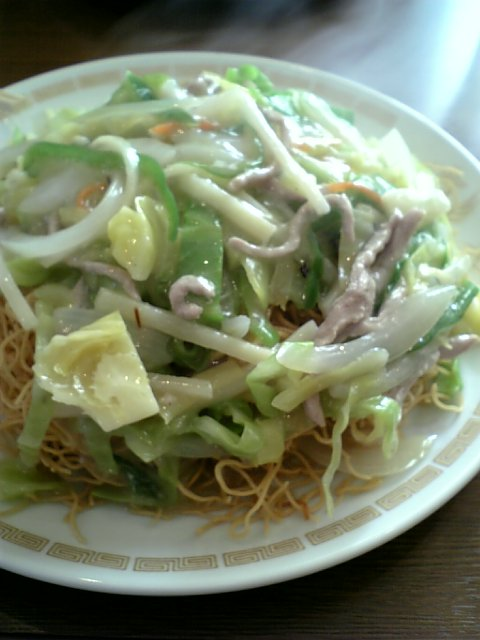
- Sara udon with thin noodles served in Kyoto
- Type: Japanese noodles
- Place of origin: Japan
- Region or state: Nagasaki prefecture
- Main ingredients: Noodles, cabbage, bean sprouts, squid, prawns, pork, kamaboko

Sara udon (皿うどん), literally "plate noodles", is a dish native to Nagasaki prefecture, Japan. Despite the name, it is not a kind of udon.

The dish consists of a base of noodles, and a topping of fried cabbage, bean sprouts and other vegetables, as well as squid, prawns, pork, kamaboko etc. There are two main varieties of noodles, thinner crispy noodles fried in oil (called pari pari, bari bari, or bari men); as a result this variation is reminiscent of Cantonese-style chow mein. Another variation uses thicker Chinese noodles (called chanpon noodles).

The style and thickness of noodles varies between restaurants. Many restaurants outside Nagasaki prefecture serve only thin noodles, which has led to the common misconception that the dish is only ever served with thin noodles.

If many people are eating together, it is customary for everyone to take their portion from a single large central dish.

There are food delivery services (demae) that specialise in sara udon for parties or offices that are working overtime.

Sara udon is sometimes served in school meals at grade schools in Nagasaki prefecture.

== Gallery ==
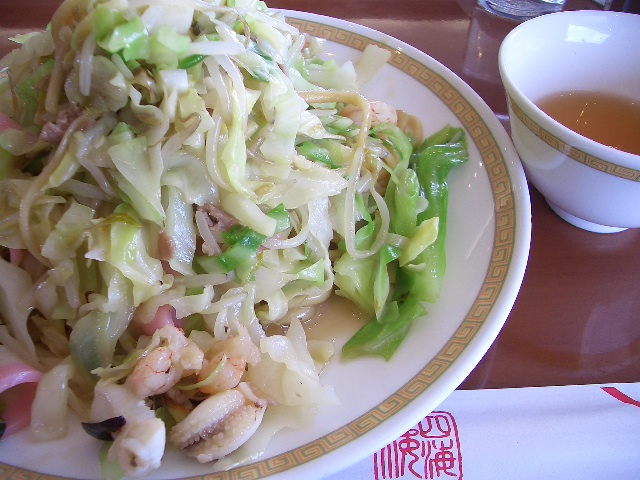
Served with thick noodles in Nagasaki

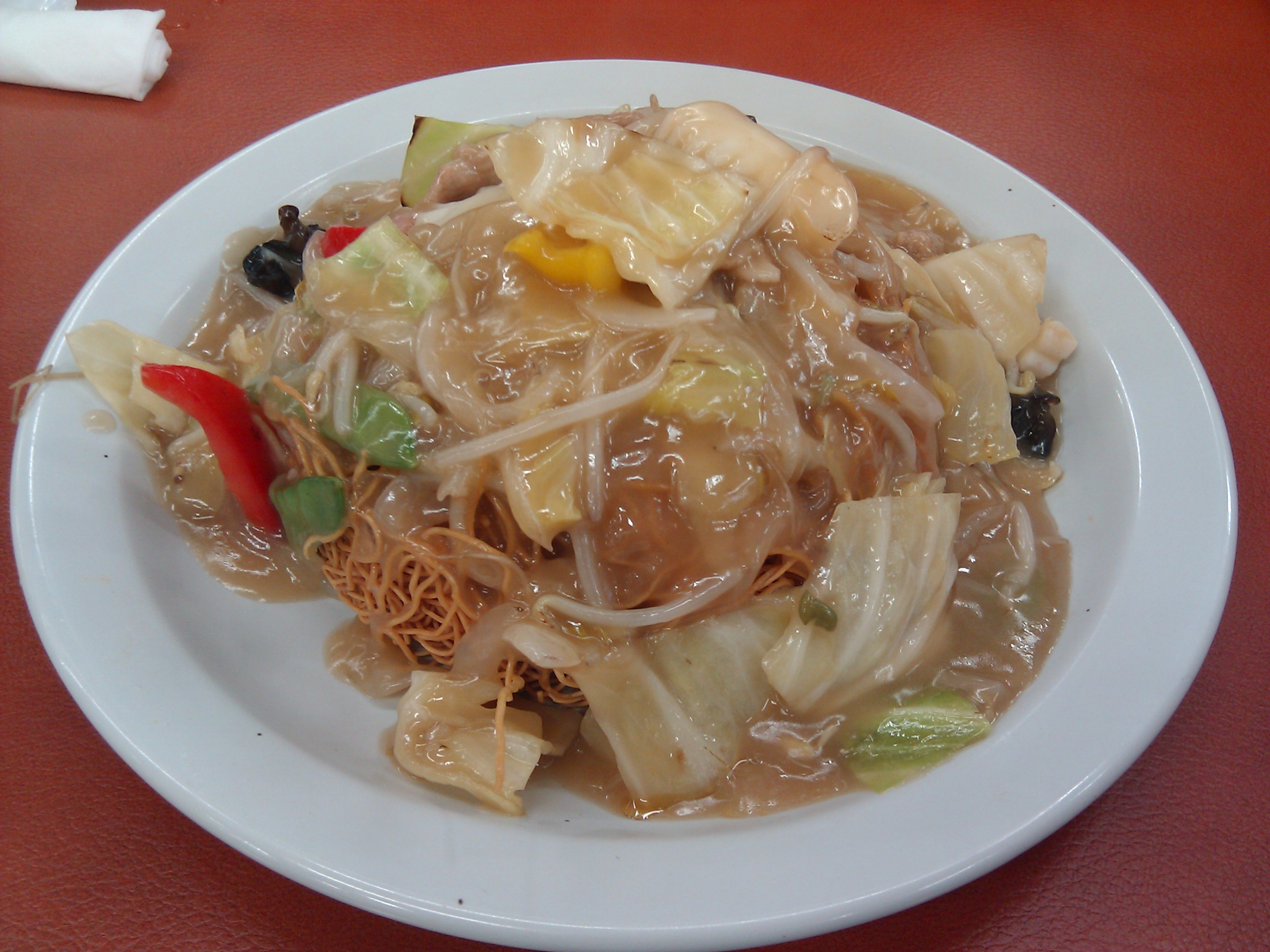
Sara-udon (Gyoza no Ohsho)

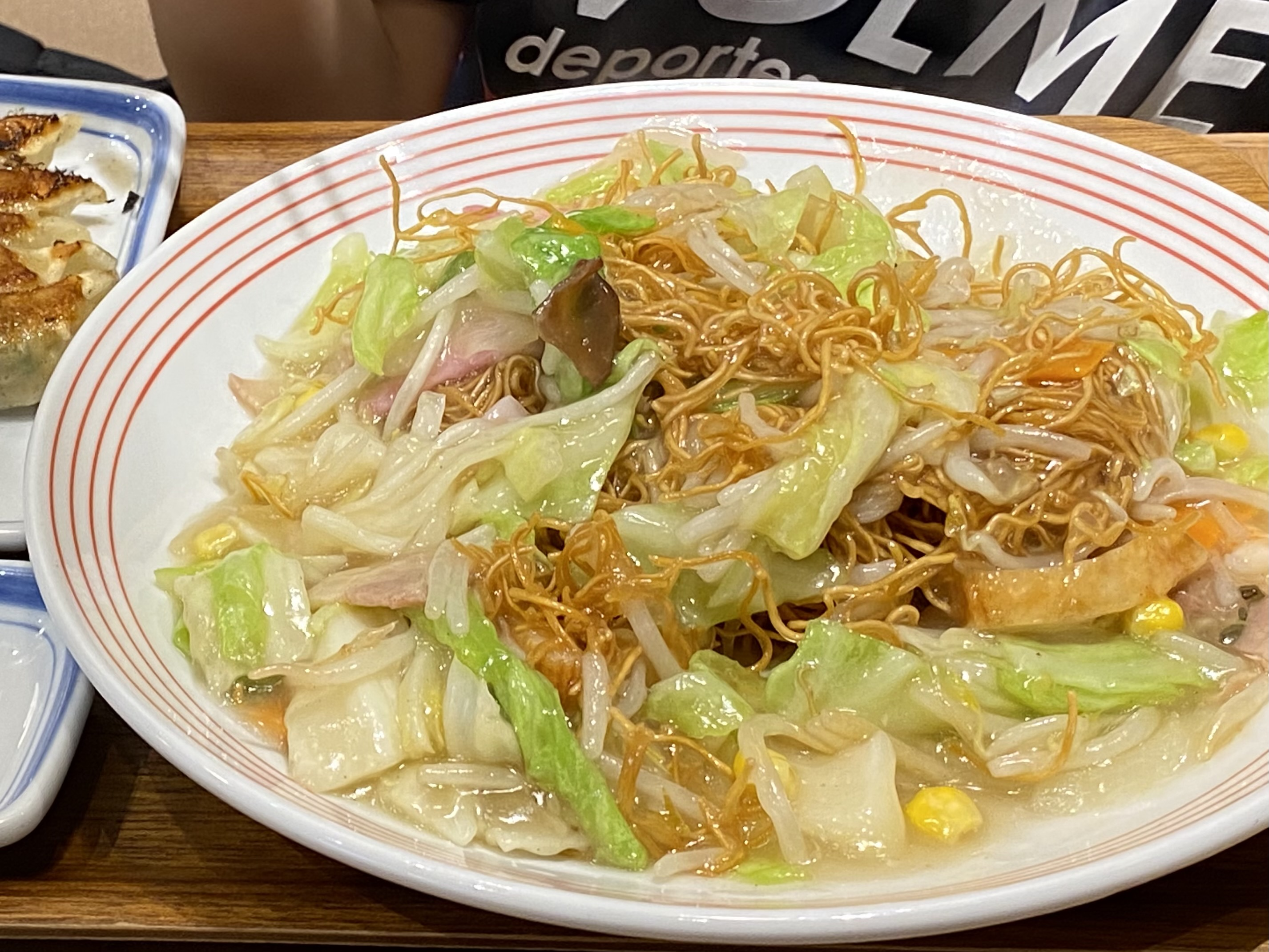
Sara-udon from Ringer Hut

== See also ==
- Chanpon
- Chow mein
- Ifumi
- Nagasaki Chinatown
- Ringer Hut
