= Thomas Blake Glover =

Scottish merchant (1838–1911)

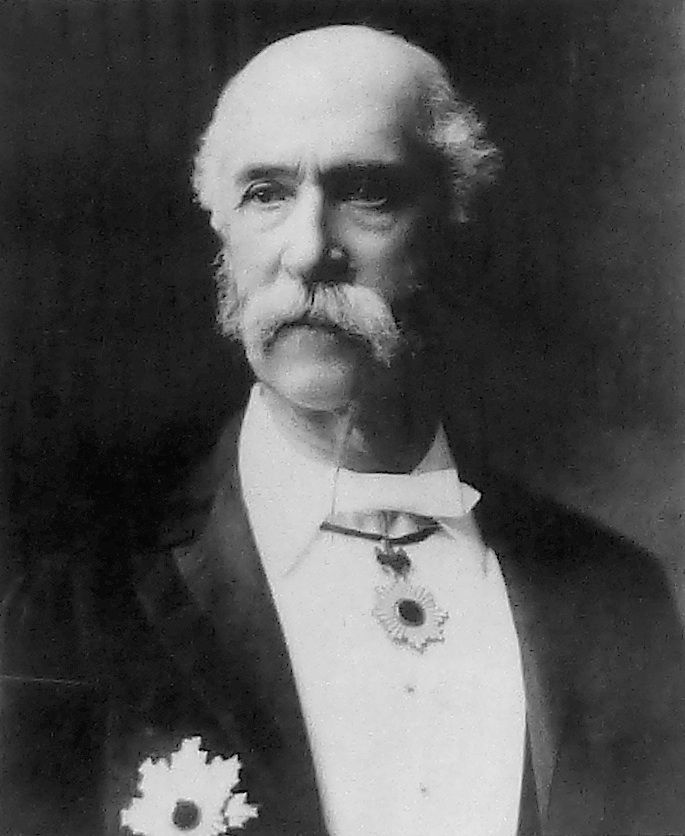
- Born: 6 June 1838; Fraserburgh, Aberdeenshire, Scotland
- Died: 16 December 1911 (aged 73); Tokyo, Empire of Japan
- Occupation: Businessman
- Spouse: Awajiya Tsuru

Thomas Blake Glover (6 June 1838 – 16 December 1911) was an Anglo-Scottish merchant in Bakumatsu and Meiji-period Japan.

== Early life (1838–1858) ==
Thomas Blake Glover was born at 15 Commerce Street, Fraserburgh, Aberdeenshire in northeast Scotland on 6 June 1838, the fifth of eight children, to Thomas Berry Glover (1806-1878), a coastguard officer from Vauxhall, London and Mary Findlay (1807-1887) from the parish of Fordyce, Banffshire. Thomas Blake Glover spent the first six years of his life in Fraserburgh, which was fast expanding as a fishing and trading port.

In 1844, the family moved first to coastguard stations at Grimsby, then Collieston in Aberdeenshire, then finally to the Bridge of Don, by Aberdeen, Thomas senior having by this time been promoted to Chief Coastguard Officer. Young Thomas was educated first at the recently opened parish school in Fraserburgh, then in primary schools in Grimsby, Collieston, and finally at the Chanonry School in Old Aberdeen. Upon leaving school, Glover took a job as a shipping clerk with the trading company Jardine Matheson and in 1857 he moved to Shanghai.

== Japan (1859–1911) ==
In 1859, aged 21, Glover crossed from Shanghai to Nagasaki and worked initially buying Japanese green tea. Two years later, he founded his own firm, Glover and Co. (Guraba-Shokai).

His business was based in Nagasaki. It was here that he had his home constructed; the building remains today as the oldest Western-style building in Japan.

Anti-western sentiment was rife in Japan in the Bakumatsu period due to the unbalanced treaty agreements imposed upon the Tokugawa shogunate by the United States and other western powers, which included extraterritorial rights. Nationalistic militants in Satsuma and Chōshū spearheaded anti-government efforts aimed at toppling the Shogunate and restoring the Emperor as sovereign. It was these factions, later to become leaders in the Meiji Restoration government, that Glover supplied with arms and warships.

Some of the arms sales to rebellious factions in the Western regions of Japan (i.e., Satsuma and Choshu) were conducted in violation of treaty agreements between Great Britain and Japan as well as Japanese law.

The Bakufu had made "a pointed request to the British Queen not to allow the illicit trade. The Shogun himself sent her a personal letter," Glover explained, and to sell arms to a rebel force would be a treaty violation. "Glover feels sorry for us," Kido explained to the Seijido [Political Council] in Yamaguchi, "but there is nothing he can do". The Scot did have a suggestion to circumvent the Bakufu. If Choshu would send a vessel directly to Shanghai to buy rifles, "Glover will do everything in his power to buy and load as many guns as we want; he seems to be deeply committed to us on this matter."

In the end Glover provided the needed rifles directly from Nagasaki, and accompanied Ito Hirobumi back to Shimonoseki, on 15 October 1865, for his first personal meeting with Kido, who noted: "Trading with our han is strictly prohibited for a foreigner; therefore, Glover is very reluctant about dealing with us," explained Kido; and he had not told his own crew about the sale of guns, which, in any case, were not aboard that ship. If discovered, Glover could be prohibited from engaging in foreign trade for three years, and even fined or imprisoned.

In 1863, Glover helped the Chōshū Five travel to London on Jardine Matheson ships. He also helped send fifteen trainees from Satsuma under Godai Tomoatsu in 1865. The same year, he was also responsible for bringing a small-scale steam locomotive and cars to Japan, which he demonstrated on a short track in the Ōura district of Nagasaki, causing a sensation and alerting Japan to the benefits of railway transportation.

As Glover had assisted in toppling the Tokugawa Shogunate during the Boshin War, he had cordial relations with the new Meiji government. These links led to his being responsible for commissioning one of the first warships in the Imperial Japanese Navy (the Jo Sho Maru, later called Ryūjō Maru), which was built by Alexander Hall and Company in Aberdeen and launched on 27 March 1869. Glover also commissioned the smaller Hosho Maru for the navy and the Kagoshima for the Satsuma clan from the same Aberdeen shipyard.

In 1868, Glover made a contract with the Nabeshima clan of Saga Domain in Hizen Province and began to develop Japan's first coal mine at Hashima Island, Takashima. He also brought the first dry dock to Japan.

Thomas Glover went bankrupt in 1870, but he stayed in Japan to manage the Takashima coal mine after the Restoration for the mine's Dutch owners until it was taken over by the Meiji government. In 1881, the mine was acquired by Iwasaki Yatarō.

Glover was a key figure in the industrialisation of Japan, helping to found the shipbuilding company which was later to become the Mitsubishi Corporation of Japan. Negotiating the sale of William Copeland's Spring Valley Brewery in Yokohama, Glover also helped establish the Japan Brewery Company, which later became the major Kirin Brewery Company, Ltd. An urban myth has it that the moustache of the mythical creature featured on Kirin beer labels is in fact a tribute to Glover (who sported a similar moustache).

In recognition of these achievements, he was awarded the Order of the Rising Sun (second class).

Thomas Blake Glover died of kidney disease at his home in Tokyo in 1911, and was buried at the Sakamoto International Cemetery in Nagasaki.

== Family ==
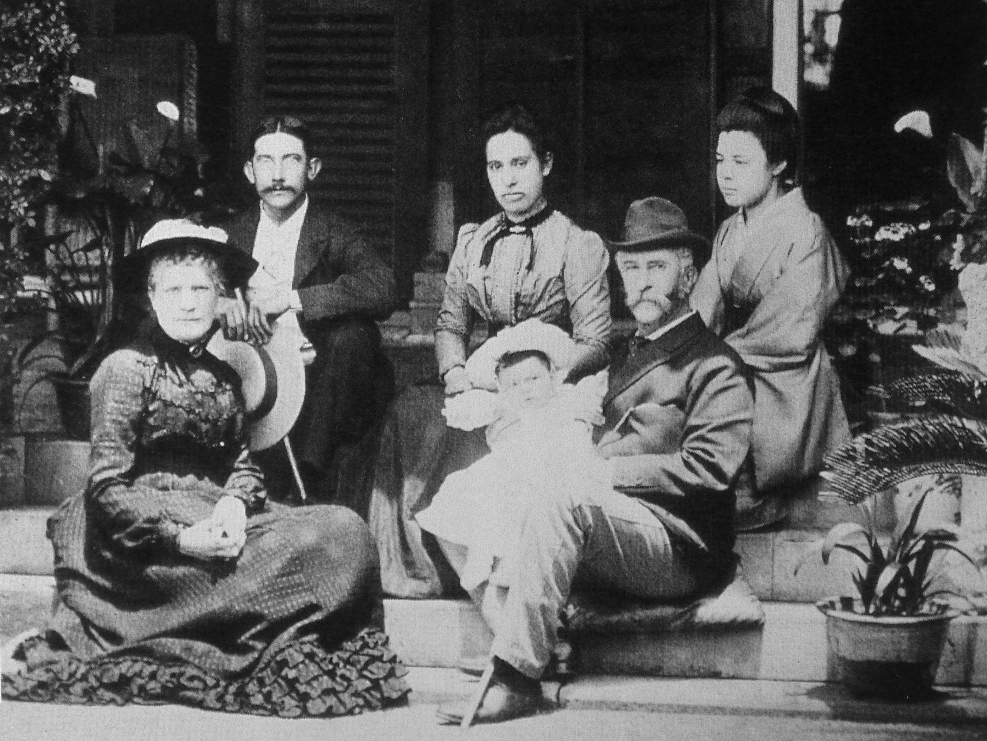
Glover (holding grandson) and family, c. 1900

Thomas Glover had a common-law marital relationship with a Japanese woman named Awajiya Tsuru (淡路屋 ツル), a native of Bungo province (present day Oita Prefecture) whom he apparently met in Osaka in the early 1870s. Glover and Tsuru remained together until the latter's death in 1899. The couple had a daughter named Hana, born in Nagasaki in 1876. Hana wed British merchant Walter George Bennett in 1897 and later moved with him to Korea, where she died in 1938. She had four children but only one grandchild, Ronald Walter Bennett (1931-2024), who lived in the United States.

Thomas Glover (Japanized as Gurabā or Kuraba) also adopted a British-Japanese son, later named Kuraba Tomisaburō (倉場 富三郎) (1870–1945), who was born in Nagasaki and went on to make important contributions to the economy of this city in the late 19th and early 20th centuries. Tomisaburō married Nakano Waka (中野 ワカ), also of mixed British and Japanese descent. Official household registers preserved at Nagasaki City Hall indicate that Tomisaburō was the son of a woman named Kaga Maki (加賀 マキ). Kaga Maki married a Japanese man and died in Nagasaki in 1905.

Despite his Japanese citizenship, Kuraba Tomisaburō was hounded as a potential spy by the Japanese military police during World War II. His wife Waka died in 1943, and Tomisaburō committed suicide on 26 August 1945, soon after the atomic bombings of Hiroshima and Nagasaki and a few weeks before the arrival of American occupation forces in Nagasaki.

=== False correlation with Madama Butterfly ===
Thomas Glover has been erroneously linked with Giacomo Puccini's opera Madama Butterfly in tourist brochures, popular magazines, and some academic literature. The stories by John Luther Long and Pierre Loti that it is based upon (albeit with some debate on exactly which and to what extent) are set on the eastern slope of Nagasaki Harbour. There is no historical evidence to support this linkage, except Glover's adoption of half-British Tomisaburō, the photographs of Glover's wife Tsuru wearing a kimono with a butterfly design on the sleeve, and Loti's Summer 1885 affair a few blocks north of Glover Garden with Kiku (Chrysanthemum) née Kane. There are no naval officers, desertions, or attempted suicides in Glover's life as in the stories; rather, Tsuru's aforementioned death followed surgery. There is also no evidence for the claim that Tsuru went by the nickname "Chōchō-san" (Ms Butterfly).

These tourist brochures', magazines', and articles' source is ultimately the fact that the American occupation forces in Japan nicknamed the former Glover House at Glover Garden, which they had requisitioned after World War 2, the "Madame Butterfly House" (on the basis of the panoramic view over Nagasaki Harbor and the Euro-Japanese ambiance of the building). This nickname in its turn might have originated with the 1932 Cary Grant and Silvia Sidney American movie Madame Butterfly having been partly filmed on location at the Glover mansion, and there are earlier mentions of the mansion being "the original setting of Madame Butterfly" in the 1926-04-25 Japan Times in coverage of a cherry-blossom fête being held there. As this nickname was popular with American visitors, with even at the end of the 20th century the admission tickets for visitors to the house still bearing the title "Home of Madame Butterfly", the Japanese, albeit somewhat controversially at the time, picked up on this as a way to promote the postwar tourism industry.

The linkage was later, in the 1950s, introduced into academic literature by way of Duiti Miyazawa writing in Opera News and elsewhere in the 1950s. (Note: See Miyazawa 1953 and Miyazawa 1959 in further reading.) Miyazawa introduced the hypothesis, and then in fact proceeded to refute it with factual evidence, albeit then proceeding to argue that this truth is unimportant when it comes to the opera tale itself. An outraged letter to Opera News was written in response by Edith Correl Spindle, daughter of John Luther Long's sister Jennie Correll, who had both studied the opera at the New England Conservatory of Music and known the Glovers personally, which Opera News never printed. Miyazawa's contra-factual thesis, that was published, has since been repeated by people such as Roderick Cameron (Note: See Cameron 1962 in further reading.) and others.

== Freemasonry claim ==
There is speculation that he may have been a Freemason. However, no concrete evidence has been presented to support the claim. The gate with the Freemasons' insignia, which Gardiner and others cite as proof of some connection, was relocated to Glover Garden in the 1960s from the site of the former Masonic Lodge in Matsugae-machi, and none of the buildings in present-day Glover Garden have any historical link with Freemasons.

What trading houses like Jardine Matheson were looking for were boys of high ambition who showed strength of character useful in negotiation and who were willing to spend years away from their families. In Thomas Blake's case, the scouts may have been Masons: one of the buildings in the Glover Garden complex is a Masonic lodge, and there is a close system of business contacts running through his career. Jardine Matheson invited Thomas to interview sometime in early 1857 at the age of 18, and not long after he was posted to China. The reason for Jardine Matheson's appointing Thomas Blake Glover are not documented, even in their own records, and may have involved exotic handshakes. We don't know.

In Scottish Freemasonry, it is possible for the son of a Freemason to become one himself, at the age of eighteen, but there remains no evidence that Thomas Berry Glover was a member of the secret society.

== Residences ==
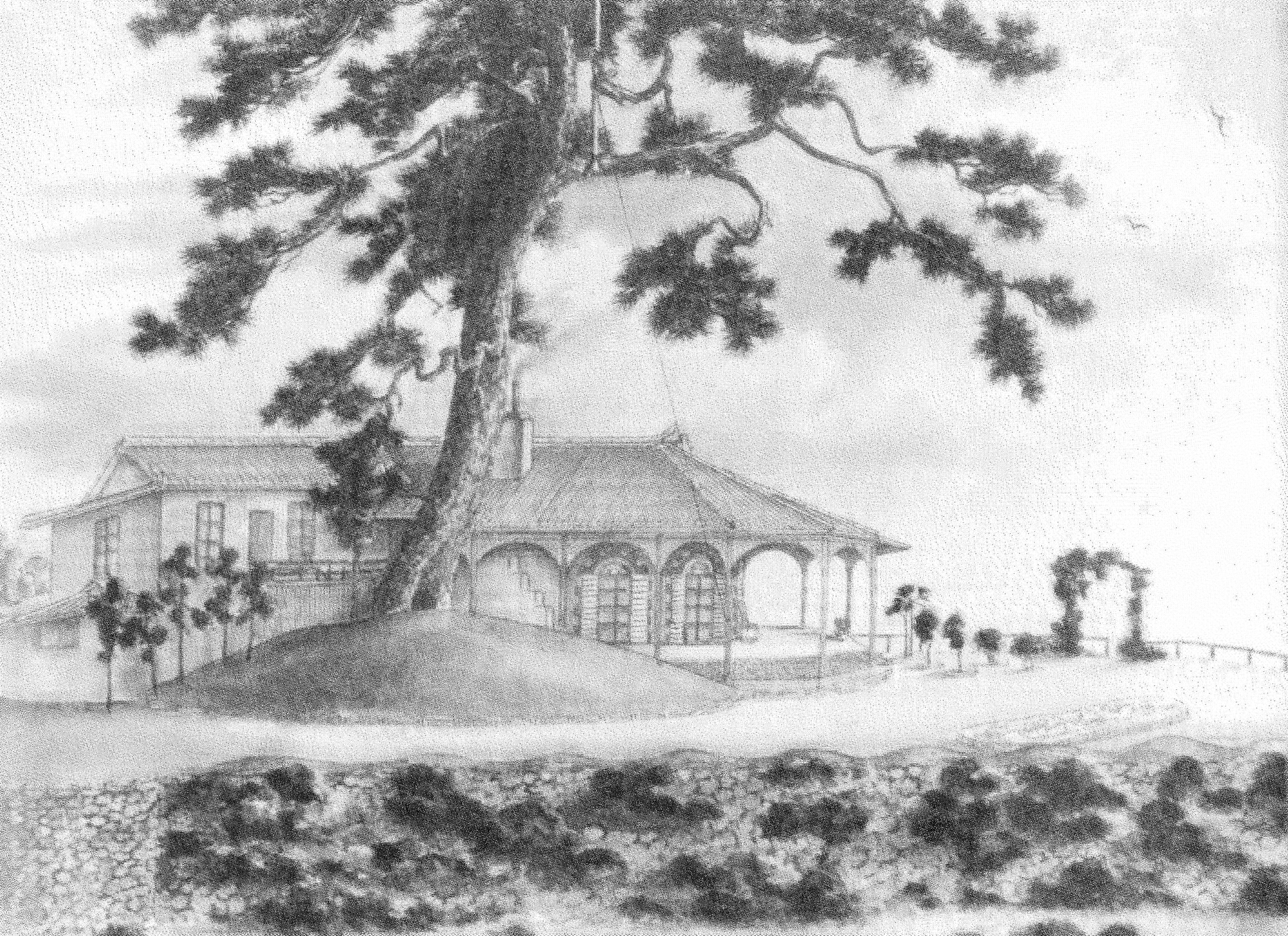
Glover House known as Ipponmatsu (Single Pine Tree) from a drawing of 1863. The tree was chopped down in the early 1900s.

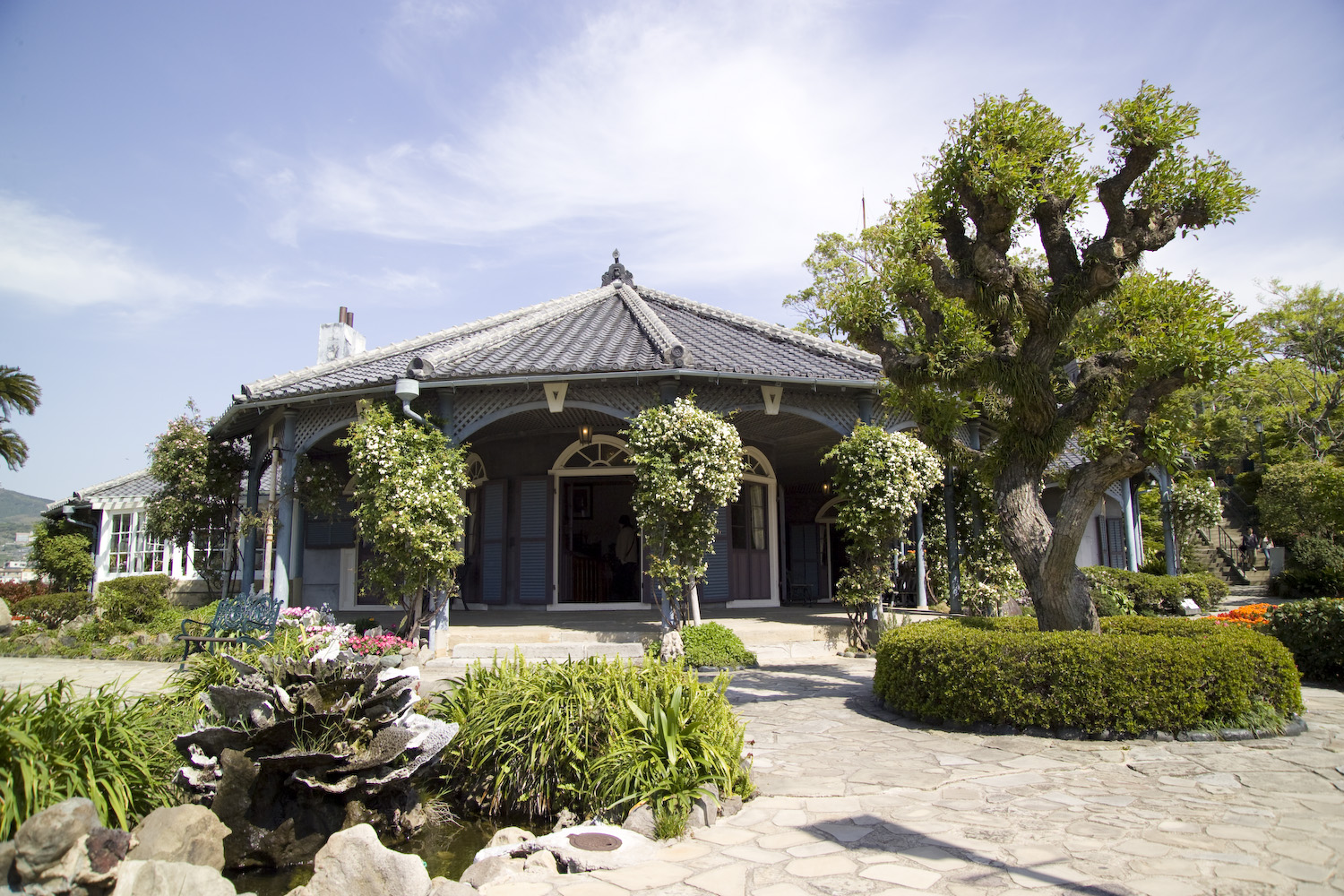
Today's Glover-Garden, Nagasaki

Glover's former residence in Nagasaki is now a visitor attraction known as Glover Garden and attracts two million visitors each year. He also had a residence in the Shiba Park area of Tokyo.

The site of the house where Glover is thought to have been born in Fraserburgh was levelled after a bomb strike during World War II, although a blue plaque marks the site of his birth. A display in Fraserburgh Heritage Centre commemorates this link.

Braehead House in Aberdeen (now known as Glover House) was purchased by the Glover family in 1864 and Thomas Blake's parents lived there until their deaths. The house was purchased by Mitsubishi in 1996 and gifted to Grampian Regional Council. Due to local government reorganisation, the house became the property of Aberdeen City Council the same year, and in 1997 it was sold to Grampian Japan Trust for £1. The Trust sold the house to Mitsubishi for £250,000 who immediately sold it back to them for £1. The Trust used the funds to convert part of the house to a museum about Thomas Blake Glover's life. It closed to visitors in 2012 and ownership of the empty house transferred to Glover House Trustees Ltd (a company wholly owned by Aberdeen City Council) in 2015. As of October 2021, no new use for the house had been found and the property had fallen into disrepair.

== Honours and legacy ==
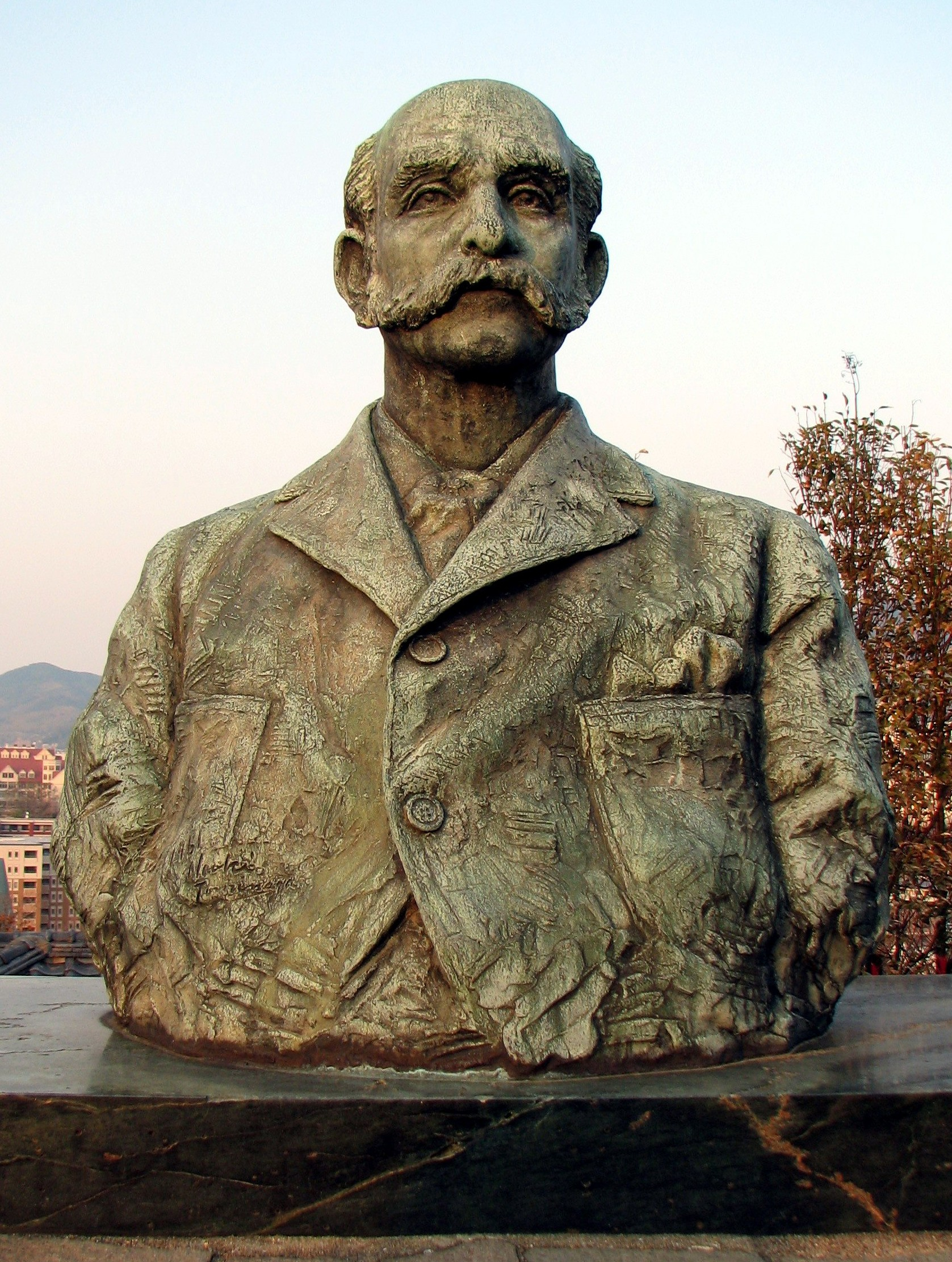
Statue of Thomas Blake Glover in Glover Garden, Nagasaki

- Order of the Rising Sun, Gold and Silver Star, 1908 (Japan).

His association with the rebellious samurai clans of Satsuma and Chōshū, and his interest in samurai generally seems to have contributed to his being referred to as the "Scottish Samurai" in Scotland. A Scottish Samurai award has been initiated by one of Aberdeenshire's most famous sons, who also holds the Order of the Rising Sun; Ronald Stewart Watt, OBE, ORS, OSS 大将軍, KCCR, KHT, 9th Dan, Hanshi, assisted by the Aberdeen Sports Council.

In December 2021, a plantation of cherry blossom trees in Mineralwell Park, Stonehaven was dedicated to Glover.

== The Glover whisky ==
The Glover series of whiskies was launched in October 2015 to celebrate the life of Thomas Blake Glover and honour the long-standing relationship between Scotland and Japan.

Initially, two whiskies were created, a 22-year-old and a 14-year-old. These were made using rare single malt whisky from the highly sought-after and now defunct Hanyu distillery in Japan and single malt Scotch from Longmorn and Glen Garioch distilleries, with the blending and bottling carried out by Fife-based Adelphi. They are considered to be the first Scottish-Japanese blend, and celebrate the fact they are a blend of Scotch and non-Scotch.

The Glover 22-year-old, which had the highest concentration of the Japanese whisky, was priced at £1,050. Only 390 bottles were made. The 14-year-old was priced at around £85 and 1,500 bottles were made. Both have subsequently sold out.

A third fusion whisky, an 18-year-old, was launched in August 2016. Of this, 1,448 were made, priced around £145.

== In fiction ==
Glover is the subject of The Pure Land by Alan Spence. The novel relives in fiction his true life rise and fall, and his love affair with a courtesan who, unknown to him, has a son for which he has longed. Glover is also the basis for the character Jamie McFay in the James Clavell novel Gai-Jin, set in the early 1860s. In addition, Glover appeared as an enemy in the Japanese videogame Ryū ga Gotoku Ishin! and is voiced by Jeff Gedert.

== See also ==
- Harry Smith Parkes
- Foreign cemeteries in Japan
- Anglo-Japanese relations
- Chōshū Five
- Richard Henry Brunton, another Scotsman who made a major impact in 19th century Japan
- Joseph Henry Longford was a friend of Glover
- Ernest Satow
- Alexander Cameron Sim
- Henry Dyer
- List of Westerners who visited Japan before 1868
