= Glover Garden =

Park in Nagasaki, Japan

Coordinates: 32°44′01″N 129°52′09″E

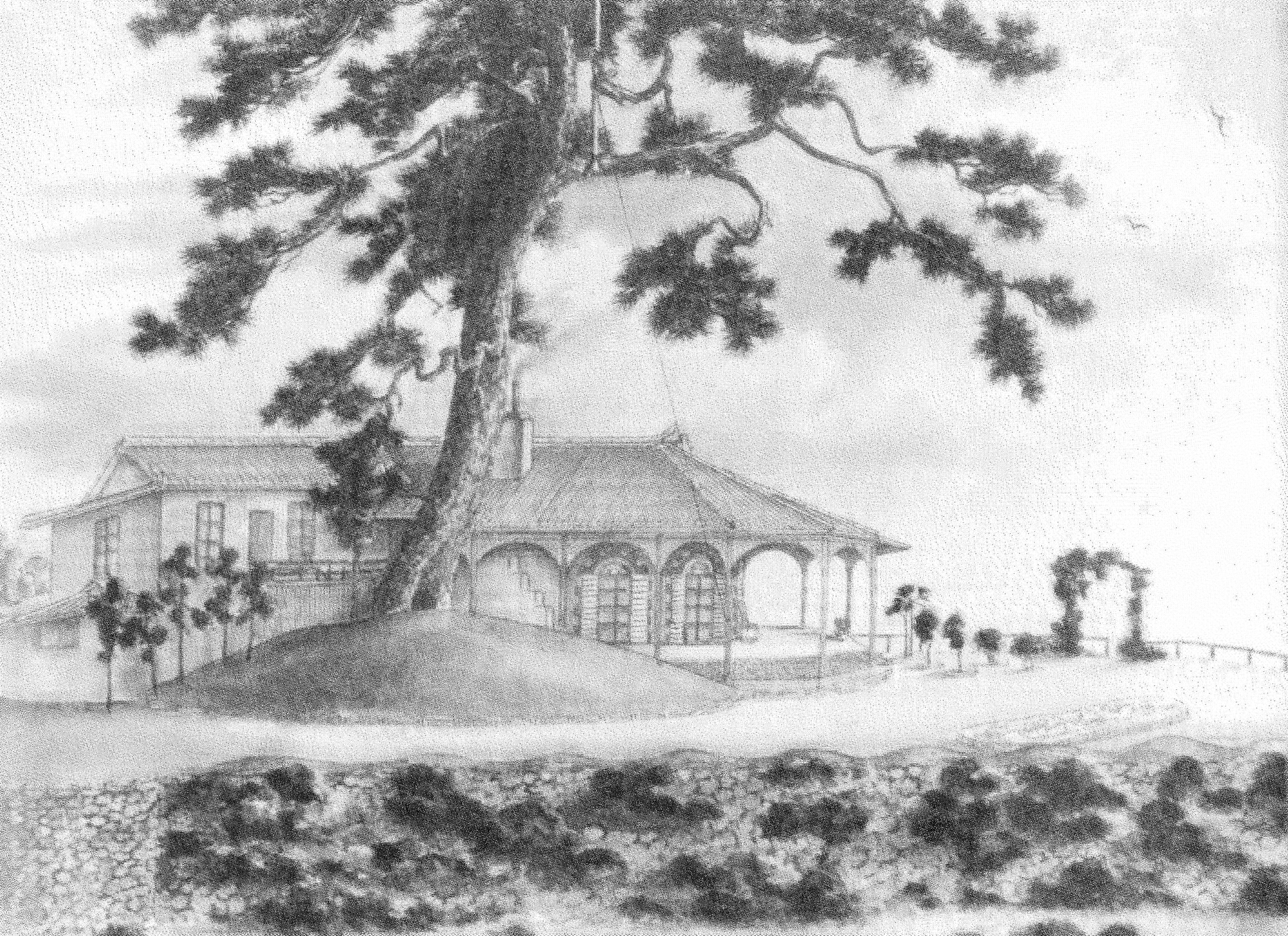
Glover House known as Ipponmatsu (Single Pine Tree) from a drawing of 1863. The tree was chopped down in the early 20th century.

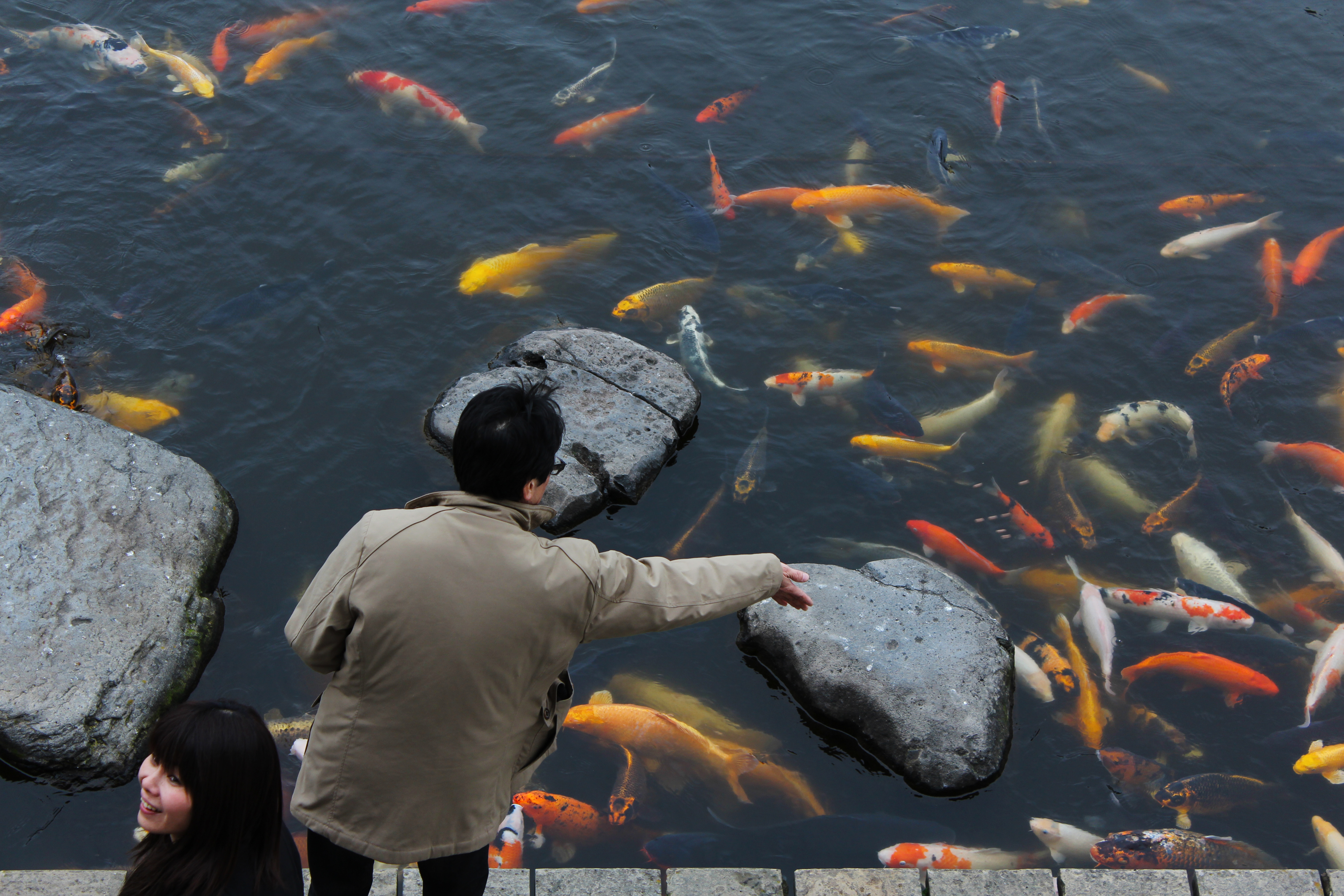
Koi pond in front of the Glover residence

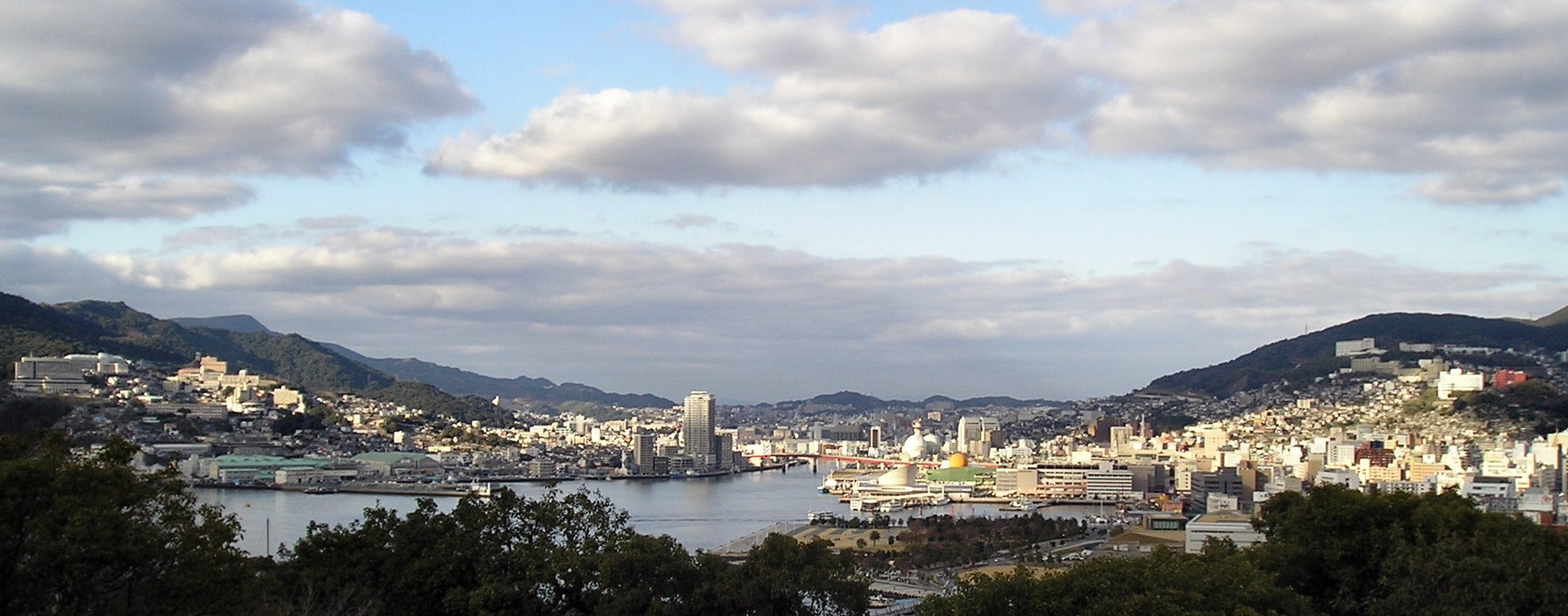
Overlooking Nagasaki harbor

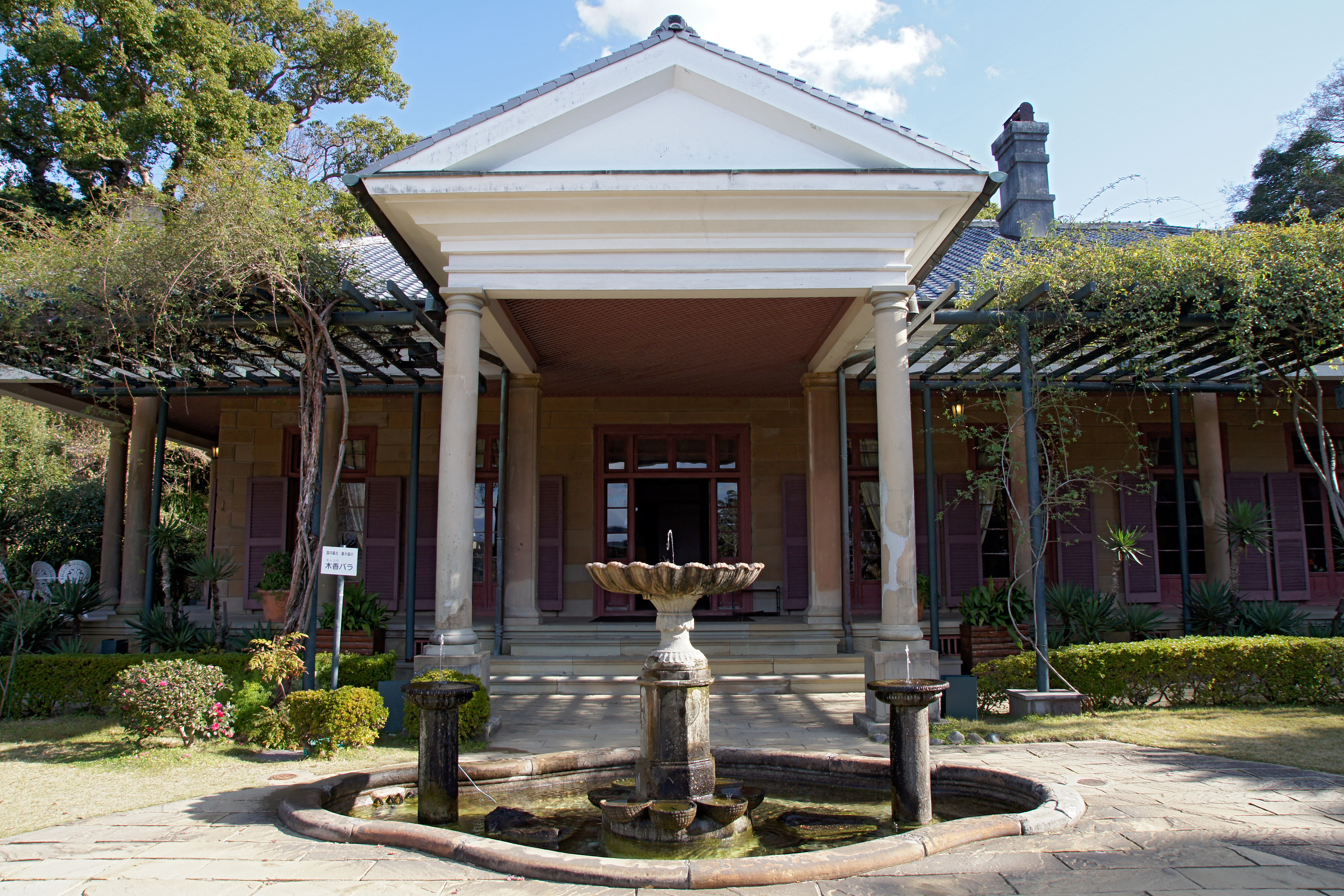
The garden

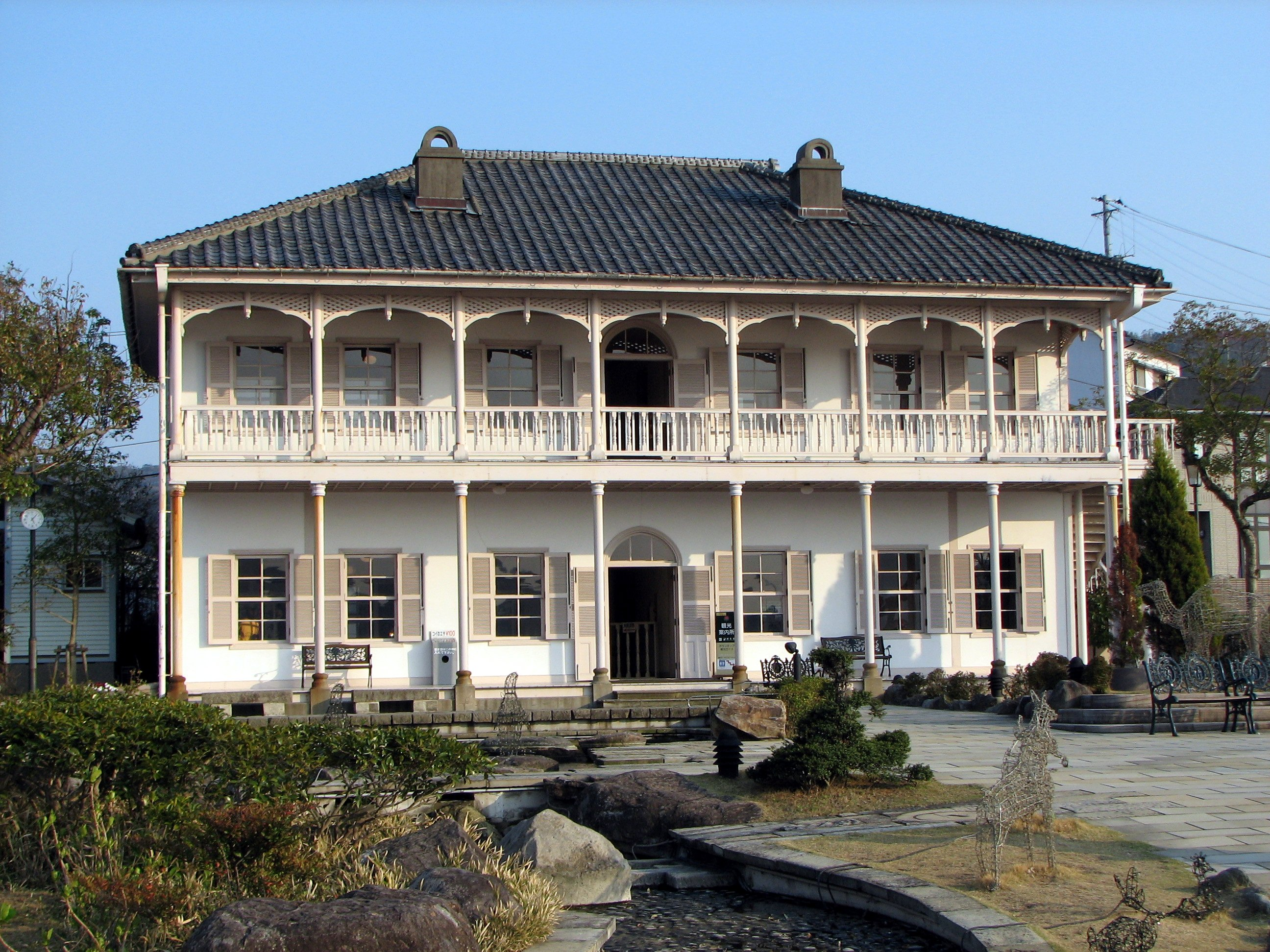
Former Mitsubishi second dock house in Glover Garden

Glover Garden (グラバー園, Gurabāen) is a park in Nagasaki, Japan, built for Thomas Blake Glover, a Scottish merchant who contributed to the modernization of Japan in shipbuilding, coal mining, and other fields. In it stands the Glover Residence, the oldest Western-style house surviving in Japan and Nagasaki's foremost tourist attraction.

It is located on the Minamiyamate hillside overlooking Nagasaki harbor. It was built by Hidenoshin Koyama of Amakusa island and completed in 1863. It has been designated as an Important Cultural Asset. As the house and its surroundings are reminiscent of Puccini's opera, it is also known as the "Madame Butterfly House." Statues of Puccini and diva Miura Tamaki, famed for her role as Cio-Cio-san, stand in the park near the house. This house was also the venue of Glover's meetings with rebel samurai, particularly from the Chōshū and Satsuma domains.

== Glover Residence ==
The Glover Residence is noted for its blend of Western and Japanese elements and is an example of treaty port building. This type of architecture closely resembles one-story bungalows used by foreigners in Hong Kong or Shanghai and imported to Japan by British traders. Rather than following contemporary Victorian styles, this type of building more closely reflects the Georgian aesthetic popular in Britain during the previous generation.

The stone-floored verandas, latticed arches, and French windows are several of the distinctive foreign elements included in the residence, while Japanese influence can be seen in the tile roof with its demon-headed tiles intended to ward off evil. The roof was modified by adding unmistakably British chimneys.

The house was built by a Japanese carpenter, Koyama Hidenoshin. The plan for the house, which is still preserved, is unsigned. The plan uses feet instead of Japanese measurements. The basic construction of the house is Japanese, despite its foreign elements. It consists of traditional Japanese roof supports and post-and-beam frames set down on boulders.

== Other buildings ==
The park also includes Ringer House (built 1865 for Frederick Ringer) and Alt House (built for William Alt). The correct treatment of the Tuscan pillars and pediment at the Alt House suggest that this building was designed by a Western architect. The pediment is often conspicuously incorporated into Masonic temples, and might have been employed here in the same manner as a Masonic symbol.

Furthermore, the stone gate of the Nagasaki Masonic Lodge is preserved in Glover Garden:

The Nagasaki Masonic Lodge was inaugurated at No. 50 Oura on October 5, 1885. The founding members were all British, but during the following years, men of various nationalities and religions became members and participated in regular meetings and social events. The lodge moved to a new building at No. 47 Oura in June 1887. The Freemasons contributed to the Nagasaki community until disbanding in the early Showa Period due to a lack of members. Today, the graves of several former Freemasons can be found in Nagasaki' s international cemeteries, and the stone gate of the former lodge is preserved in Glover Garden.

== Tourism ==
View over Nagasaki harbour from Glover Garden

The park is open to the public and attracts nearly two million visitors a year.
